= Sant'Anastasia, Verona =

Church in Veneto, Italy

Coordinates: 45°26′43″N 11°0′0″E

Basilica of Saint Anastasia
- Basilica di Santa Anastasia
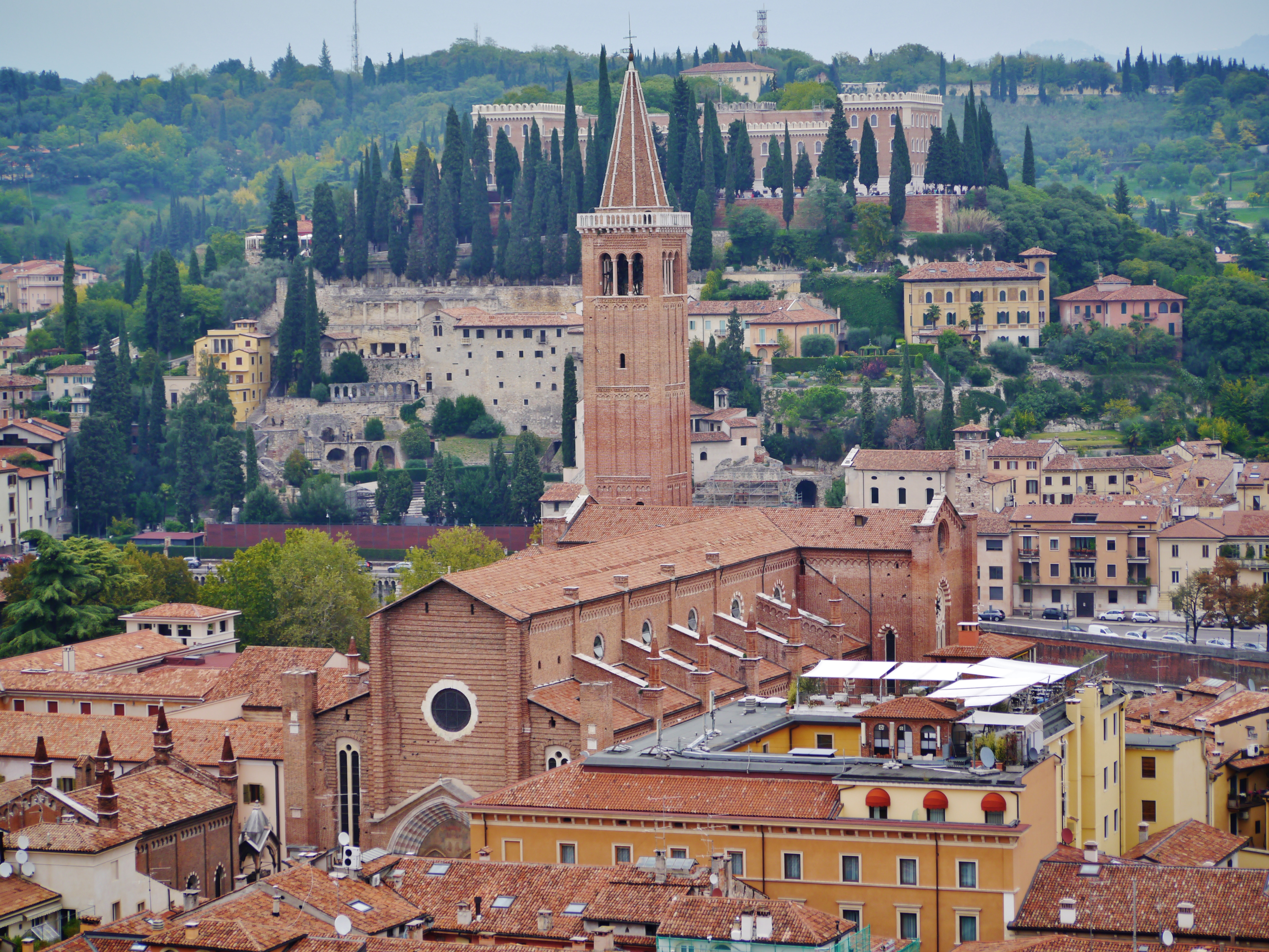
- View from the Torre dei Lamberti
- Basilica of Saint Anastasia
- Location: Verona, Veneto, Italy
- Denomination: Catholic
- Website: https://www.chieseverona.it/it/le-chiese/la-basilica-di-santa-anastasia

History
- Dedication: Peter of Verona
- Consecrated: 1471

Architecture
- Style: Gothic
- Groundbreaking: 1290
- Completed: Unfinished

Administration
- Diocese: Roman Catholic Diocese of Verona

The church of San Pietro da Verona in Santa Anastasia, better known as the basilica of Santa Anastasia, is an important Catholic place of worship that stands in the heart of the historic center of Verona; it is located at the end of the decumanus maximus of the city in Roman times, near the point where the wide meander of the Adige river is crossed by the Ponte Pietra, where the two main traffic routes of the city, road and river, gravitate. It is the largest, most solemn and representative church in Verona, a reflection of a lively moment in the city's life, when the expansion and consolidation of political and economic institutions allowed the community, in synergy with the Scaliger rule, the Dominican clergy and the Castelbarco family, to make a considerable financial effort to build this important temple, a symbol of their power.

The church represented the most important Gothic period for Verona. In the years immediately following its construction, it became a point of reference on which the designs of several other religious buildings were based, especially thanks to some innovations that St. Anastasia introduced into the plan, with the development of a wide transept and the articulation of the apsidal area into four chapels on either side of the presbytery, where the high altar is located, to the wall structure entirely in brick and to the new type of bell tower. The façade is unfinished, except for a majestic Gothic mullioned doorway that leads to a large interior divided into three naves by monumental cylindrical columns. On either side of the two naves are a series of chapels and numerous altars, the most famous of which is the Fregoso altar by Danese Cattaneo, praised by Giorgio Vasari. In addition, it is possible to admire paintings and frescoes by famous masters of Veronese painting and beyond, such as Pisanello, Altichiero, Liberale da Verona, Stefano da Zevio, Nicolò Giolfino, Giovan Francesco Caroto, Felice Brusasorzi, Francesco Morone, Michele da Verona and Lorenzo Veneziano.

The beginning of its construction dates back to 1260, when the Dominican friars, who lived outside the walls of the city, received from the Bishop of Verona, Manfredo Roberti, the land on which to build the new church and convent. The construction of the great building began in 1290 and it took a very long time: it can be said that it was finished only in the 1440s, although the basic structures were already finished in the third decade of the previous century. The basilica was consecrated on October 22, 1471 by Cardinal and Bishop of Verona Giovanni Michiel, but minor works continued for more than two centuries, never reaching the completion of the main elevation. When the Dominican Order was suppressed in 1807, the temple was entrusted to the secular clergy, while the adjacent convent, now abandoned, later became the site of the Istituto Maffei.

The basilica is the seat of a parish included in the vicariate of the center of Verona.

== Origins of the name ==
The Basilica of St. Anastasia takes its name from a pre-existing Arian church from the Gothic period, dedicated by Theodoric to Anastasia of Sirmium. The church was later incorporated into another church building, dedicated to St. Remigius, from the Frankish period.

The present basilica is named after the co-patron saint of Verona, St. Peter, a Dominican martyr who was killed on April 4, 1252, not far from Monza. The people of Verona have always called it by its former name, and so it is unanimously known even outside the city limits, because of the pre-existing church.

== History ==
=== Origins ===
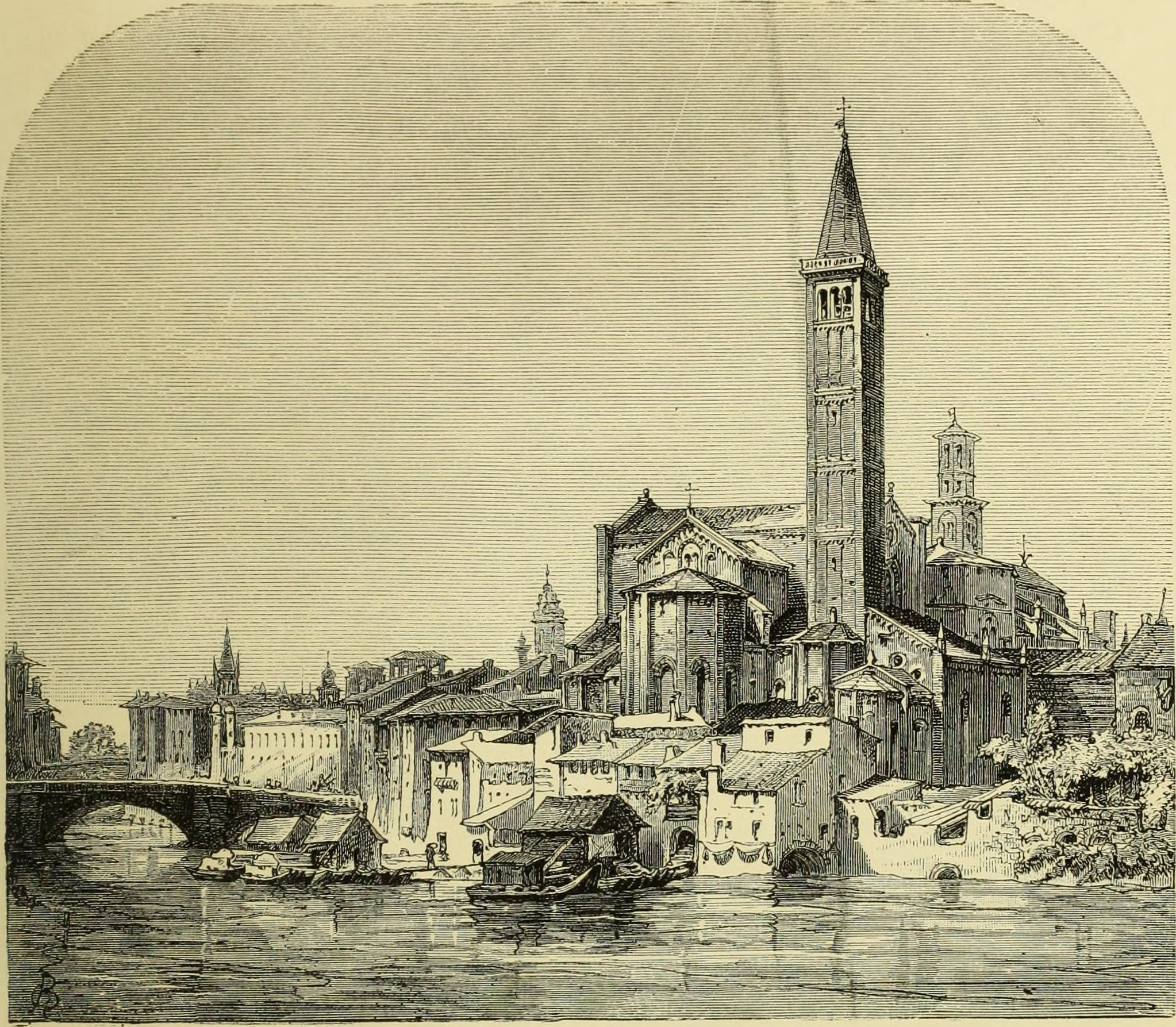
View from the north in a print from 1877

It is believed that on the site of the present religious building there were already two Christian churches in Lombard times, built, according to tradition, at the behest of the Ostrogothic king Theodoric: one dedicated to St. Remigius and the other to St. Anastasia, a martyr of the persecution of the Christians under Diocletian, whose cult had spread from Constantinople to Verona around the 8th century. The site chosen overlooked the ancient decumanus maximus of Roman Verona, the urban extension of the Via Postumia. The earliest news of this first construction is contained in a diploma dated October 2, 890, issued by the King of Italy Berengar I, in which reference is made "ad ecclesiam Sanctae Anastasiae" about the city of Verona. After this testimony, there is no further documentation for a long period of time, and a second mention is found only in a deed dated May 12, 1082, concerning a donation in favor of Anastasius, "archipresbyter, custos et rector" of the church of Santa Anastasia, of a courtyard, a wine press and vineyards in Illasi, near the church of Santa Giustina. (Note: "In finibus comitatus Veronensi, in loco et funde Ilasce, prope eclesia sanctae Iustinae". In Cipolla (1916, p. 2).) A subsequent decree of 1087 lists the many possessions the church had in the Verona area.

Sources show that the collegiate of religious who worked in the church in the 12th century was very numerous and important, so much so that there are several documents that mention the priests at their head: for example, a contract informs that a certain Bonseniore held the office of archpriest in March 1114, while a few decades later Pope Alexander III issued a decretal to Theobald and the clerics of Santa Anastasia in Verona. A testament dated June 27, 1226, in which a certain Ricerio, a miller, bequeathed ten soldi for works "ad porticalia Sancte Anastasie", suggests that the building was renovated at that time. These ancient sources do not reveal anything about the architecture of this early building, except that it had a choir, that there was a rectory on the outside, and that a portico had been built. Some historians believe that part of the wall of the Chapel of the Crucifix is a remnant of the ancient building, but this claim remains controversial.

=== Arrival of the Dominicans and start of construction ===
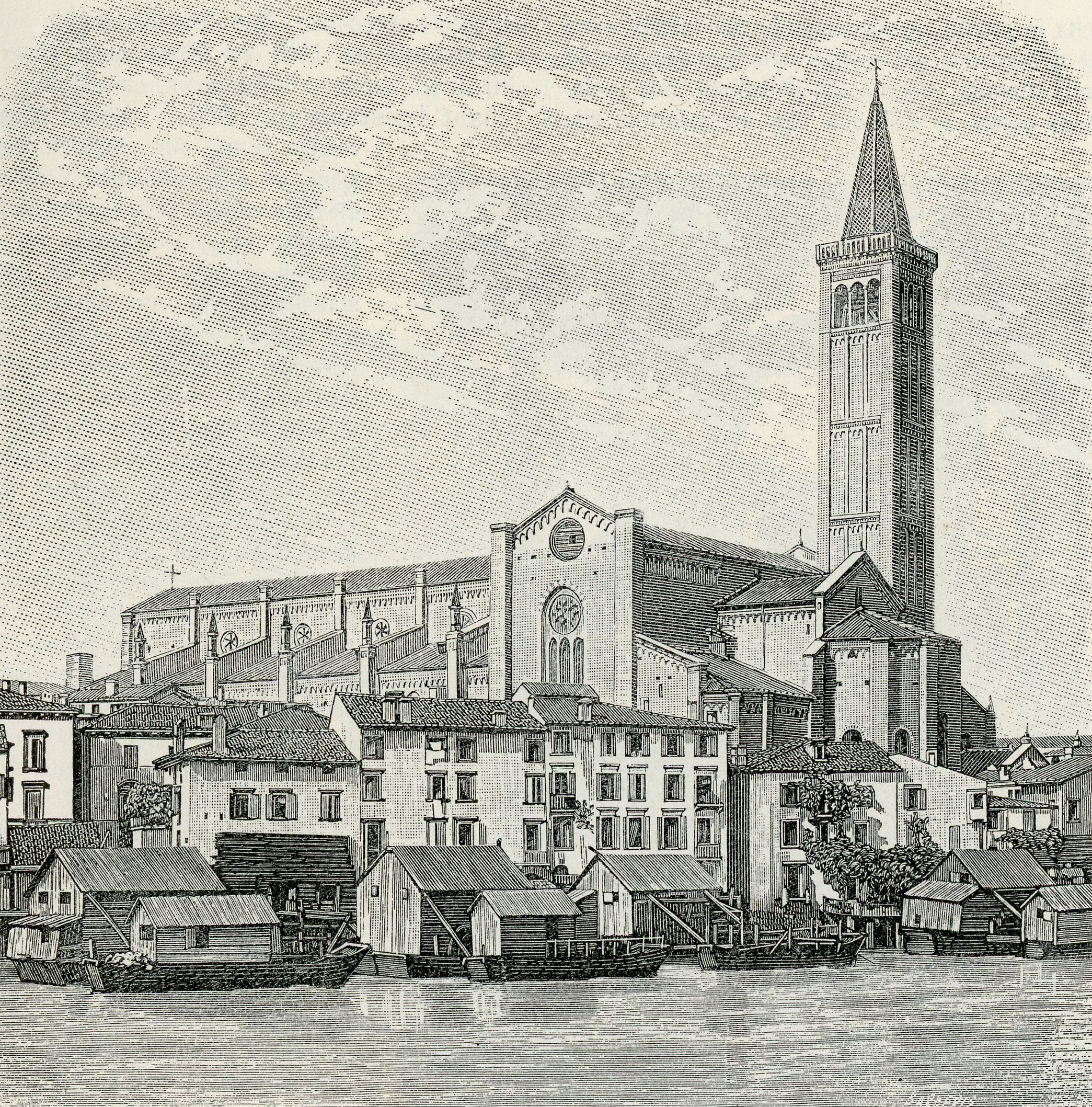
View from the east in a 1903 woodcut

The arrival of the Dominicans in Verona can be dated between 1220 and 1221, when they served in the church of Maria Mater Domini, a building demolished in 1517 that stood near the Rondella della Baccola, just outside Porta San Giorgio. The Veronese congregation, which enjoyed an excellent economic situation due to donations, had built a convent so large that in 1244 it hosted the General Chapter of the Order. Their importance was such that in 1260 the Bishop of Verona, Manfredo Roberti, decided that they should settle in the city to build their own convent and church, to be dedicated to their confrere Saint Peter of Verona, martyred in 1252 and canonized by Pope Innocent IV. For this purpose, one third of the one thousand five hundred Veronese lire obtained from the sale of Maria Mater Domini to the nuns of San Cassiano was used to buy the land around the ancient Santa Anastasia and to finance the first construction works.

Although a document dated March 20, 1280, which reads "in domo ecclesie sancte Anasasie" shows that the Dominicans were already involved in the new project, it took about thirty years after the abandonment of Maria Mater Domini before the actual construction began. It is probable, however, that even though the construction of the basilica had not yet begun, the construction of the monastery had begun in the meantime, and in the 80s it took on an essentially definitive character, modified only by some transformations that took place between the 14th century and the first half of the 15th century. The complex had four cloisters, the largest of which was called the "Cloister of the Dead" for its particular use, and several service rooms, including dormitories, the refectory, the studium with its library, and the main chapter.

Construction of the new and current basilica began in 1290, at a time when traditional Romanesque architecture was being abandoned in favor of Gothic, the style in which the building was designed, and the Dominicans received a land grant from Bishop Pietro I della Scala, dated April 2, 1292, to widen the entrance to the church and open up the view. (Note: The donation receipt indicated: "quam fratres dominicani aedificant in civitate Verone". In Castagnetti & Varanini (1991, p. 581).) In the first years, work on the building continued apace, supported by numerous donations and legacies, especially from members of the Della Scala family, such as Alberto I, who left a thousand Veronese lire, Cangrande II and Cansignorio. To commemorate these donations, the coat of arms of the Della Scala family was painted on both sides of the ogival triumphal arch that leads to the apse where the high altar is located.

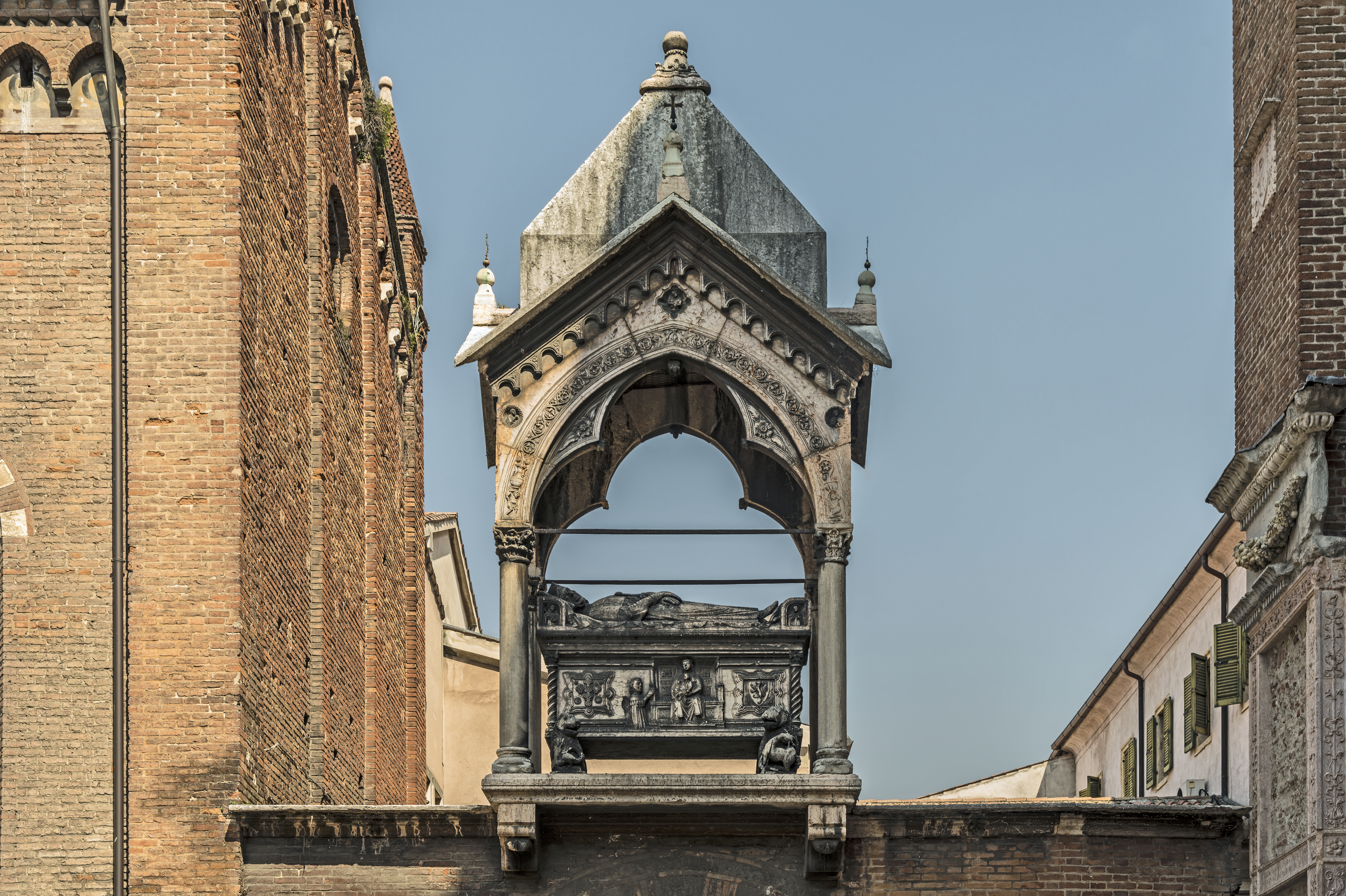
Ark of Guglielmo da Castelbarco, an important patron of the building

Many consider Guglielmo da Castelbarco, (Note: It is believed that Guglielmo da Castelbarco contributed to the construction of other churches in Verona, such as San Fermo and Santa Eufemia. In Cappelletti (1970, p. 10).) a friend of Cangrande I, to have been an ardent supporter of the construction, so much so that in his will, dictated in Lizzana on August 13, 1319, he ordered that his remains be buried in the church and that a thousand Veronese lire be spent on its construction. To the left of the present church, above the portico that once led into the monastery, there is still his sarcophagus, probably the work of the stonecutter Rigino di Enrico. An analysis of the building's materials suggests that at the time of Castelbarco's death in 1320, the apses, the high altar, the transept, the perimeter walls at least to half their final height, and the lower part of the façade had been completed.

Nothing precise is known about the identity of the architect who designed the building. Some scholars have proposed Castelbarco himself as the one who conceived the building's structure, but more careful and comparative studies with other buildings have revealed parallels with the church of San Lorenzo in Vicenza and the church of San Nicolò in Treviso, which have suggested the same author. Leaving aside the one that identifies him precisely as Guglielmo da Castelbarco, there are several hypotheses about the name of the architect: the most accepted, also supported by Carlo Cipolla, is the one that attributes the project to two Dominican monks, friar Benvenuto da Bologna and friar Nicola da Imola, authors of other buildings that have many elements in common with the plan of Santa Anastasia, but no documents have been found on the subject.

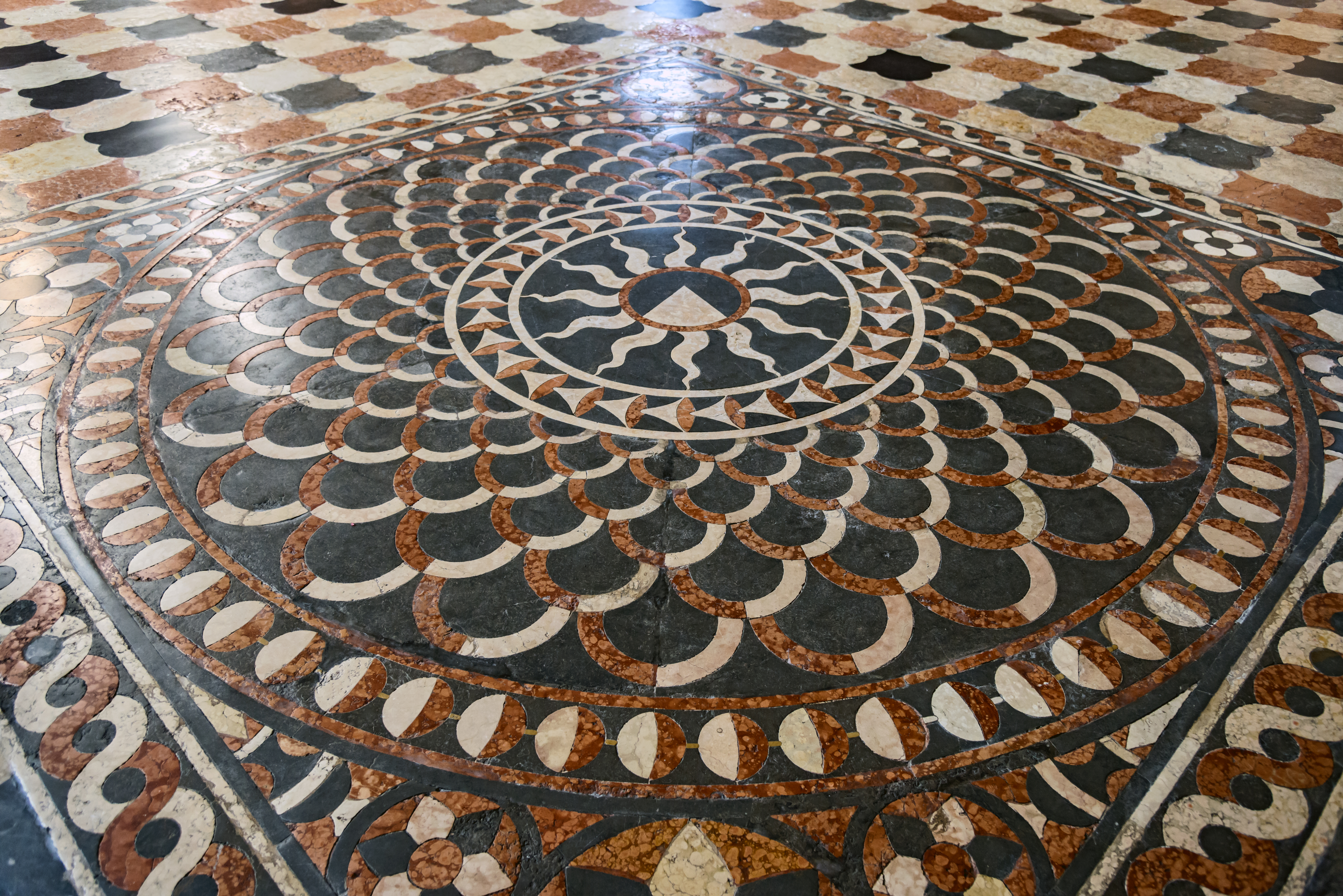
Detail of the floor, begun in 1462 to a design by Pietro da Porlezza, with the coat of arms of the Dominican Order in the center.

In the second half of the fourteenth century, the decline of the Scaliger rule had a negative impact on the construction work, which slowed down considerably, although it was partially alleviated by the continuous donations from private individuals, which made it possible to complete the works by the end of the century. Once political peace returned to Verona thanks to the devotion to Venice, the work was able to proceed more quickly: the construction site benefited from a papal bull that granted indulgences to anyone who contributed to the maintenance of the building, and the Podestà and the Captain of the People obtained from the Venetian Senate a reduction in the taxes related to the construction. Documents show that in 1428 the work on the roof of the church was well underway, although it was still partially uncovered, and the construction of the façade, which was to be made of stone, was being considered. On August 12 of the following year, a new papal bull ordered that the congregation of Conventual Dominicans at Santa Anastasia be replaced by Reformed ones. In 1462, Pietro da Porlezza, cousin of the architect Michele Sanmicheli, began to oversee the paving of the floor.

=== From the consecration to the present day ===
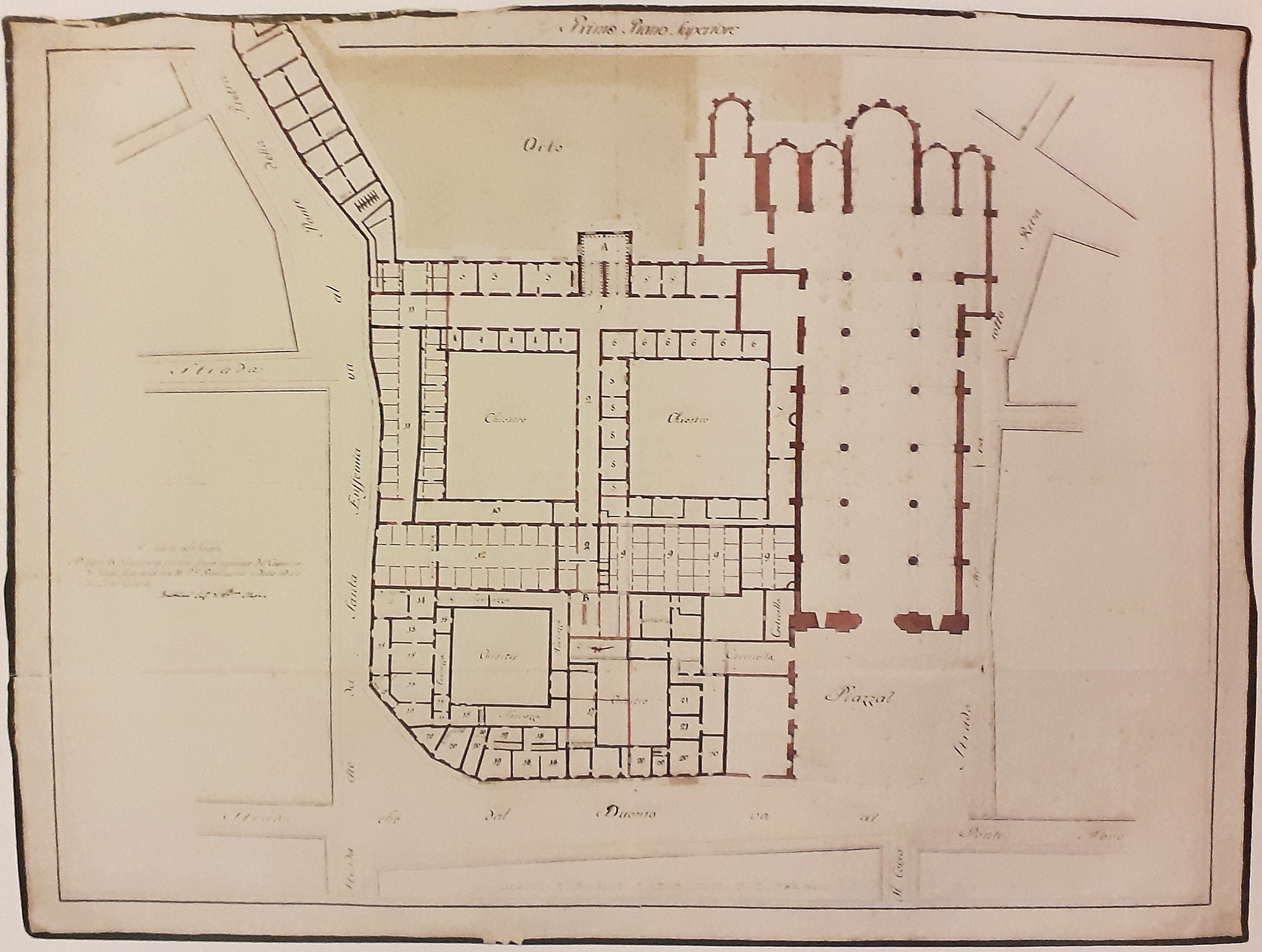
1807 plan of the monastery of St. Anastasia, with the four cloisters still perfectly preserved

The basilica was solemnly consecrated on October 22, 1471, by Cardinal and Bishop of Verona Giovanni Michiel, although the building site remained open for more than two centuries, during which time the side chapels were added, but the façade was never completed. Between 1491 and 1493, Master Lorenzo da Santa Cecilia made the chairs for the new choir; in 1498, the stained glass windows of the central rose window and the side windows of the façade were installed. Between 1509 and 1517, as a result of the upheavals following the War of the League of Cambrai, Verona came under the control of the Holy Roman Empire, and it was in Santa Anastasia that the ceremony of submission to Emperor Maximilian I was held. When the city returned to the rule of the Serenissima, in 1522 the frames of the panels decorating the pilasters of the main door were laid, in 1533 the square in front of it was paved, and at Easter 1591 a telamon by Paolo Orefice was placed to support the stoup.

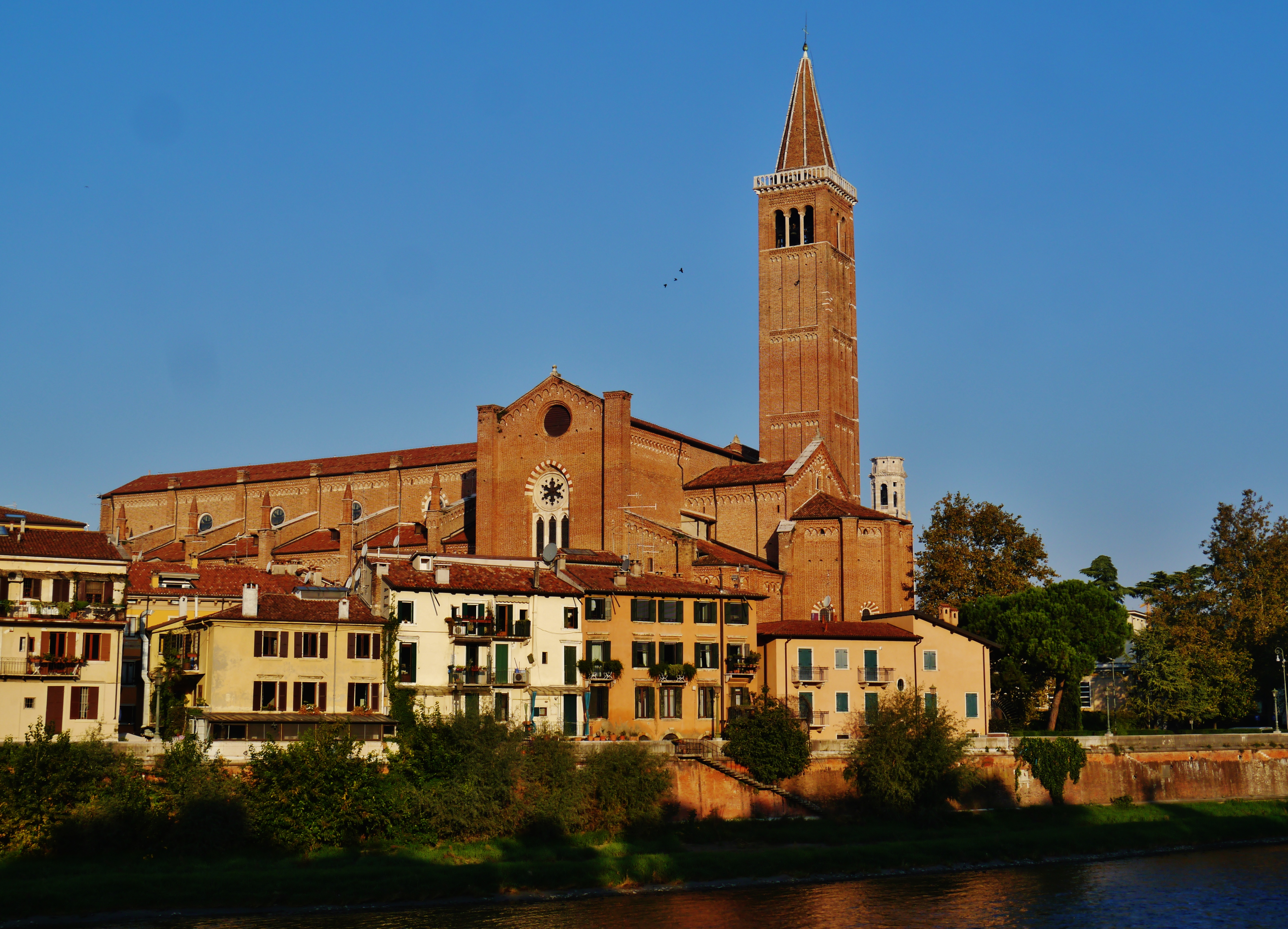
Current appearance of St. Anastasia

A plaque in the adjacent convent commemorates the visit of Pope Pius VI, who, returning from Vienna where he had met Emperor Joseph II, stayed in Verona from the evening of May 11, 1782 until the morning of May 13. Since the Bishop of Verona, Giovanni Morosini, was absent that day, the Pope stayed in the Dominican convent and, before leaving for Rome, celebrated Mass in Santa Anastasia.

On March 19, 1807, at the behest of Napoleon, the Dominican Order was suppressed, thus ending its presence in St. Anastasia, where it had served for almost five centuries. It was then entrusted to the diocesan clergy and became a parish with the benefice of Santa Maria in Chiavica. A similar fate befell the adjacent convent, which, after its final closure, became the seat of the Istituto Maffei. Between 1878 and 1881, the building underwent an intensive restoration, during which the bell tower was consolidated, some of the marble of the main door was replaced and the altars of the chapels were repaired. Some of the paintings were also restored, although the results were not always satisfactory. In 1967 a new restoration intervention, which lasted throughout the 1970s, led to much more satisfactory results, while in 1981 the restoration concerned the frescoes of the Lavagnoli Chapel. In 2010 a new extensive restoration was completed, involving the entire basilica, and is considered one of the most important interventions ever carried out on a Veronese monument.

== Description ==
=== Exterior ===
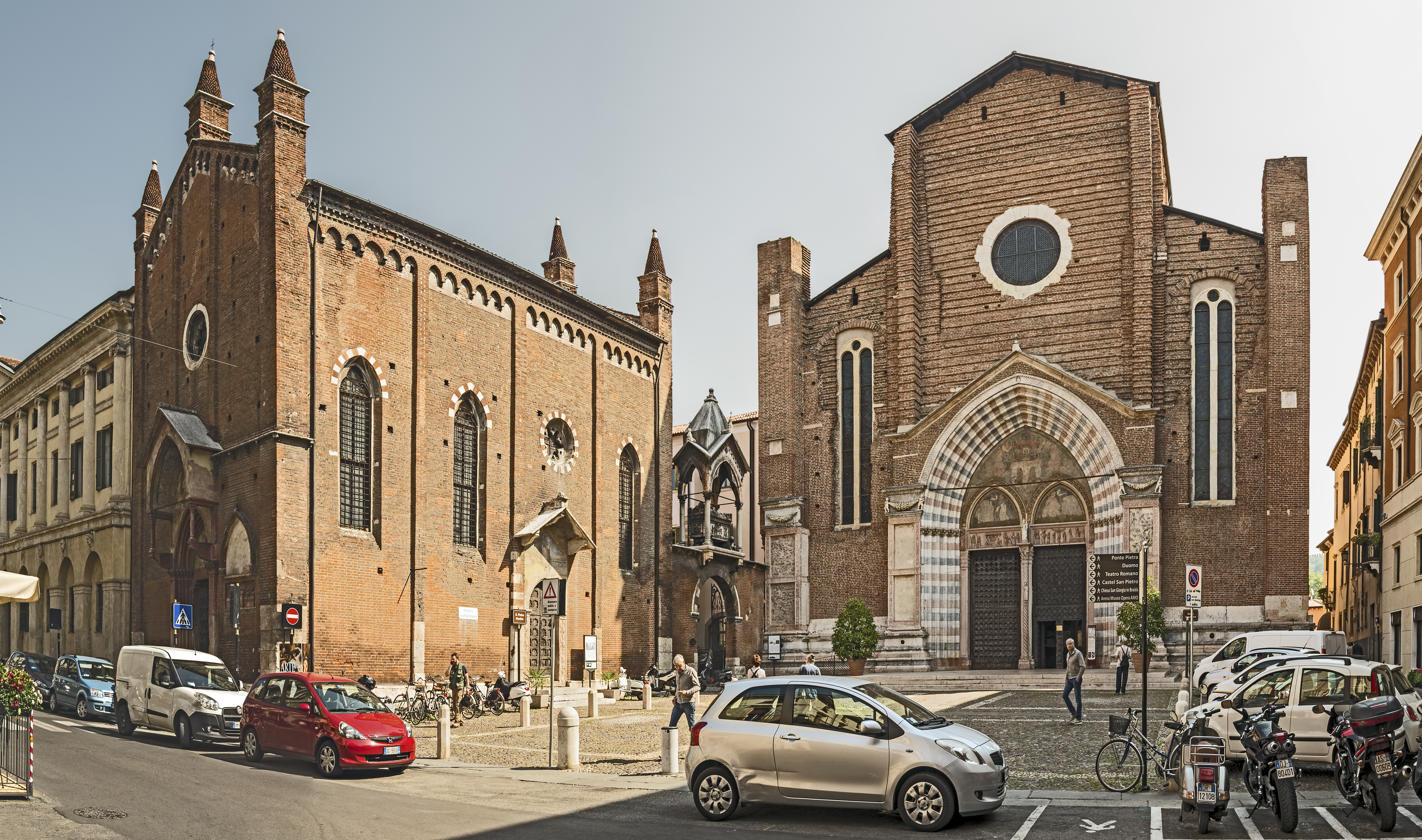
View of Piazza Santa Anastasia, overlooked by the Ark of Castelbarco and the Church of San Pietro Martire.

The exterior of the temple represents a fine example of Veronese Gothic architecture with Renaissance elements. The unfinished façade is characterized by various elements, among which a wide portal framed by a pointed marble arch, a central rose window and two biforas at the level of the aisles. On the extreme sides there are two buttresses that rise above the eaves line and are repeated on both sides up to the transept, where they are surmounted by hexagonal pinnacles whose function is to relieve the thrust of the vaults.

The lateral elevations are divided in height into two architectural registers, corresponding to the wall of the aisle (the lower register) and the protruding part of the nave (the upper register): the lower sector, in addition to the buttress with pinnacle just described, is characterized by the protruding volumes of the chapels and high mullioned windows, partly closed. The upper sector has a series of oculi that allow light to enter the nave. On the façade of the right transept, there is a high trifora and, higher up, a large polylobate Gothic rose window. In the apsidal structures, also characterized by imposing buttresses, there are ogival windows.

The eaves are decorated with Lombard ogival bands, from which the roofing of the building starts: the one that covers the nave, the transept and the choir is gabled, while the one that covers the aisles is single-pitched; the central apse is covered with a five-pitch hip roof.

On the left, looking at the façade, there is the sepulchral ark where Guglielmo da Castelbarco lies, placed above an archway leading to an inner courtyard (of the present Music Conservatory). This is the earliest example of a monumental ark, known as a "canopy ark", which would inspire and be followed a few years later by the Scaliger Tombs, where the Della Scala family, princes of Verona in the 14th and 15th centuries, are buried. Behind the ark, there are three other early medieval arks of fine workmanship. Also on the left, next to Piazza Santa Anastasia, is the church of San Pietro Martire, used by the Dominicans during the construction of Santa Anastasia and now deconsecrated.

==== Facade ====
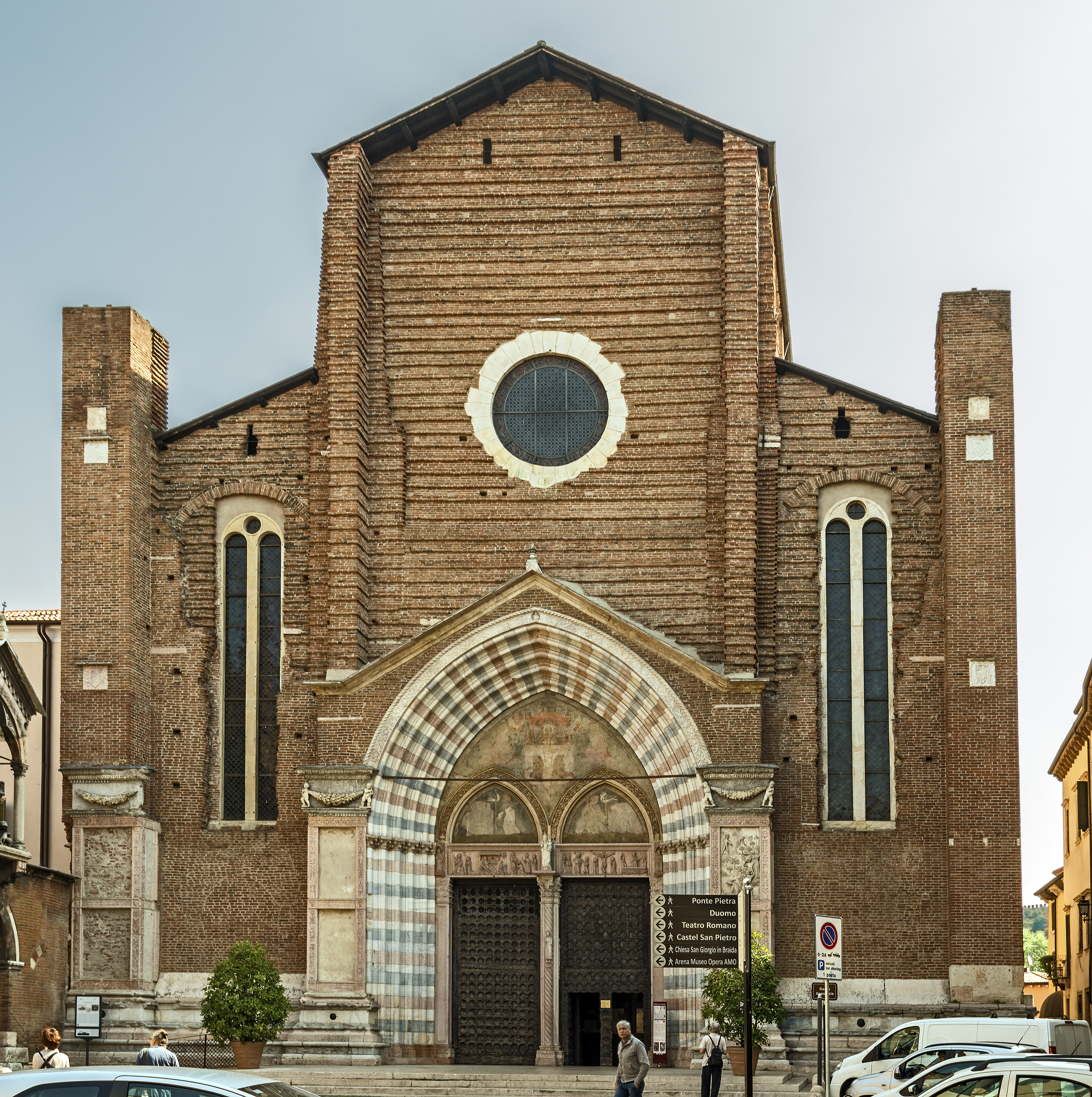
The unfinished facade

The Dominican church is similar in structure to the Venetian Basilica of Saints John and Paul, which belongs to the same order and was built almost at the same time. The tiered façade, unfinished (Note: Over the years, there were several attempts to complete the façade. On March 2, 1428, the Council of Twelve decided to complete it ("in pulcriori, decentiori ac meliori modo et opere, et presertim de lapide vivo et figuris"), and on March 6 of the following year they entrusted the work to the engineer Giovanni Matolino. Difficulties in raising the necessary funds did not allow the project to be completed. In Marini & Campanella (2011, pp. 25–28).) and mostly in brick, is divided into three bands corresponding to the interior naves. The central band is characterized at the top by a simple rose window, also unfinished, with an outer circular section and an inner part divided into six sections by means of two vertical supports.

The mullioned portal dates back to the first half of the 15th century and belongs stylistically to the early Renaissance architecture, with strong Gothic elements. The lower part is occupied by the portal divided into two sections, surmounted by two ogival arches, the whole framed by the Gothic portal, spread by a series of five overlapping pointed arches. The arches are supported by five tall, light ornamental columns in red, white and black marble, the same colors found in the interior floor.

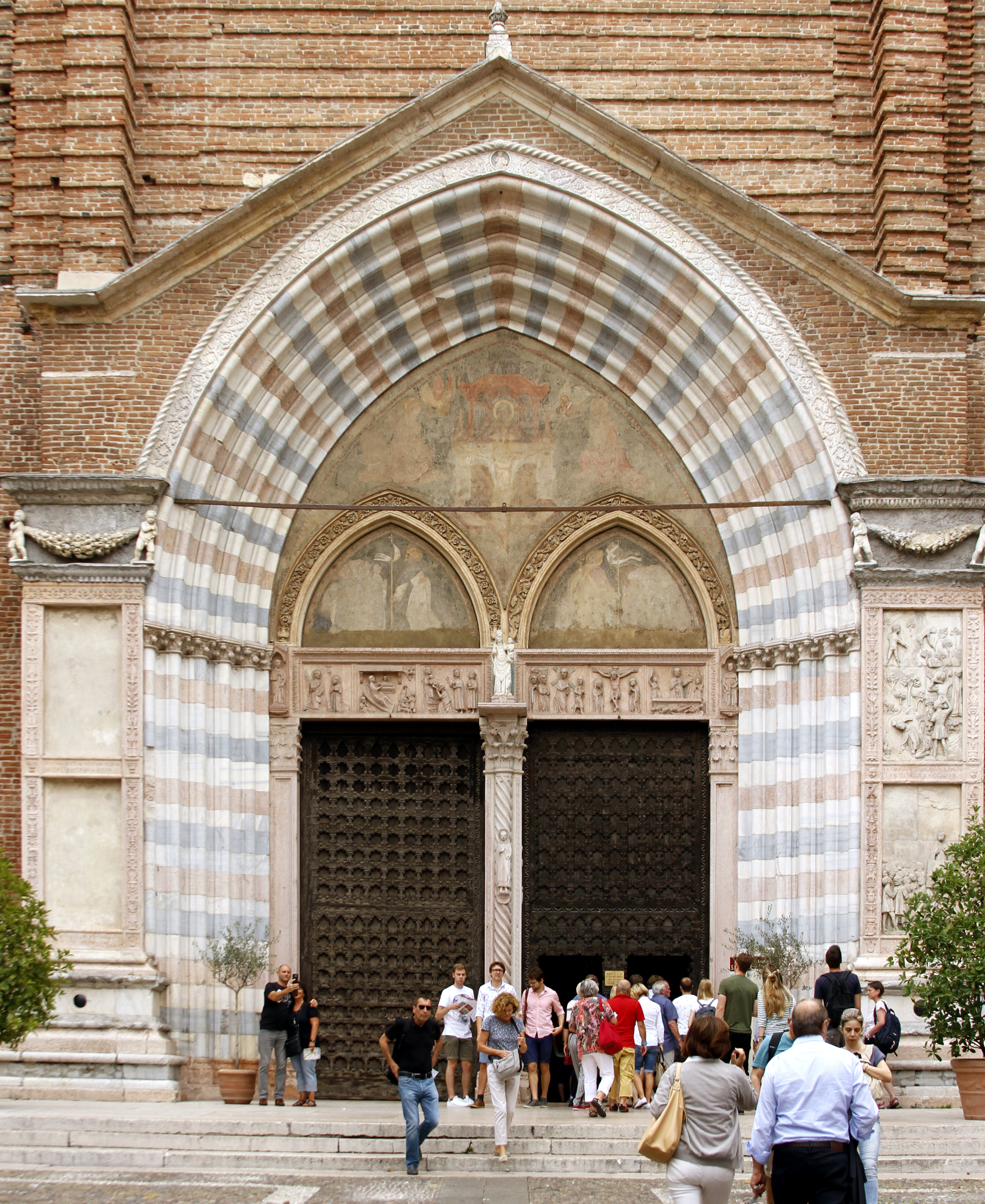
The Gothic portal with the frescoed lunettes

The main lunette has a representation of the Holy Trinity with the figures of St. Joseph and the Virgin Mary on either side. The Father is seated on a Gothic style throne with the crucifix between his knees and Christ at his side with a dove on his head. The figure is completed by a pair of angels above the Trinity. In the two smaller lunettes, the Bishop leads the people of Verona with the city's banner, and in the other, St. Peter the Martyr leads the friars with the black and white banner of the Dominicans. These frescoes seem to be largely lost today, despite a not very successful retouching during the restoration of 1881; the art historian Adolfo Venturi has recognized in these paintings the influence of the school of Stefano da Zevio, attributing them to some of his pupils.

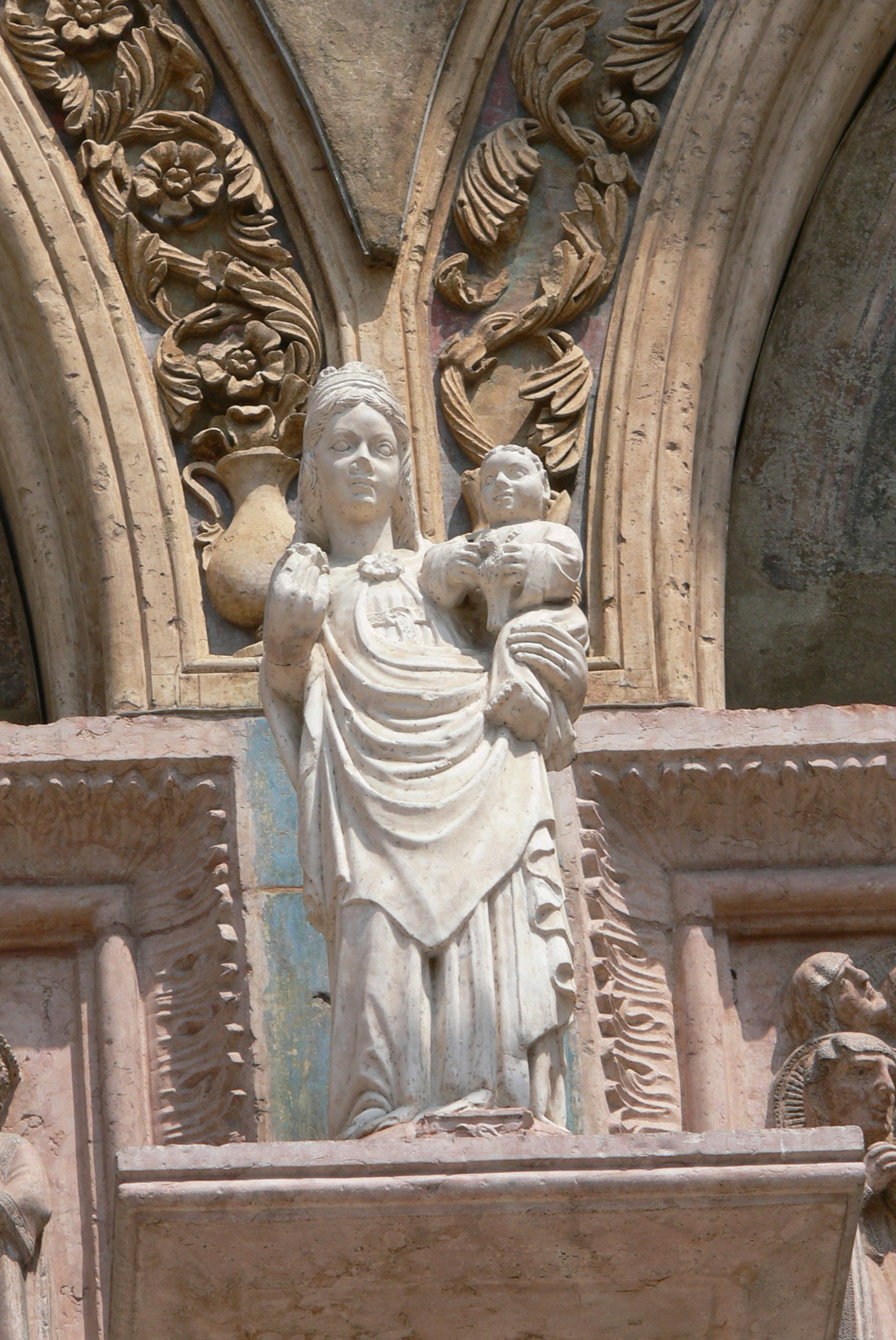
Statue of the Virgin and Child, placed above the central column of the portal

The smaller arches rest on the architrave of the portal, which is decorated in bas-relief with six representations in chronological order of the life of Christ: the Annunciation, the Nativity, the Adoration of the Magi, the Way to Calvary, the Crucifixion and the Resurrection. On either side of the architrave are two statues, the left one of St. Anastasia and the right one of St. Catherine of the Wheel. In the center of the architrave, above the elegant column that divides the two doors and rests on a shelf, there is a statue, larger than those on either side, depicting the Virgin and Child of the Venetian school. The dividing column has three high reliefs on the front and two sides. Opposite is St. Dominic, with the star under his feet; on the left, St. Peter the Martyr, preaching to the crowd, with the sun below; and on the right, St. Thomas, towering above the moon, holding the Book of the Doctors of the Church, while instructing a young monk.

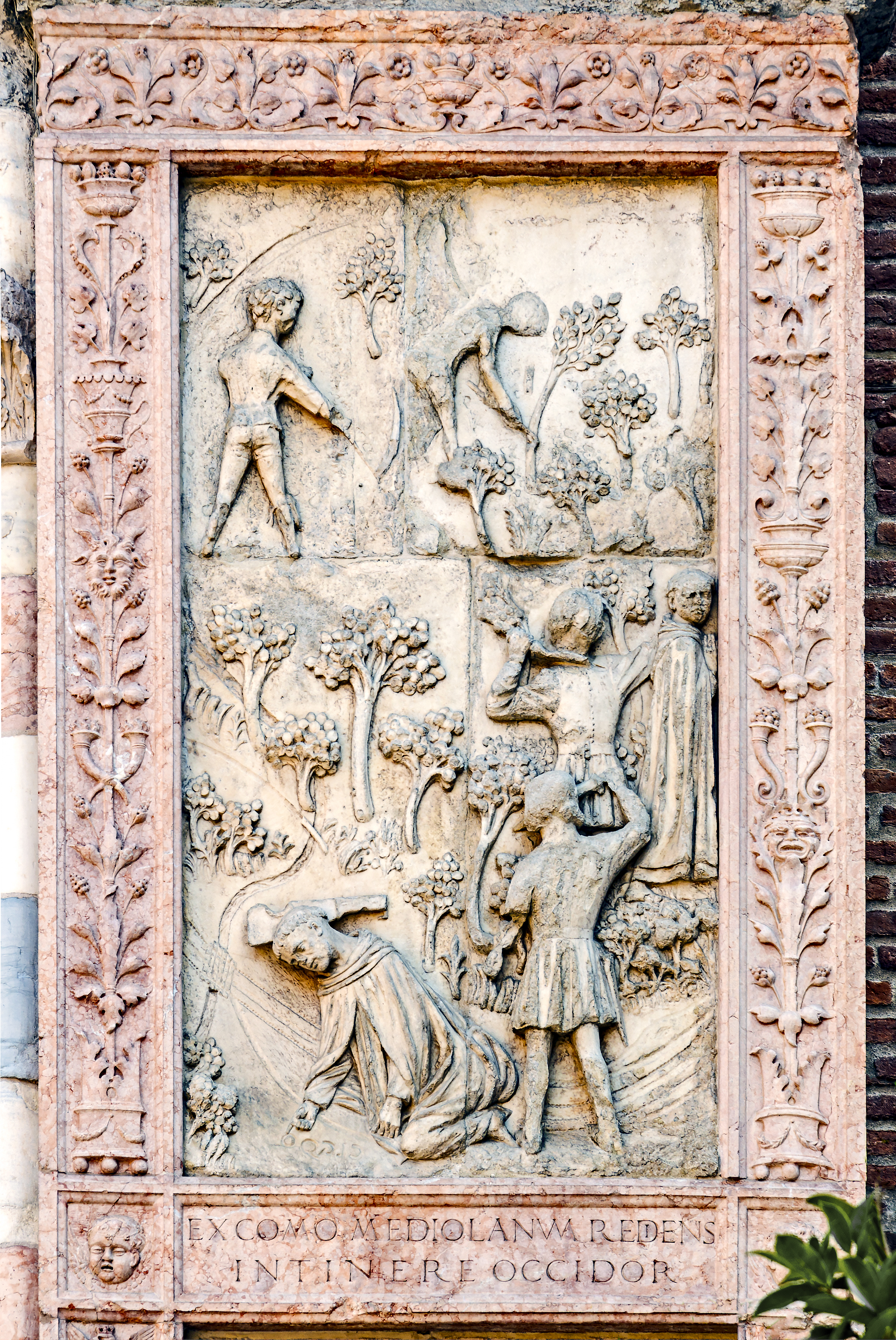
Panel with the martyrdom of St. Peter.

It has been suggested that the entire portal, like the floor, could have been made by Pietro da Porlezza in 1462. In support of this, Alessandro Da Lisca has observed that the marble work is so intimately connected to the interior that it forms a single work, like the terracotta protruding section, which in turn is inextricably linked to the wall of the church itself. Therefore, the wall, the protruding section and the marble portal would all be works of the 15th century.

Contrary to what must have been the original plan, only two marble panels were placed on the façade, more precisely on the pilaster to the right of the portal, where they represent, in the first, the preaching of St. Peter the Martyr and, in the second, his martyrdom. Of the four pillars, only the first three, from the left, have two inscriptions on each of them. (Note: From the top of the last pillar left of the viewer, the following inscriptions appear: 1. "E TECTO . CADENS . CRVRA . FREGIT . SEX || ANNOS . IACET . DATO . VOTO . MOX . AMBVLAT"; 2. "QUIBVS . PERIMOR . VLCERIBUS . ORANS || AD SEPVLCRVM . ATATIM . LIBEROR"; 3. "VIVENS . SECTVM . GLVTINO . PEDEM || IACENS . NAVFRAGIA . VETO"; 4. "PLVTO . IN . MARIAM . FORMATVS || VIAICO . VISO . STATIM . ABIT"; 5. "EX . COMO . MEDIOLANVM . REDIENS || ITINERE . OCCIDOR"; 6. "SYRIO . ARDENTE . DVM . PREDICO || AER . IN . NVBES . ME ORANTE . COIT") The first, fourth and sixth inscriptions refer to the miracles performed by the Saint, while the fifth refers to his martyrdom, so that the panels actually made correspond to the fifth and sixth inscriptions. These panels with their frames, which can be dated to the 15th century or the beginning of the next, were supposed to form a large framework that would have kept the existing portal intact.

Finally, on either side of the central gable, there are two rows characterized by the long stained glass mullioned windows that run through the entire wall partition, closed outwardly by two buttresses.

==== Bell tower ====
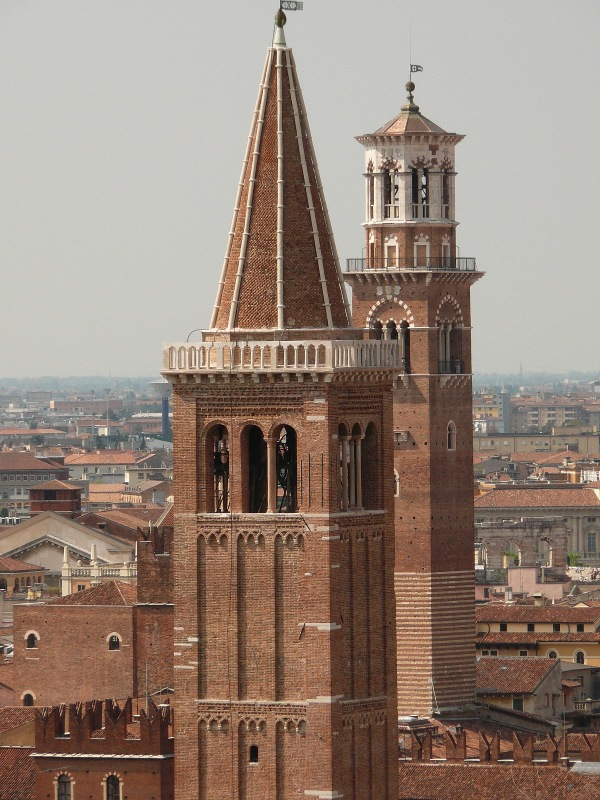
Detail of the belfry and the roof of the bell tower.

Near the left arm of the transept, at the top of the first apsidal chapel on the left, rises the imposing bell tower, of which little is known about its history. Seventy-two meters high and divided into six orders by white stone string courses, the Gothic tower has a pilastered shaft with recurring Lombard band decorations. The shaft of the bell tower ends in a belfry with four splayed triforas, one on each side, divided by columns with shaft, pedestal and capital of Tuscan order, and a balustrade of small white stone columns of elegant workmanship. From here, in turn, rises a conical spire in terracotta, intersected by slender white stone ogives. The style of the construction dates it to the 15th century, but it is possible that it was begun even earlier, at the same time as the apse. There is a document, now lost, dated January 15, 1433, by the notary Antonio of Cavagion (today Cavaion Veronese), according to which the Dominican monks sold a house for 50 ducats and used the proceeds "for the construction of the bell tower". On three small stones set in the sides of the bell tower, the following inscription is carved in 15th century characters: "CHRISTUS REX | VENIT IN | PACE DEUS | ET HOMO | FATUS EST". According to the historian Ignazio Pellegrini, in 1555 the bell tower was struck by lightning and had to be restored. A similar event occurred in the following century, in 1661, forcing the Dominicans to spend two hundred ducats to repair the damage.

The first five bells, in place since 1460, were in the key of Mi♭ minor and were recast several times over the centuries; the present concert was cast on August 12, 1839, by the Cavadini family "who had their furnaces at Bernarda, in Contrà de S. Nazar" and is in the key of C#. It also consisted of five bronzes weighing more than 45 quintals (15.61 - 10.89 - 7.85 - 6.41 and 4.52 quintals), which were tested on September 2 of the same month and consecrated the next day by Bishop Giuseppe Grasser. The Cavadini firm was again responsible for the production of an additional bell, called "sestina", weighing about 3.13 quintals, which was added on May 31, 1840, to which three more bronzes (2.43 - 2.07 and 1.42 quintals) from the church of Santa Maria in Chiavica were added in 1923, bringing the total to nine. (Note: Much of the history of the bells of Santa Anastasia has been reconstructed thanks to a manuscript diary kept in the Verona Civic Library and written by a certain Luigi Gardoni, a commoner who called himself "calzettar, suonador de campane e maestro de campanò". In Carregari & Carrara (1976, p. 10).) The Bell School of Santa Anastasia, founded in 1776, was the leading exponent of the art of Veronese bell ringing, and the names of the masters Pietro Sancassani and Mario Carregari are associated with it.

=== Interior ===
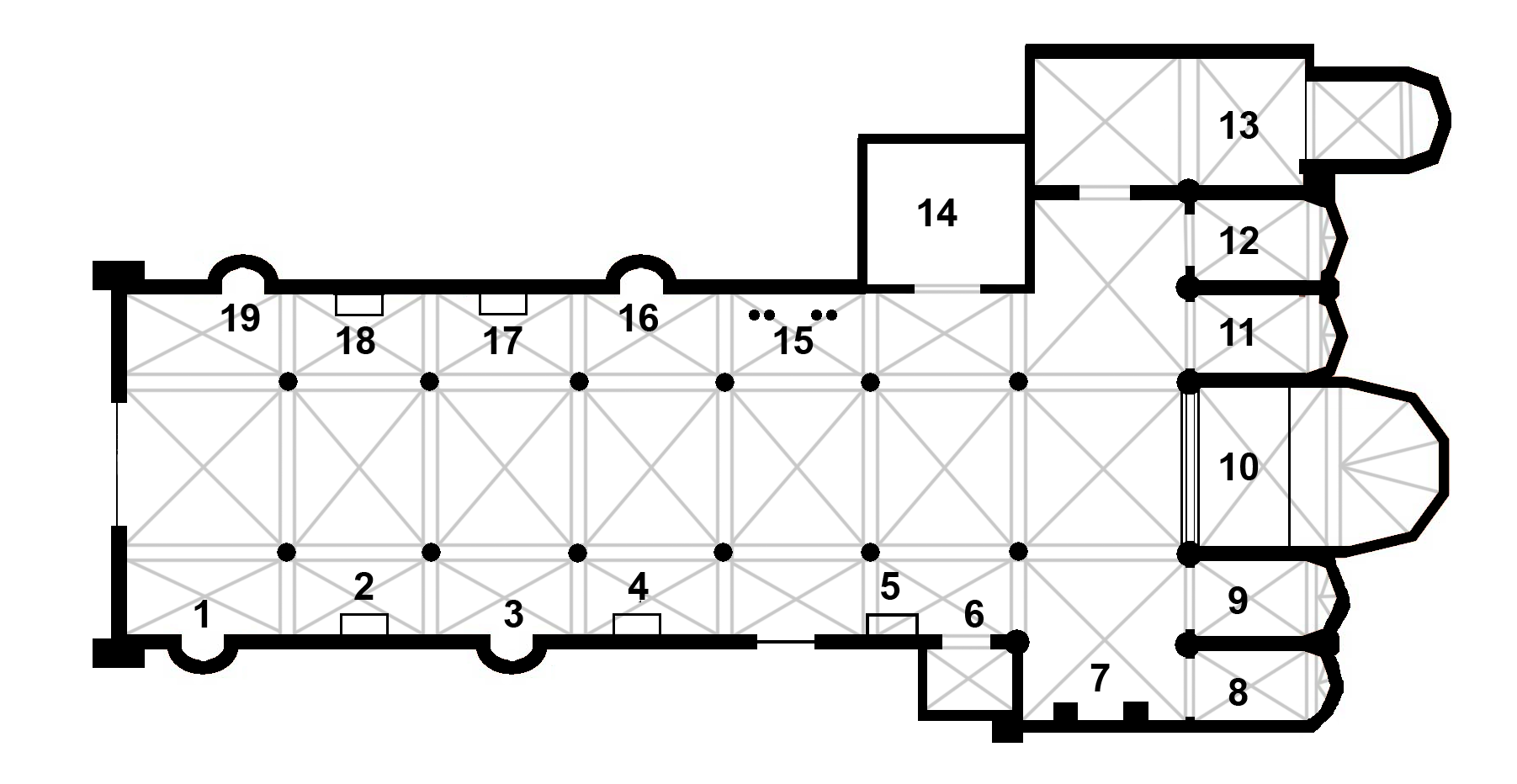
Plan of the church.: 1. Fregoso Altar; 2. Manzini Chapel; 3. Bonaveri Chapel; 4. Pindemonte Altar; 5. Mazzoleni Altar; 6. Chapel of the Crucifix; 7. Centrego Altar; 8. Cavalli Chapel; 9. Pellegrini Chapel; 10. Presbytery; 11. Lavagnoli Chapel; 12. Salerni Chapel; 13. Sacristy and Giusti Chapel; 14. Chapel of the Rosary; 15. Organ; 16. Miniscalchi Chapel; 17. Altar of St. Raymond of Penyafort; 18. Faella Altar; 19. Boldieri Chapel.

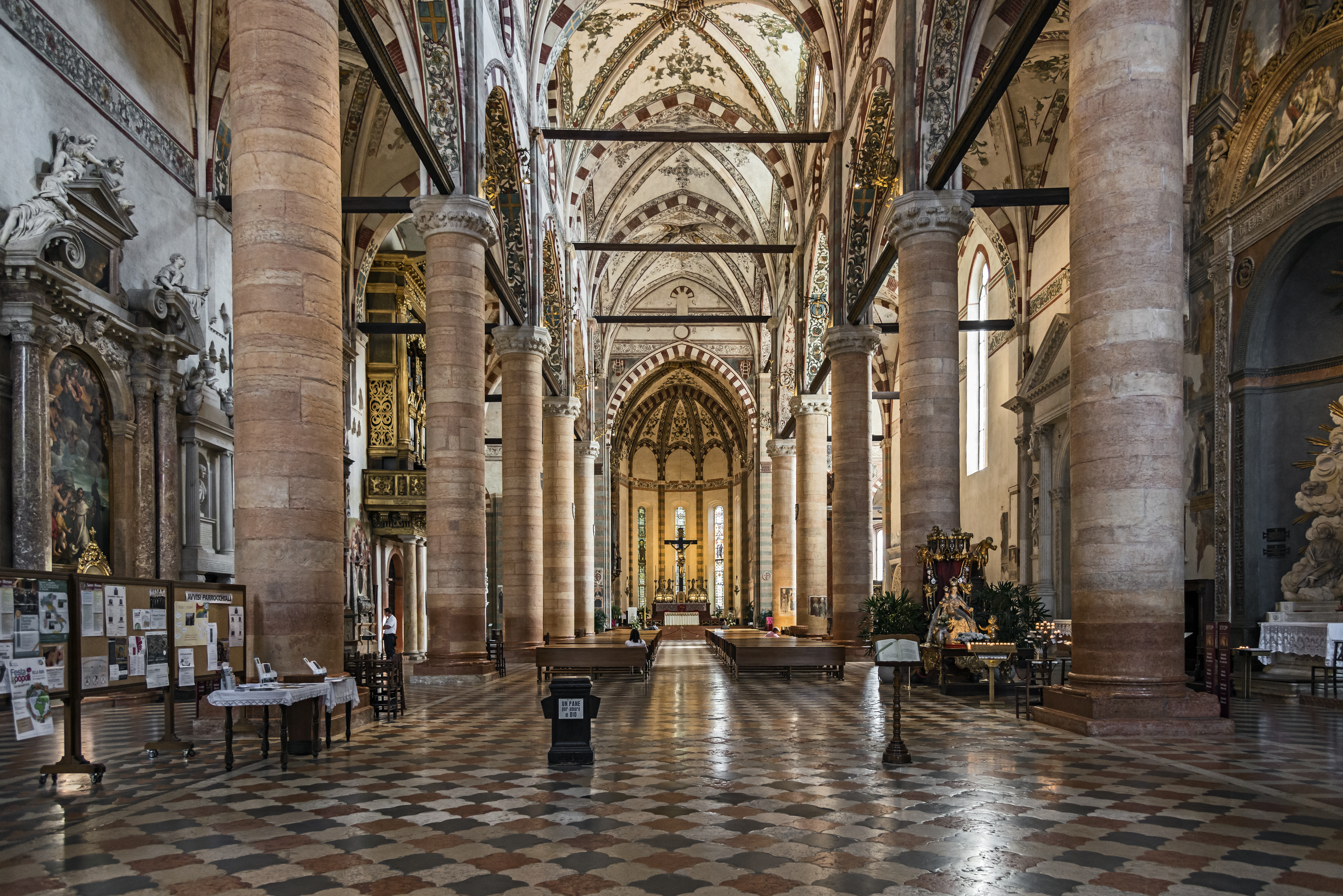
The interior seen from the nave towards the presbytery

The interior of the church, rich in works of art, is divided into three naves covered with cross vaults. The naves are separated by two sets of six cylindrical columns in white and red Verona marble with Gothic capitals. The two pairs of columns behind the high altar bear the coat of arms of the Castelbarco family of Avio, with its rampant lion: the Trentino family was one of the most generous donors to the construction of the building, and in particular Guglielmo di Castelbarco, former podestà of Verona, wanted to tie himself to the basilica by building the aforementioned funerary ark on the side of Piazza Santa Anastasia, a precursor of the Scaliger Tombs.

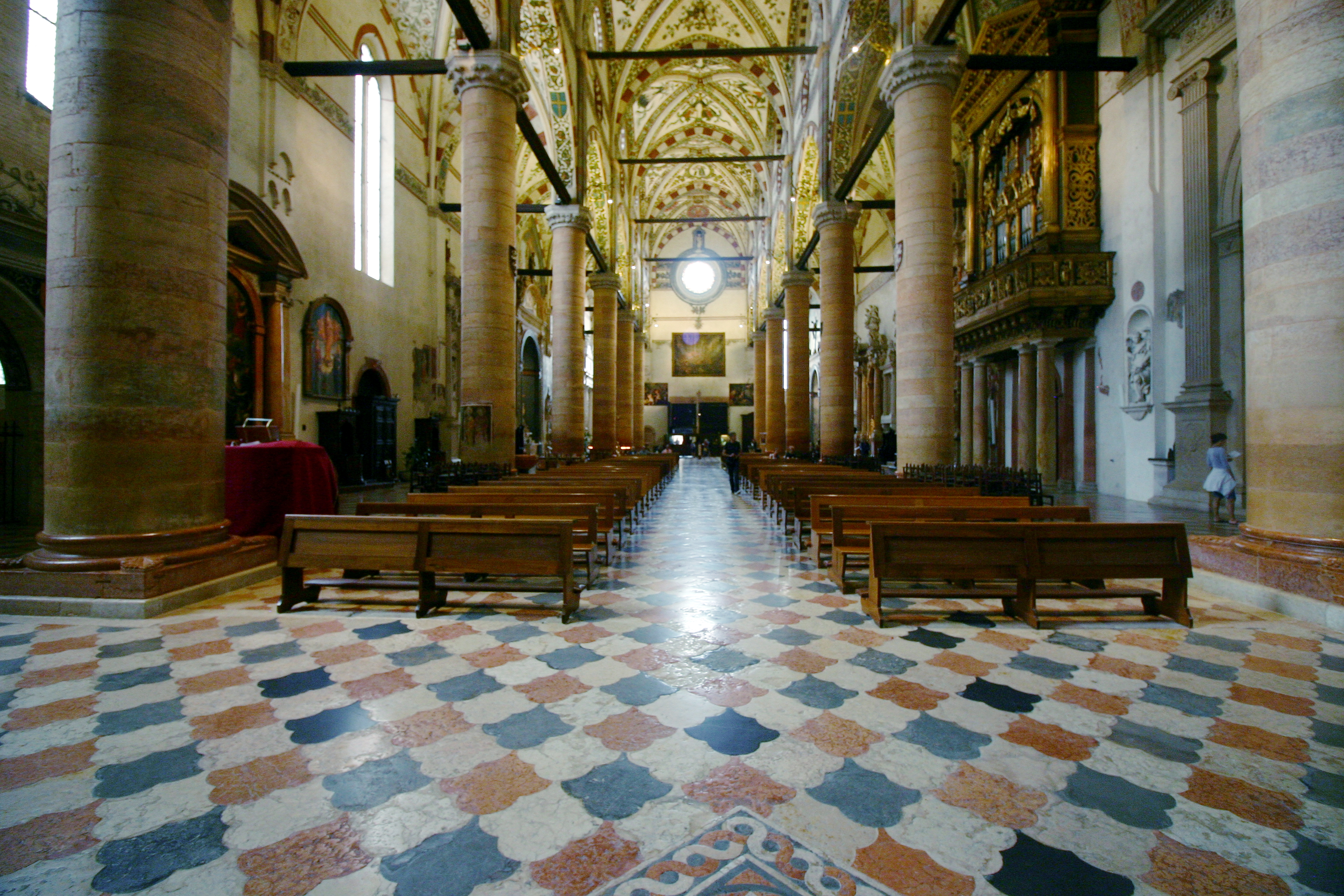
The interior seen from the nave towards the counter-facade

The floor plan is organized in the form of a Latin cross, thus presenting a large transept in front of the choir. The large apsidal area is divided into five apses, separated by plastered and frescoed Gothic pilasters ending in capitals. The central apse contains the presbytery and the high altar, while the side apses contain noble chapels, from right to left those of the Cavalli, Pellegrini, Lavagnoli and Salerni families. The walls of the longitudinal arm of the basilica are largely frescoed and enriched with altars, chapels and funerary monuments of illustrious Veronese citizens; as soon as one enters, on the wall to the right of the main entrance, there is a bust of Bartolomeo Lorenzi, a Veronese poet, placed at the behest of Ippolito Pindemonte, Marcantonio Miniscalchi, Silvia Curtoni Verza and Beatrice d'Este. The interior receives sunlight through large windows and a rose window placed above the portal.

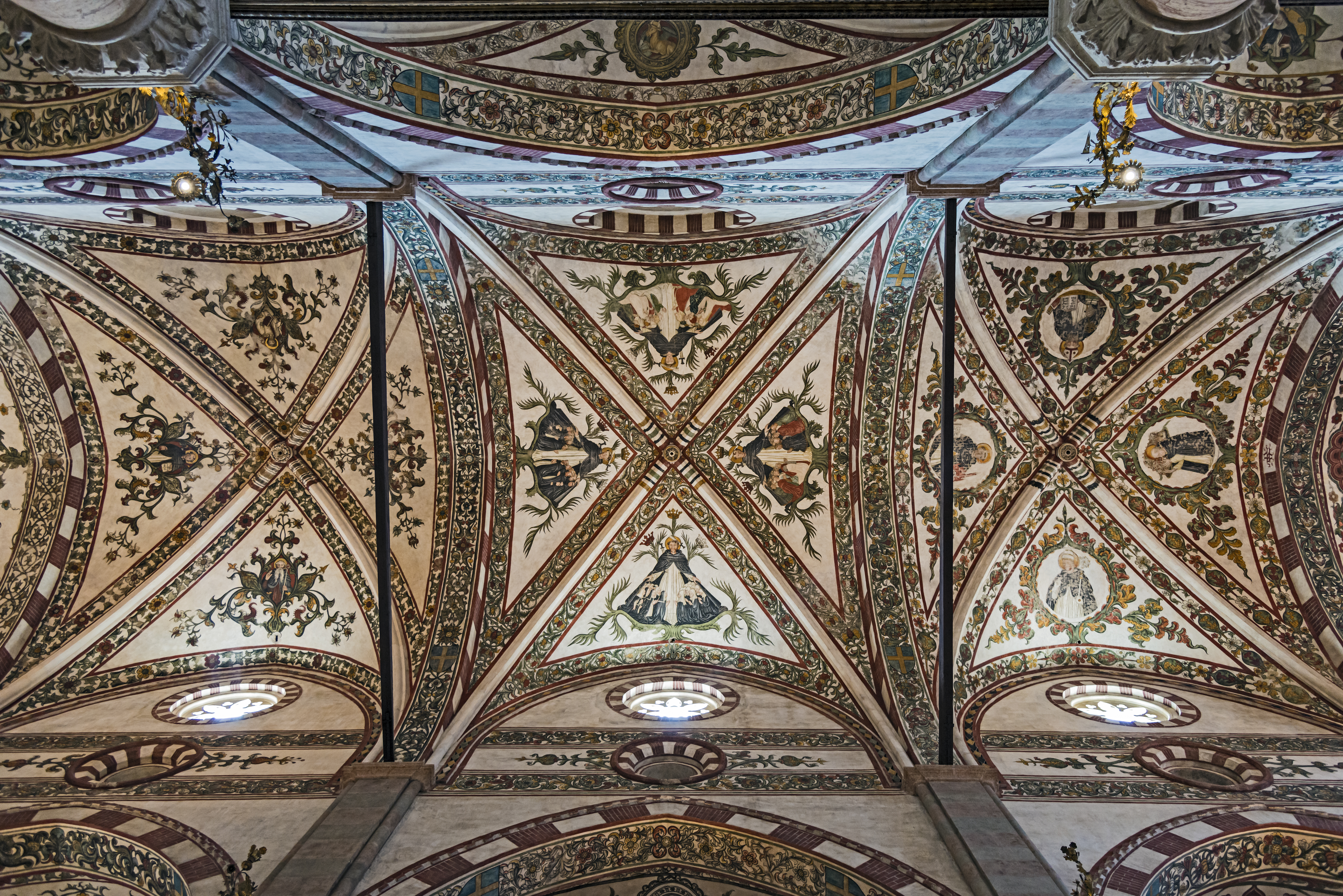
Ribbed cross vaults of the nave

The floor is still the original one, supposedly made by Pietro da Porlezza in 1462. It is made of marble in three colors: white Istrian, black basanite, recalling the robes of the Dominicans, and red, recalling that the church is dedicated to St. Peter the Martyr of Verona. The most elaborate parts are found in the nave and the transept, and in the center of the latter there is a rose window with the black and white rayed shield, the symbol of the Order. Neither the ancient chapels nor the sacristy show any traces of the ancient floor. Also traditionally attributed to da Porlezza is the red Veronese marble stoup located near the side entrance.

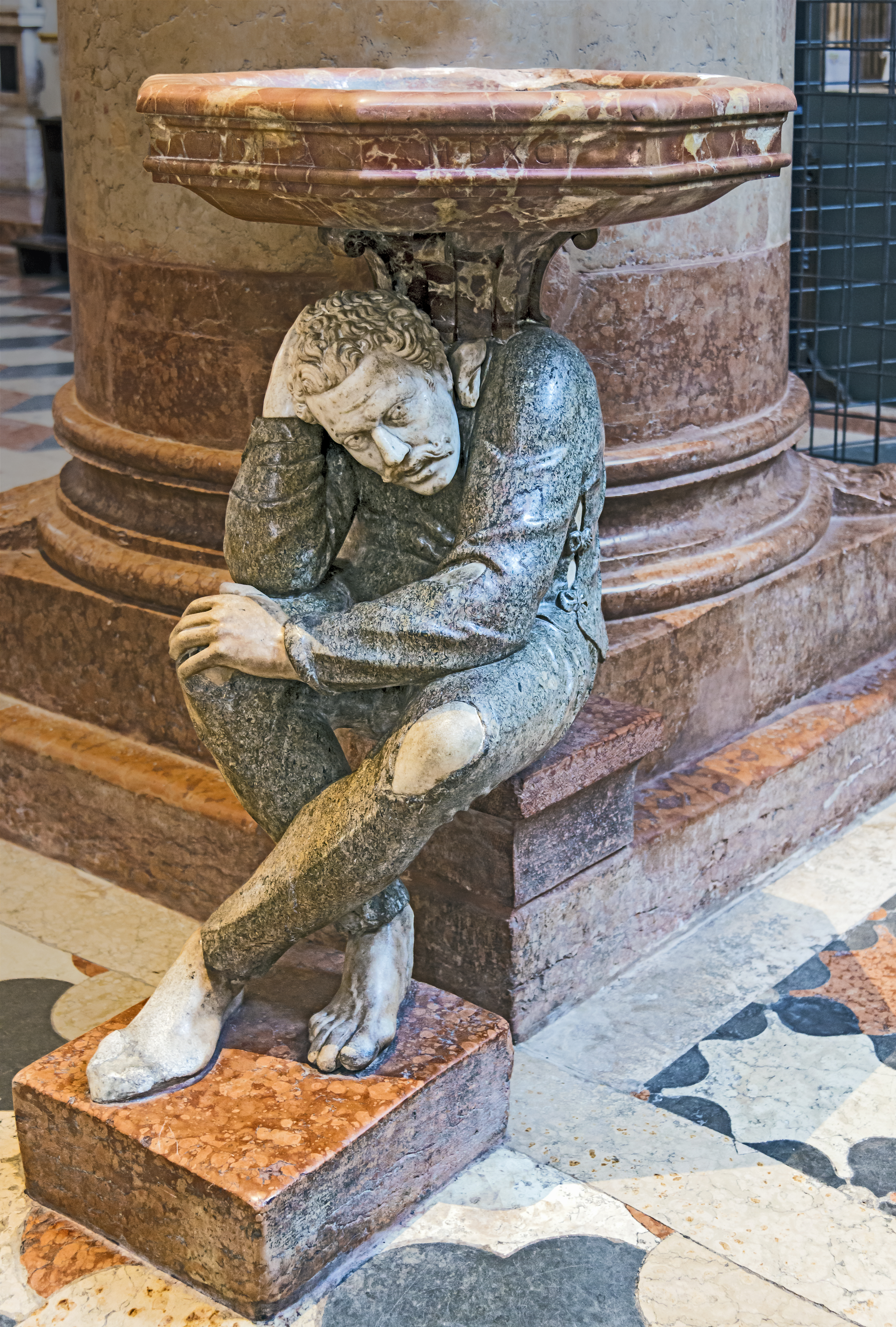
Stoup by Paolo Orefice

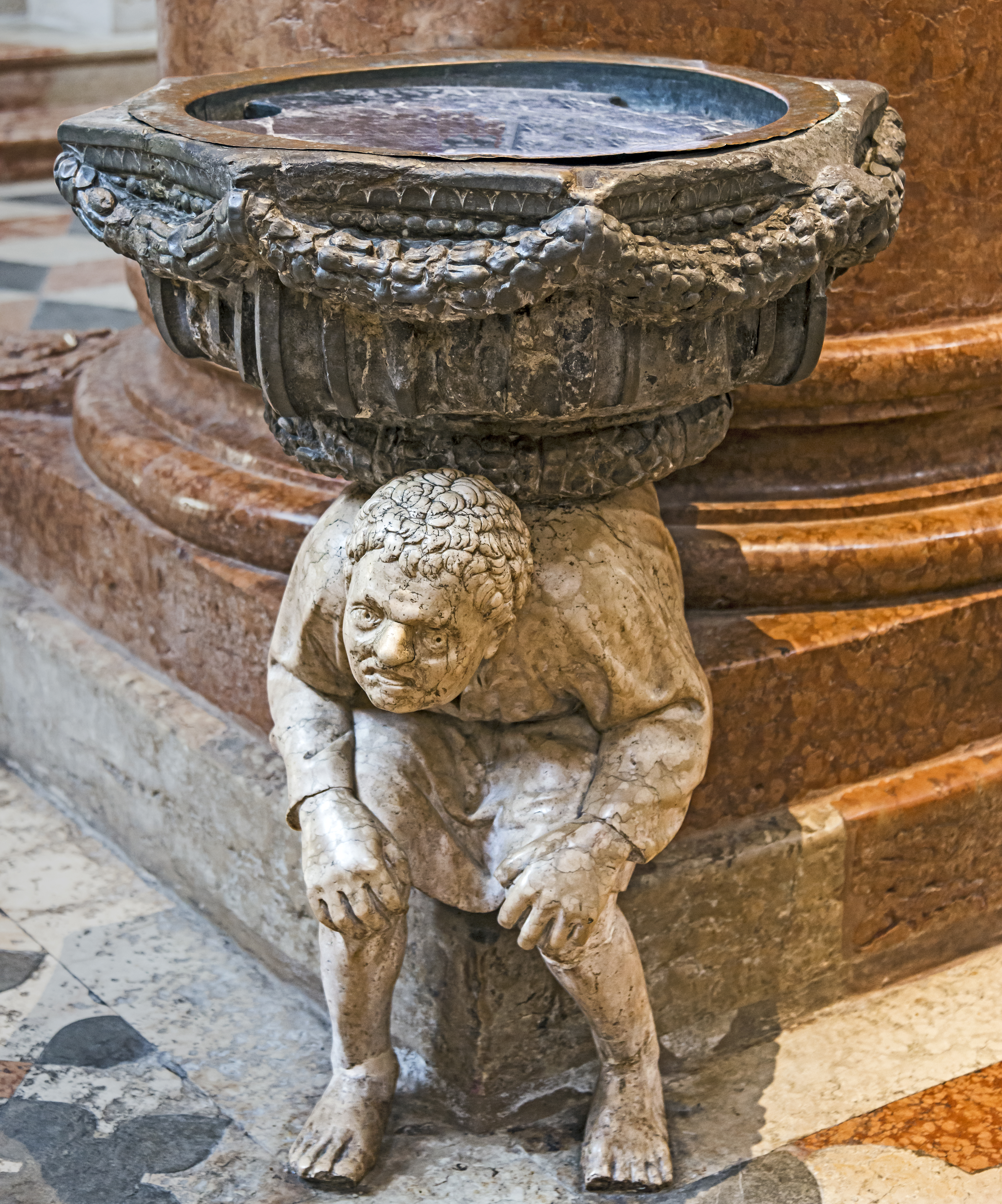
Stoup attributed to Gabriele Caliari

Two characteristic elements of the interior are the stoups, next to the first columns, supported by statues of two mustachioed hunchbacks, the first with his hands on his knees and the second with one hand on his head, in a pose expressing concern. The hunchback on the left, placed in 1491, is attributed to Gabriele Caliari, father of Paolo known as the Veronese; the second (also called Pasquino, because he entered the Basilica on Easter Sunday 1591), believed by many to be the work of Paolo Orefice, is made of red Verona marble.

In the fifth bay of the left nave there is a pipe organ built in 1625 in Baroque style, with a balustrade and gilded columns. The mechanical part was made by Giovanni Cipria from Ferrara, while the wooden part was made by Andrea Cudellino. Domenico Farinati restored it in 1937, reusing the 16th-century case and choir, while in 1967 it was overhauled and electrified by the Organaria di Padova. The instrument has tubular-pneumatic action and has two 61-note manuals and a 32-note concave-radial pedal; it has 30 stops, including two mechanical ones.

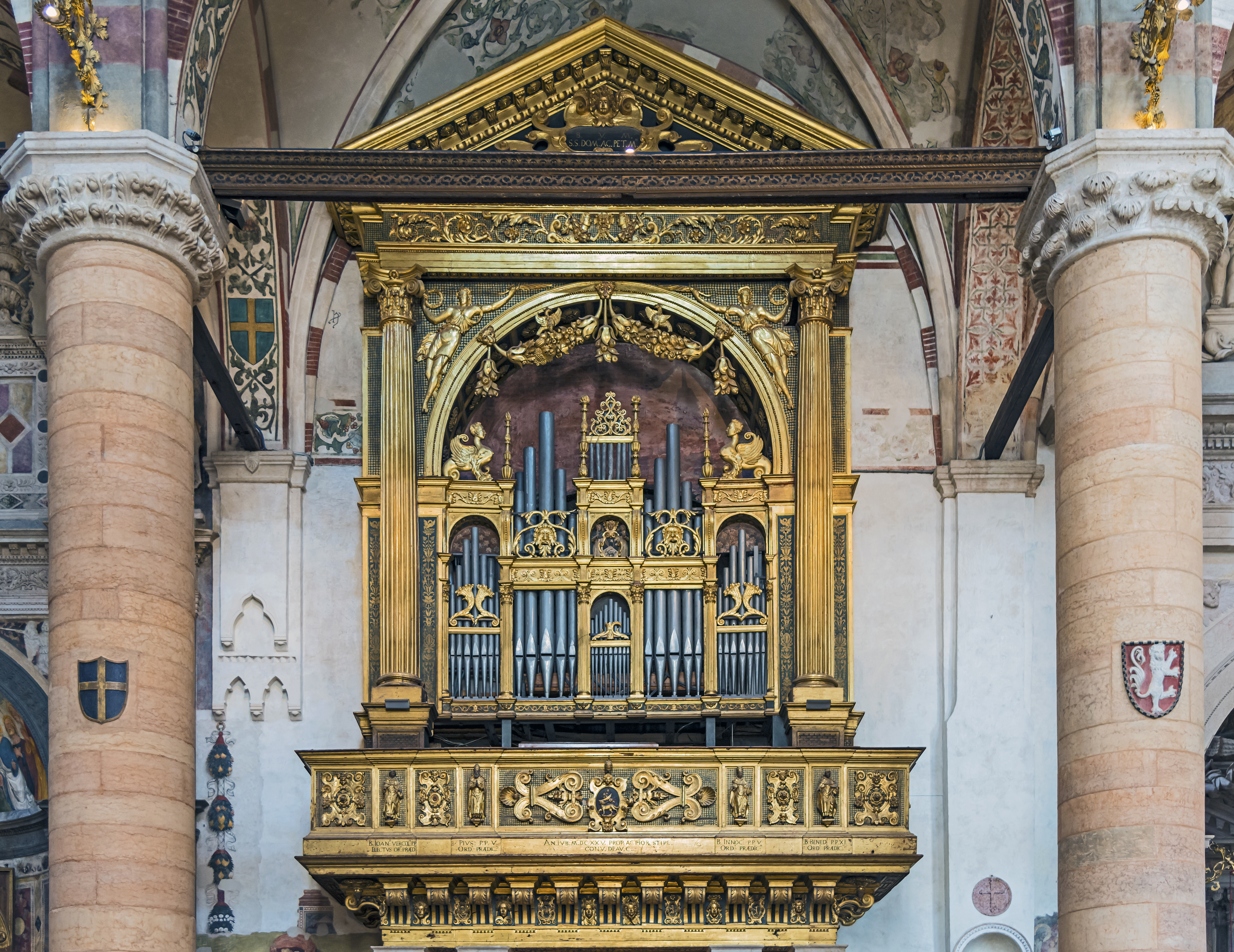
Organ case in the chancel

Phonic arrangement

I - Grand Organ
| Principal | 16' |
| Principal | 8' |
| Claribel | 8' |
| Vox Humana | 8' |
| Bourdon | 8' |
| Dulciana | 8' |
| Flute | 4' |
| Octave | 4' |
| XV | 2' |
| Mixture | 4 rows |
| Trumpet | 8' |

II - Swell Organ
| Bourdon | 16' |
| Principal | 8' |
| Viola | 8' |
| Voix Céleste | 8' |
| Flute | 8' |
| Flute | 4' |
| Octave | 4' |
| Nasard | 2.2/3' |
| Flageolet | 2' |
| Hautboy | 8' |

Pedal
| Contrabass | 16' |
| Sub Bourdon | 16' |
| Bourdon | 8' |
| Octave | 8' |
| Bass | 8' |
| Violoncello | 8' |
| Gamba | 8' |
| Trumpet | 8' |

==== Apsidal area ====
The area beyond the transept is divided into five apses where four chapels and, in the central one, the chancel with the high altar are located. They are described below from right to left.

===== Cavalli Chapel (8) =====
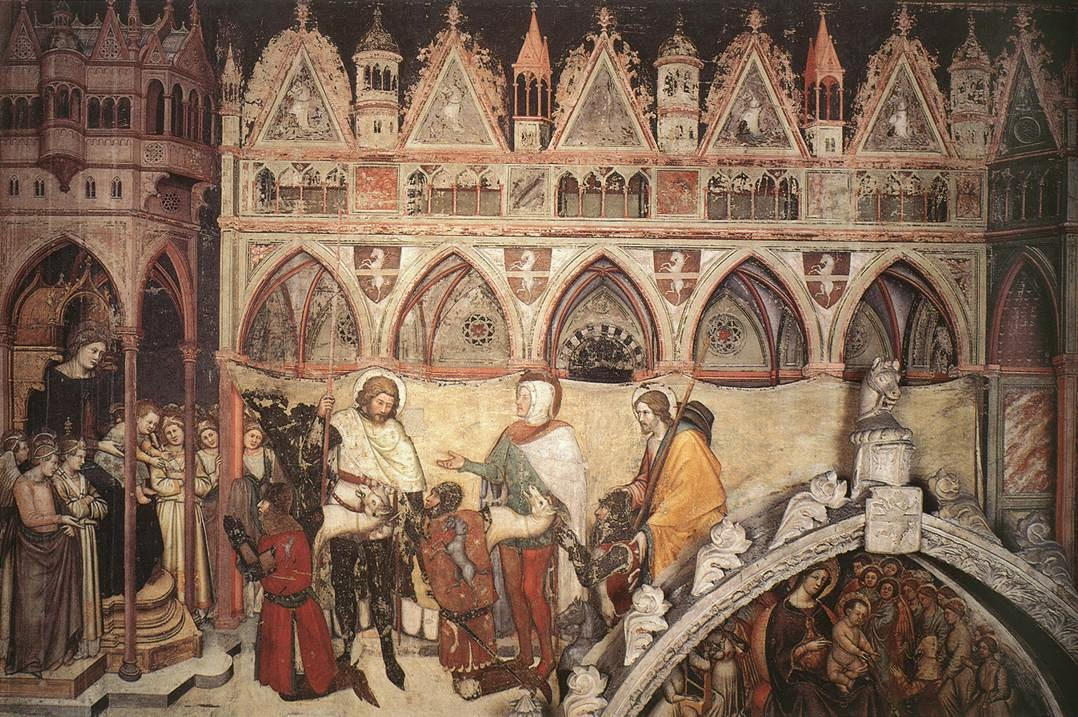
Cavalli Chapel, fresco depicting the Adoration of the Virgin, by Altichiero

The Cavalli Chapel, on the right side of the apse, is dedicated to St. Jerome, but was originally named after St. Geminianus; it is first mentioned in a document concerning a donation made by Giacomo, Nicolò, and Pietro, nobles of the Cavalli family, in 1375. On the right is the Adoration, the only certain work by Altichiero in Verona, (Note: In Verona, Altichiero had also painted a cycle of frescoes in the Palazzo Scaligero, now lost.) who perhaps painted it after his return from Padua, just before 1390, although some scholars date it to 1369 on the basis of a document found in the Veronese archives. In the painting, which represents an ancient feudal tribute, noble knights kneel before the throne of the Virgin placed in a Gothic temple. The painted arches show the noble coat of arms of the Cavalli family on the keystone. Below the fresco is the tomb of Federico Cavalli, made of red Veronese marble and enriched by a lunette containing a work by Stefano da Zevio from the first half of the 15th century. On the listel of the marble case, which is divided on the exposed sides, is an inscription as follows: “S. NOBILIS 7 EGREGII VIRI FEDERICI . 9 EGRE | GII VIRI DNI NICOLAI DE CAVALIS SVORVMQ . HEREDVM QVI SPIRITVM REDIDIT ASTRIS - ANO DNI M . CCC. LXXXX | VII MENSIS SEENBRIS."

The walls are also decorated with other frescoes: The Virgin and Child, St. Christopher, and the most valuable one, the Miracle of St. Eligius of Noyon, all three attributed to Martino da Verona, a painter who died in 1412. On the left is the fresco of the Baptism of Jesus, attributed to Jacopino di Francesco, a Bolognese painter of the first half of the 14th century, considered one of the fathers of Po Valley painting. The altar is adorned by an altarpiece painted by Liberale da Verona, in a richly carved and gilded frame.

===== Pellegrini Chapel (9) =====
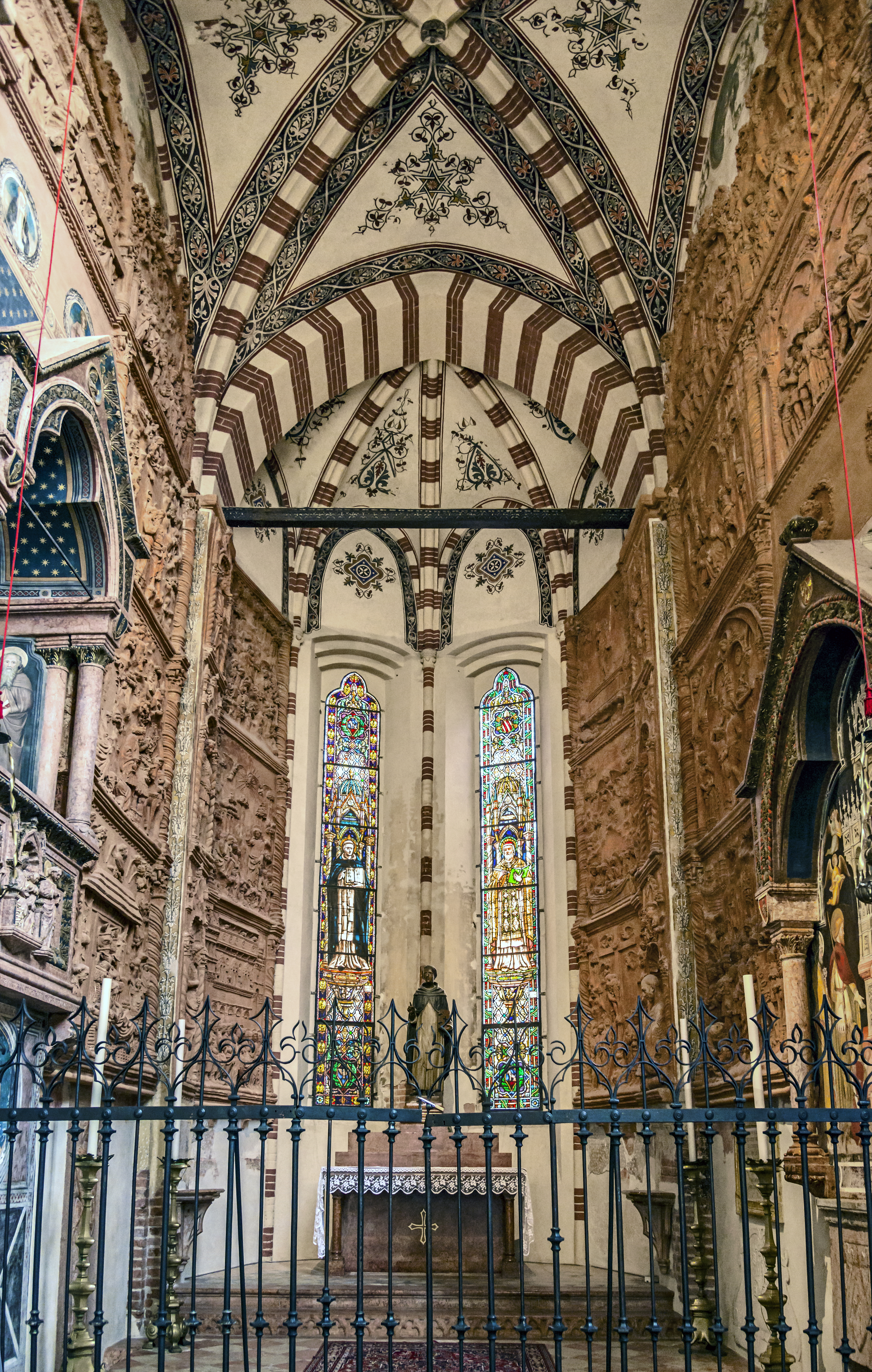
Pellegrini Chapel

The Pellegrini Chapel, to the right of the apse, belonged to the family of the same name, an important Veronese family that was ennobled by the Della Scala dynasty. The chapel is most famous for containing what is considered Pisanello's masterpiece, S. George and the Princess, frescoed on the outer wall above the entrance arch between 1433 and 1438. In this work, the late Gothic painter, who worked in the court society, evokes with a sharp and elegant technique a fabulous and chivalrous world. Also noteworthy are the 24 terracotta reliefs by Michele da Firenze, dated 1435, depicting various subjects, including scenes from the life of Christ, figures of saints and the patron Andrea Pellegrini.

Inside, leaning against the left wall of the chapel, there is a marble sarcophagus, decorated with the noble insignia of the Pellegrini family and decorated with sculptures, in which Tommaso Pellegrini, who enjoyed special favor at the Scala court, is buried. On the upper listel there is an inscription in a single line that reads: "SEPVLCRUM NOBILIS VIRI. D. TOMAXII DE PEREGRINIS ET SVORVM HEREDVM QVI OBIT XVI IVNII MCCCLXXXXII". The architectural design is attributed to Antonio da Mestre, while some of the frescoes, particularly those depicting Pellegrini kneeling before the Virgin and Child and various saints, are attributed to Martino da Verona. Also on the left is the tomb of William of Bibra, German ambassador of Frederick III to Pope Innocent VIII, who died in Verona in 1490 on his return from a diplomatic mission in Rome.

===== Presbytery (10) =====
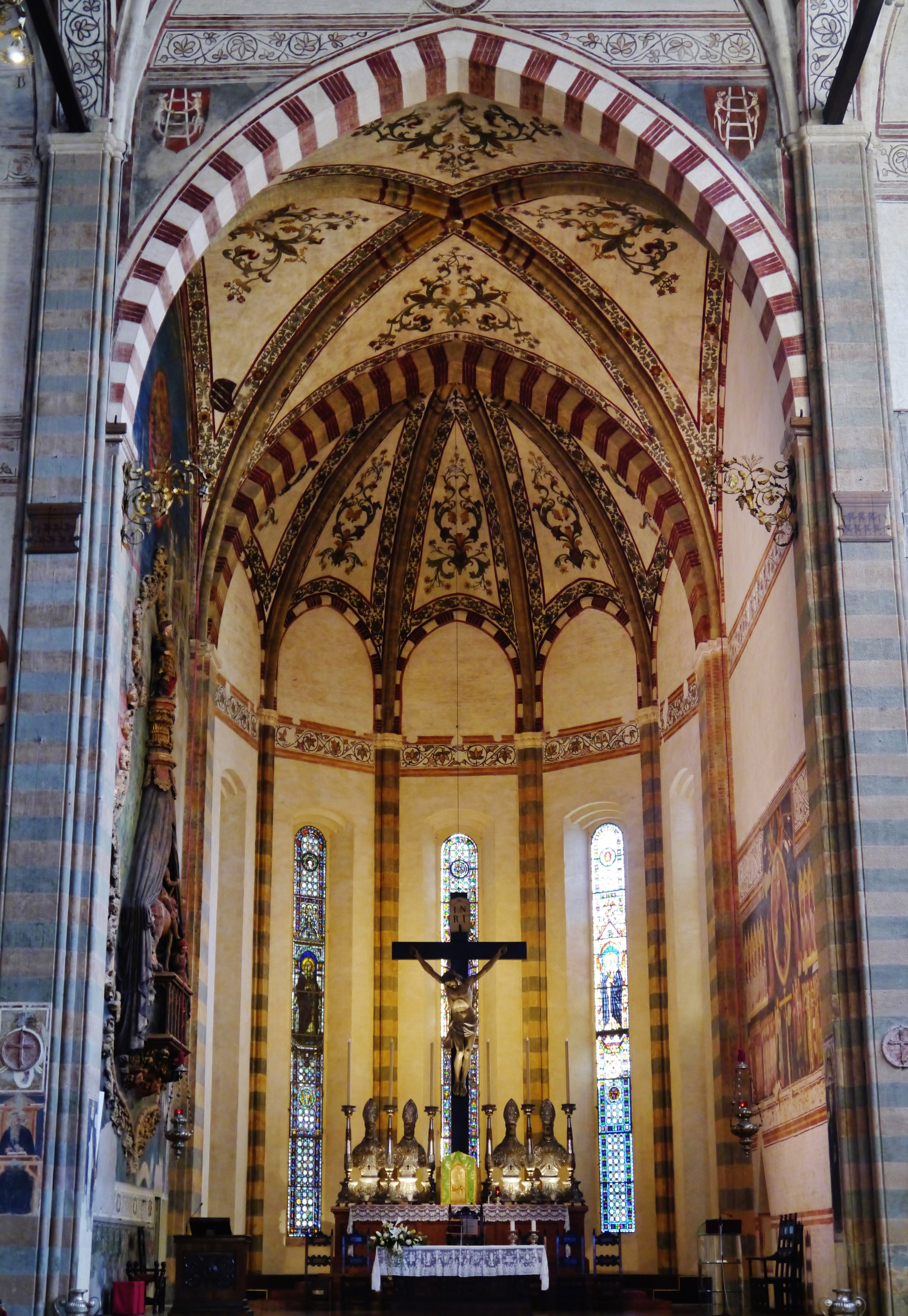
The presbytery with the high altar

The presbytery is raised a few steps above the rest of the basilica and occupies the entire area of the high apse, preceded by a square bay covered by a cross vault; on the right wall is the Last Judgement, attributed to Turone di Maxio, while on the left wall is the monument to Cortesia Serego, a condottiere in the time of the Scaligeri. The high altar, dedicated to St. Peter the Martyr, is made of light yellow marble and was built and consecrated in 1952; previously it was made of a red stone that was later placed at the base of the modern altar. In the center of the altar is a simple marble tabernacle, placed on March 22, 1529, at the behest of Alessandro dal Monte, who paid for it; above it is a large painted wooden crucifix.

The apse is polygonal and is lit by five high arched monoforas, closed by polychrome stained glass from 1935, depicting, from left to right, St. Thomas, St. Catherine of Siena, St. Peter the Martyr, St. Rose of Lima and St. Dominic de Guzmán. The central monofora was temporarily closed because an altarpiece depicting the titular saint, which no longer exists, was placed above it. On the triumphal arch is the coat of arms of the Della Scala family, who contributed significantly to the financing of the construction of the apse.

====== Monument to Cortesia Serego ======
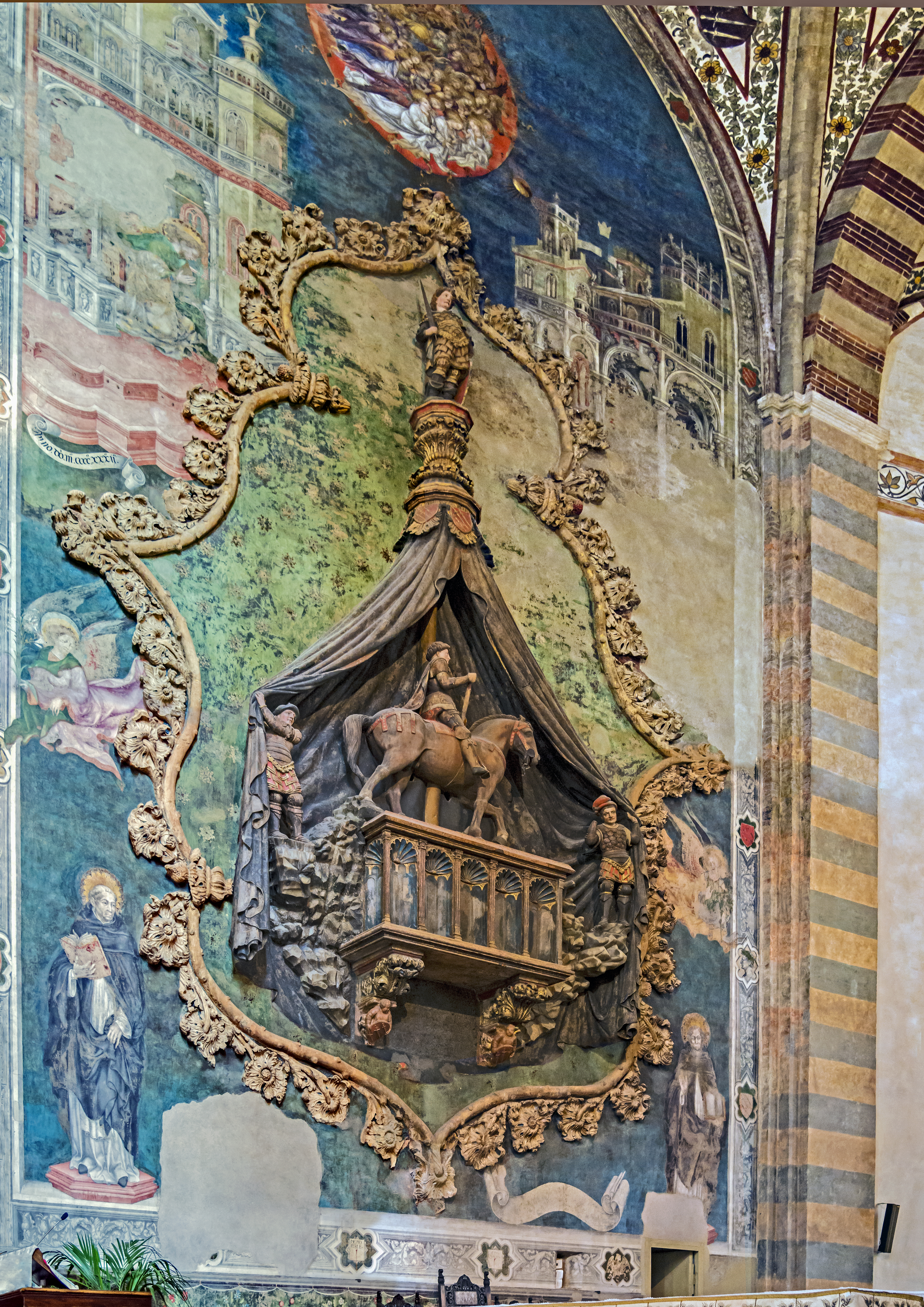
Monument to Cortesia Serego

To the left of the presbytery is the monument to Cortesia Serego, an interesting work for its mixture of sculpture and painting. The cenotaph consists of a central core in which the figure of Cortesia on horseback, wearing armor and holding the staff of command, stands out. Horse and rider are placed above the sarcophagus, which is divided into seven niches, five at the front and two at the sides, and the whole is set within a heavy stone curtain. Above the curtain are the coat of arms of the Serego family and the figure of the Archangel Gabriel.

The monument rises from a panel bordered by a flowering branch and is well integrated with the other representations inserted in the large frieze in shades of grey that frames the scene, the latter characterized by the presence of noble coats of arms and heads of Roman emperors; among the representations just mentioned, in the center of an elaborate urban setting, there is an Annunciation inserted in a mandorla, in which the Eternal Father finds space surrounded by a cloud of angels, while below are the two Dominican Saints Peter and Dominic, surmounted by two angels bearing their symbols. The base of the monument represents a frescoed velarium reminiscent of a millefiori tapestry.

The work was commissioned by Cortesia Serego's son, Cortesia the Younger, who wrote a will in 1424 in which he asked to be buried and commemorated with a monument in Santa Anastasia, although in 1429, in a new document, he wrote that the monument erected would be in memory of his father. It was probably sculpted by a Tuscan who had moved to Veneto for years: Pietro di Niccolò Lamberti, but some authors attribute its execution to Nanni di Bartolo, while the frescoed part could be by Michele Giambono, a Venetian artist.

===== Lavagnoli Chapel (11) =====
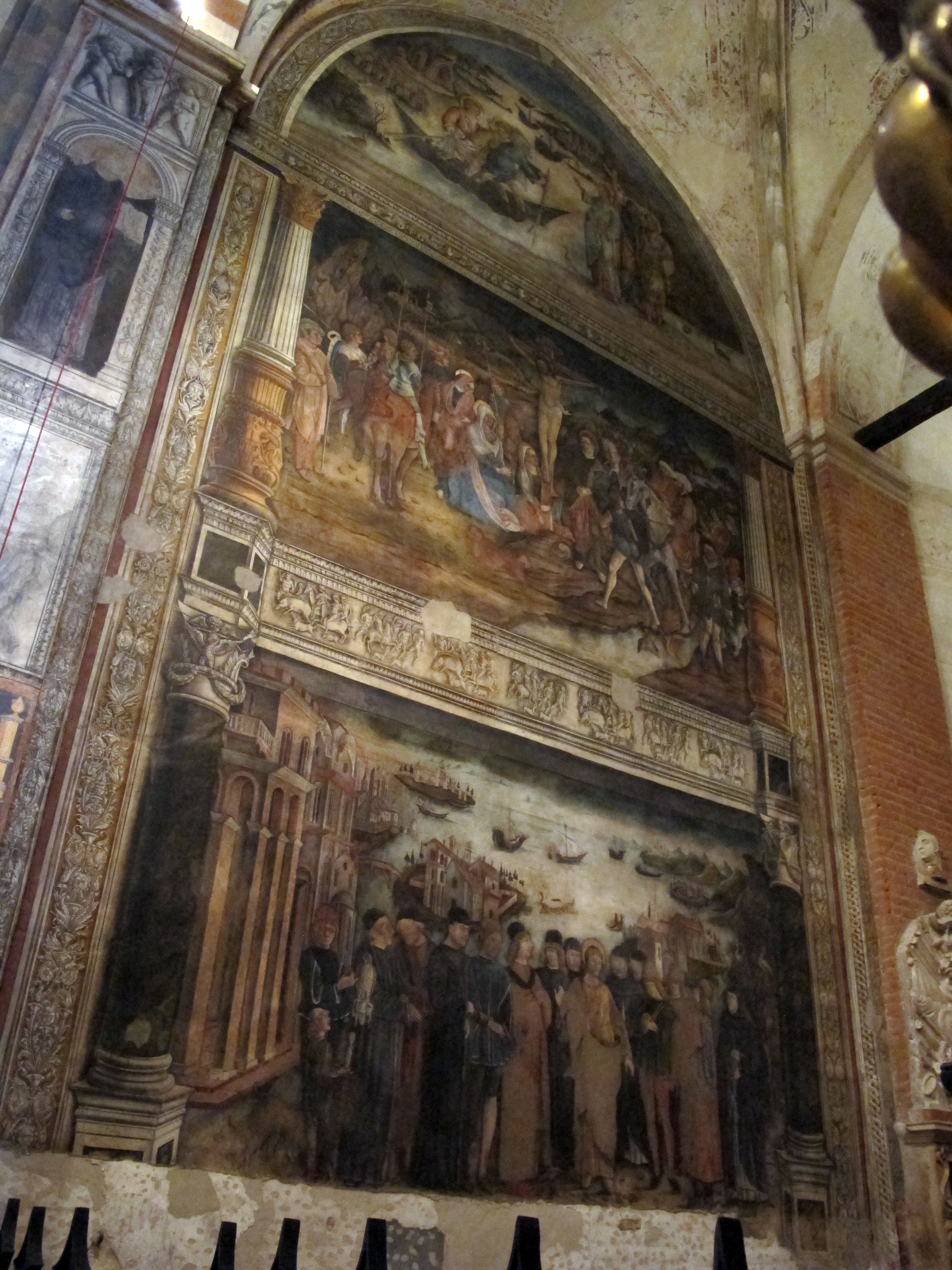
Lavagnoli Chapel, with the fresco cycle Crucifixion and Blessing St. James and Apotheosis of the Lavagnoli Family, attributed to Gian Maria Falconetto.

The chapel is dedicated to St. Anne, although until the 15th century the titular saint was St. John the Apostle; the earliest record dates from a testament dated January 19, 1480, in which a canon arranged to be buried there. (Note: The will stipulated that he should be buried "ante altare dicte capelle acquisite per ipsum testatorem a monasterio et fratribus dictorum fratrum Predicatorum". Two hundred gold ducats were also provided for its construction. In Marini & Campanella (2011, p. 151).) Inside, leaning against the right wall, is a sarcophagus containing the remains of Angelo and Marsilio Lavagnoli, adorned on the sides by two children holding the noble insignia of the Lavagnoli family, which had acquired ownership of the chapel in 1480. On the sarcophagus is carved in Roman characters an inscription that reads: "ANGELO, LAVANEOLO, AVO, MARSILIOQ. / PATRI. EX. VTRIVSQ. TESTAMENT / ANGELVS, ET IOANNES FRES. LAVA. / F. C. M. D. LXXX." The chapel originally had a Baroque altar, now lost, as well as the altarpiece by Francesco Fabi, which was moved to the Giusti Chapel.

The extensive restoration of the complex, carried out between 1879 and 1881, also affected this chapel: the Baroque altar in the center of the chapel was removed, but the old large windows were reopened to allow light to enter the interior. The restoration also made it possible to rediscover some of the frescoes that decorated the side walls: those on the right were almost completely destroyed to allow the construction of the Lavagnoli funerary monument, while those on the left were preserved. These are a cycle of frescoes intended to celebrate the power of the family, depicting episodes from the life of St. John the Evangelist, interspersed in the center of the left wall with a Crucifixion and a Blessing St. James and the Apotheosis of the Lavagnoli family. The latter are the work of a young Gian Maria Falconetto (who probably painted himself), while the rest of the cycle is by an unknown author, although the clear Mantegnesque origin of the paintings has allowed attribution to Francesco Benaglio or Michele da Verona.

===== Salerni Chapel (12) =====
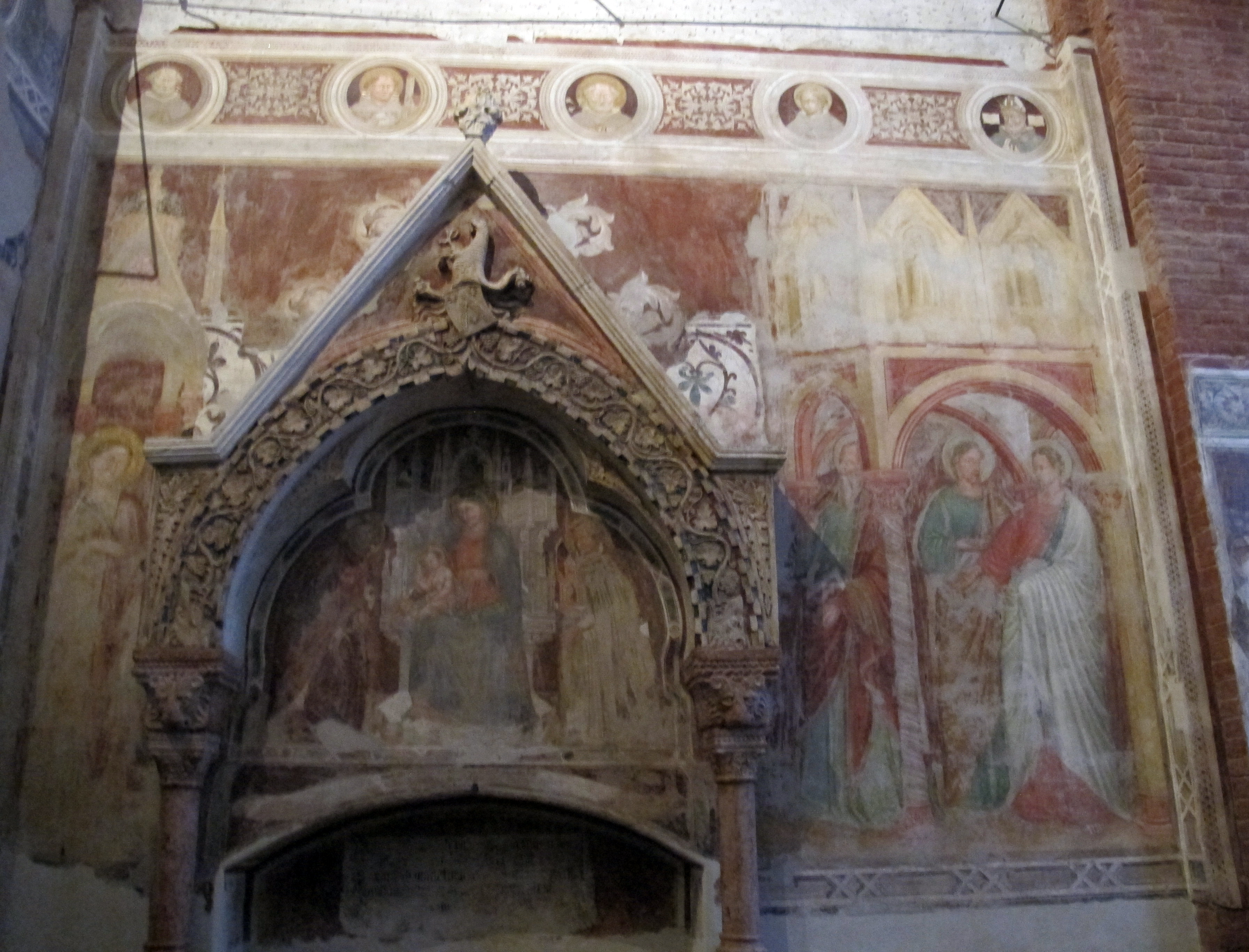
Salerni Chapel, with the sarcophagus of Giovanni Salerni and frescoes by Stefano da Zevio

The chapel was designated as his burial place in the testament of Giovanni Salerni, a member of a wealthy Verona family, written on October 25, 1387. His father Dolcetto had already ordered his burial penes ecclesiam Sancte Anestaxie. Later the chapel passed to the Arte dei Molinari e dei Mugnai and then to the Dominican convent. On the left, there is a funerary monument, built in a style that can be dated to the end of the 14th century, which contains the remains of Giovanni Salerni, founder of the Veronese branch of the family, who arrived in the city after being expelled from Pistoia, as the epitaph states; at the top of the pointed arch there is the coat of arms of the Salerni family, surmounted by a helmet.

The chapel preserves a series of frescoes painted between the end of the 14th century and the first half of the next. On the left are votive paintings by Stefano da Zevio, while on the right are others attributed to Bonaventura Boninsegna, a disciple of Giotto, including the Virgin among the Saints; at the far end on the right is another votive fresco by Giovanni Badile, namely St. James presenting a member of the Maffei family to the Virgin. This chapel also underwent a major restoration during the nineteenth century, when the old windows were restored and the murals were cleaned and freed from the plaster that covered them.

==== Right aisle ====
Listed below are the altars and chapels located on the right aisle, from the entrance to the apsidal area.

===== Fregoso Altar (1) =====
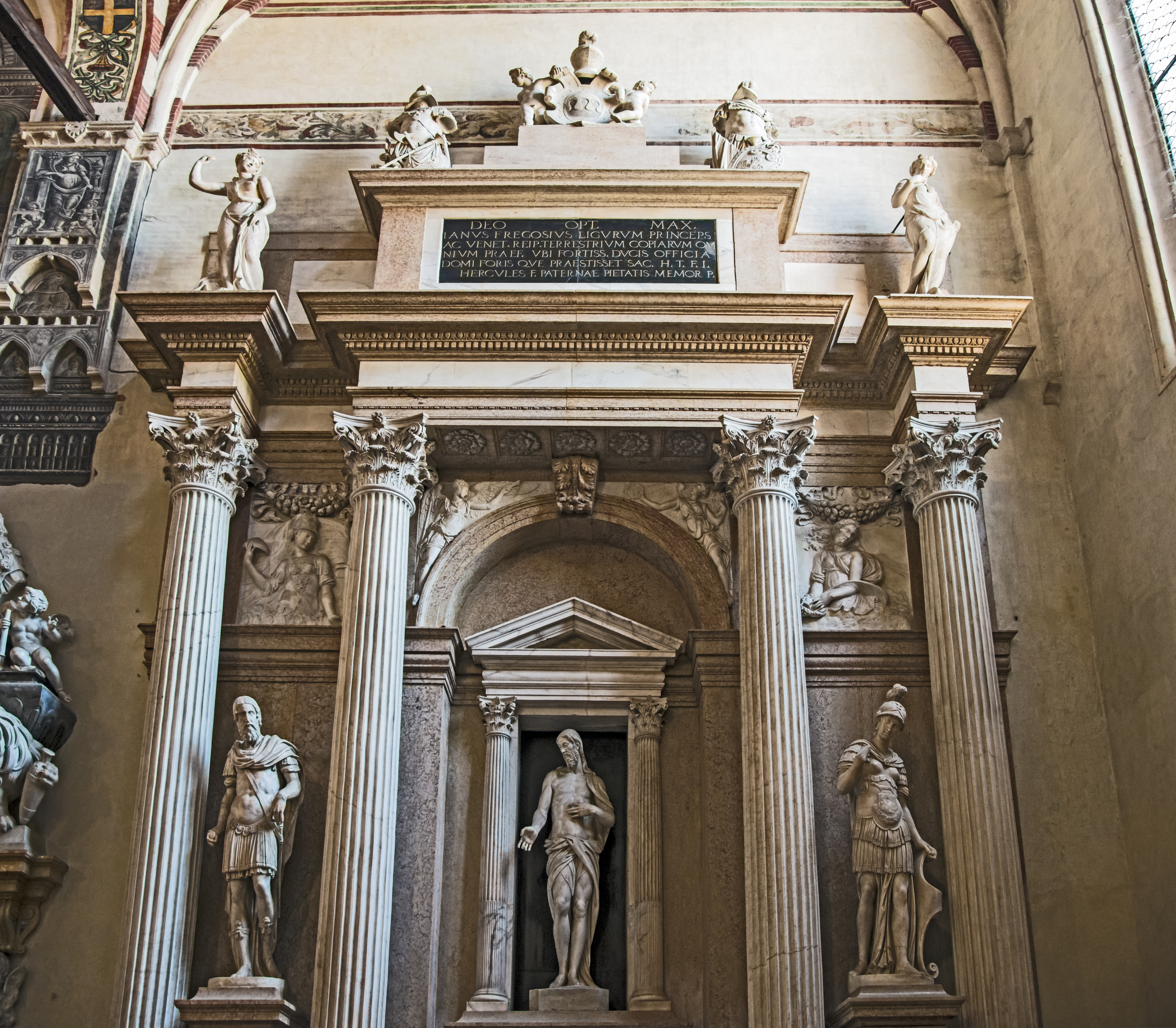
Fregoso Altar, made by Danese Cattaneo

The first altar encountered, on the right wall of the nave, is the Fregoso Altar. Dating from 1565, it stands where the Chapel of Santa Croce once stood, the first site of the tomb of Giansello da Folgaria. The altar, dedicated to the Redeemer (hence also known as the "Altar of the Redeemer"), was built in memory of the captain of the Venetian army, the Genoese Giano II Fregoso, who died in 1525, and was commissioned by his son Ercole to the Carrarese sculptor Danese Cattaneo, a disciple of Sansovino. Some scholars have suggested that the design and contours of the artifact were provided by Andrea Palladio, a friend of Cattaneo's, but debate on the matter has not reached a unanimous resolution. The altar was also celebrated by Giorgio Vasari in his most famous work, Le Vite. (Note: Vasari wrote: "This production has been highly extolled by the many persons who have seen it, but more particularly by Danese da Carrara, who saw it when he was at Verona busied with the works of the chapel of the Signori Fregosi, an edifice distinguished among all that is most beautiful in Italy". Giorgio Vasari, Le vite de' più eccellenti pittori, scultori e architettori.) He also provides a detailed description of the altar, focusing on the family coat of arms placed on the pediment, marked with the motto "potius mori quam scedari" and adorned with two putti.

The configuration of the altar resembles that of a triumphal arch with four free-standing columns of Corinthian order. Between the two columns on the left is a statue representing the condottiero, while on the right is another representing Military Virtue. The central statue, set in an aedicule, represents Christ the Redeemer, and on the pedestal is carved an inscription attesting to the authorship of the work by Danese Cattaneo: "ABSOLVTVM OPVS AN DO M D LXV DANESIO CATANEO CARRARIENSI SCVLPTORE ET ARCHITECTO". Above the entablature, there were two other statues with allegorical themes: Fame and Eternity. In front of the altar, the family tomb was excavated, surmounted by an oval stone on which the following epigraph was engraved in a single line: "HERCVLES FREGOSIVS IN QVO SVA POSTERORVMQ HVMANARENTVR OSSA M. P. C." On the wall is a herm set in memory of Abbot Bartolomeo Lorenzi.

===== Manzini Chapel (2) =====
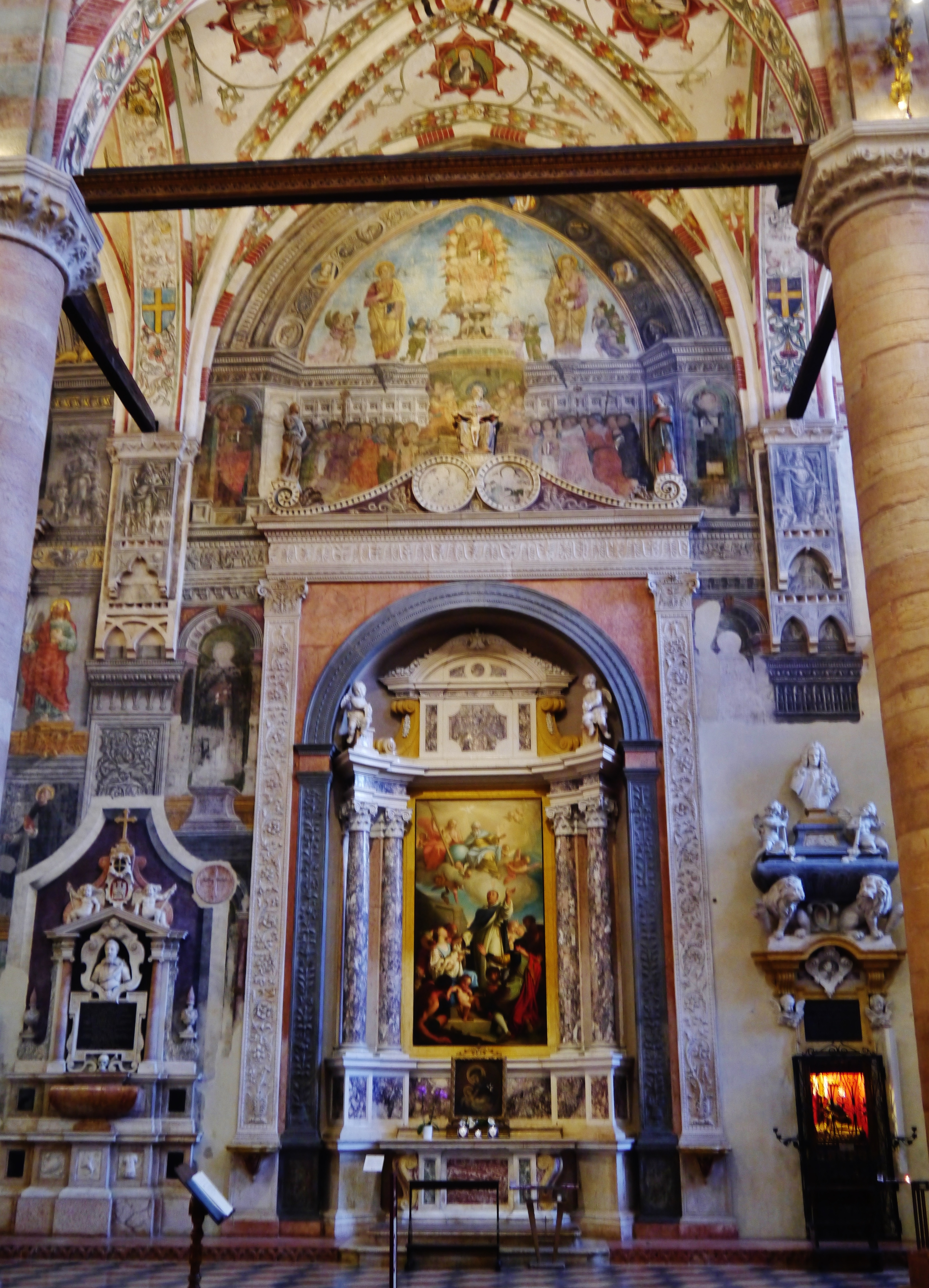
Manzini Chapel, with the altar dedicated to Saint Vincent Ferrer

The altar is dedicated to Vincent Ferrer, one of the most important Dominican saints, and is therefore called the "Ferrer altar." Its construction was ordered by Gian Nicola del fu Bartolomeo "da Manzinis" in his will of October 15, 1482, in which he also ordered the construction of his tomb, to which he assigned an annual dowry of 25 lire. The altarpiece depicting St. Vincent Ferrer resurrecting a child is the work of Pietro Rotari, while the surrounding band is the work of Pietro da Porlezza, who took on the task around September 1485. Around it are frescoes attributed to artists of the Mantegna school. Among the subjects depicted in the niches are St. Andrew, St. Lawrence the Martyr and St. Thomas Aquinas, in the center are devotees at prayer and above, in the lunette, saints surrounded by angels. At the top, forming a frame around the lunette, are profiles of Caesars and effigies of biblical figures.

According to the will of Gian Nicola's widow, the altar was originally adorned with the noble coats of arms of the Manzini and Maffei families and was dedicated to the Holy Trinity. Inside is the sarcophagus, the work of an anonymous sculptor, of the Corsican Francesco Maria Ornano, a member of the Ornano family, who died in Vicenza in 1613. In 1700, the heirs of the family gave it to the devotees of St. Vincent, who later commissioned the Rotari altarpiece. On the right of the altar, on a wall, there is a small monument to Vincenzo Pisani, podestà of Verona in the second half of the 18th century, made by Giovanni Angelo Finali to a design by Adriano Cristofali.

===== Bonaveri Chapel (3) =====
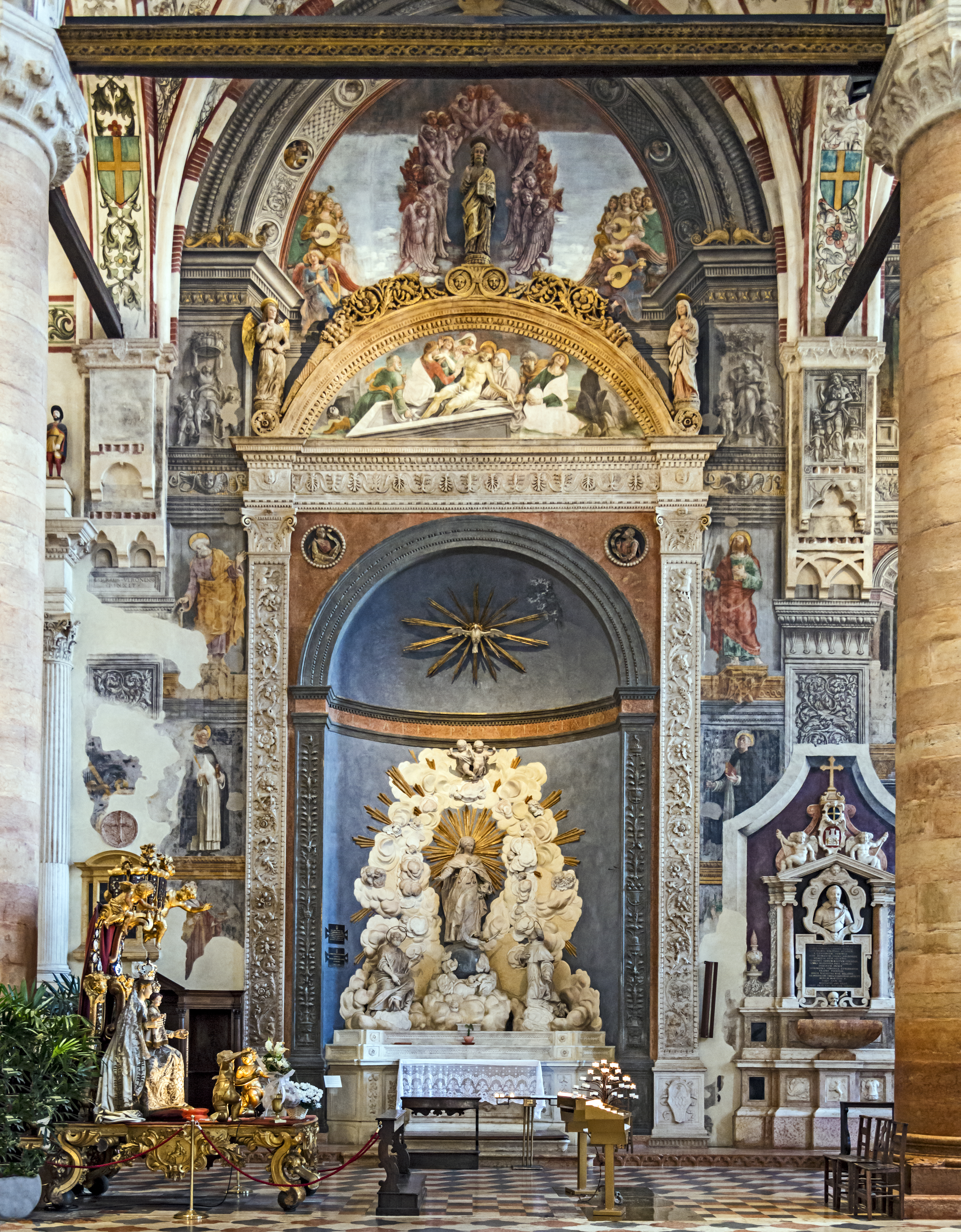
Bonaveri Chapel

Also known as the "Bevilacqua-Lazise Altar", or the "Altar of the Immaculate Conception", it was originally dedicated to Mary Magdalene and was owned by the Bonaveri family, together with the associated tomb, as it was built with the bequest of Pietro Bonaveri. On August 3, 1590, the convent sold it to Ottavio and Alessandro Bevilacqua for 300 ducats, and the Bonaveri coat of arms was replaced by that of the Bevilacqua family. The bas-reliefs in the vault date from the late 15th century, while the lunette fresco is by Liberale da Verona, set in a curved tympanum. The sculptural group of the altar of the Immaculate Conception, Immaculate Conception with St. Anthony of Padua and St. Joseph, is a work traditionally attributed to Orazio Marinali of Bassano and was brought here in the early 19th century from the Oratory of the Conception in the former church of Santa Maria in Chiavica; the jambs and the arch are in marble with very fine carvings of the 16th century, possibly the work of Pietro da Porlezza.

On the sides of the chapel are frescoes by Liberale da Verona (c. 1490), rediscovered and restored in the late 1960s. In these paintings, done in grisaille technique, there are five figures of saints (on the left and from above Peter the Apostle, Peter the Martyr, Lucy, on the right Paul and Dominic) and two with an unknown subject, all placed at the side of a lunette in different registers, in which there is a Pietà surmounted by the large painting of the Chorus of Angels.

===== Pindemonte Altar (4) =====
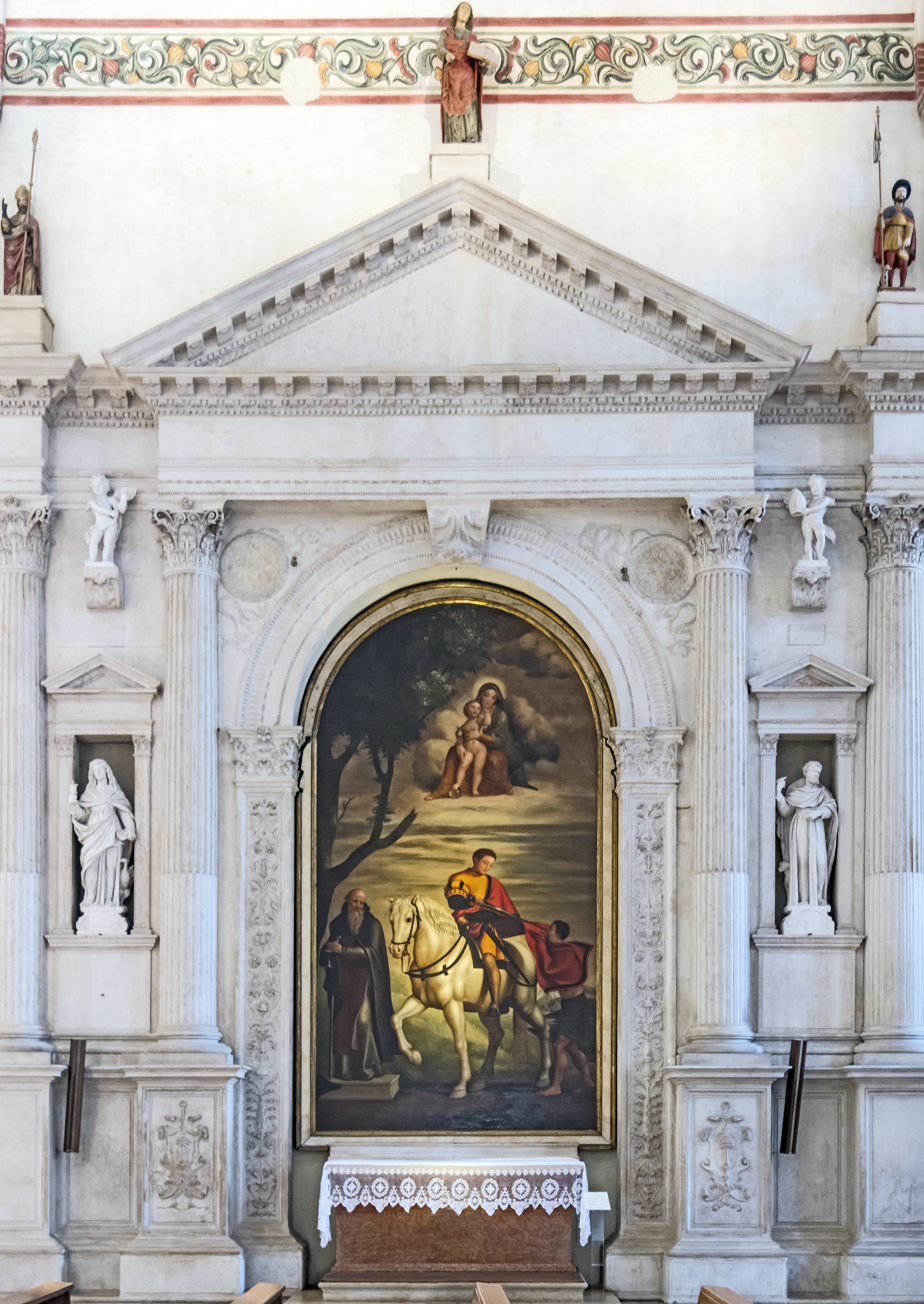
Pindemonte Altar; the altarpiece is by Giovan Francesco Caroto

Dedicated to St. Martin, it was built in 1541 at the behest of Flavio Pindemonte, as can be seen from the inscription on the family tomb on the right wall: "FLORIVS PINDEMONTIVS || NOBILITATE PRAEFVLGENS || JOANNI VENETORVM || MILITVM DVCTORI || INCLITO AC DESIDERATO || CARISS. FRATRIBUS || AEDEM HANC POSVIT || CVM SEPVLCRO || M D XLII."

The altar, an imitation of the front of the Gavi Arch, a Roman monument in Verona, was made by a stonecutter whose name is known only as Francesco. The large red marble sarcophagus in which the Bishop of Verona, Pietro della Scala, was buried, with a cross carved in relief, serves as an altar. In 1828, the poet Ippolito Pindemonte was also buried in the same altar, together with his family members Fiorio and Giovanni. The altarpiece, a late work by Giovan Francesco Caroto dated 1542, depicts St. Martin giving his cloak to a poor man, with the Virgin in glory, in which one of the famous sunsets by the Veronese painter can be seen. (Note: Vasari in The Lives said the following about this work: "But when Giovan Francesco became old, he began to give evidence of deterioration in his art".) Caroto was a pupil of Liberale da Verona, from whom he derived formal and chromatic tendencies, but he was also influenced by Mantegna; his brother Giovanni collaborated with the historian Torello Saraina on a work aimed at rediscovering the city's antiquities, which suggests his contribution to the inspiration of the stonecutter for the Roman arch. On the sides, in niches surmounted by an entablature, are two statues of St. John the Evangelist and St. Dominic, dating from the 18th century, and on the wall is a small monument in honor of Isotta Nogarola.

===== Mazzoleni Altar (5) =====
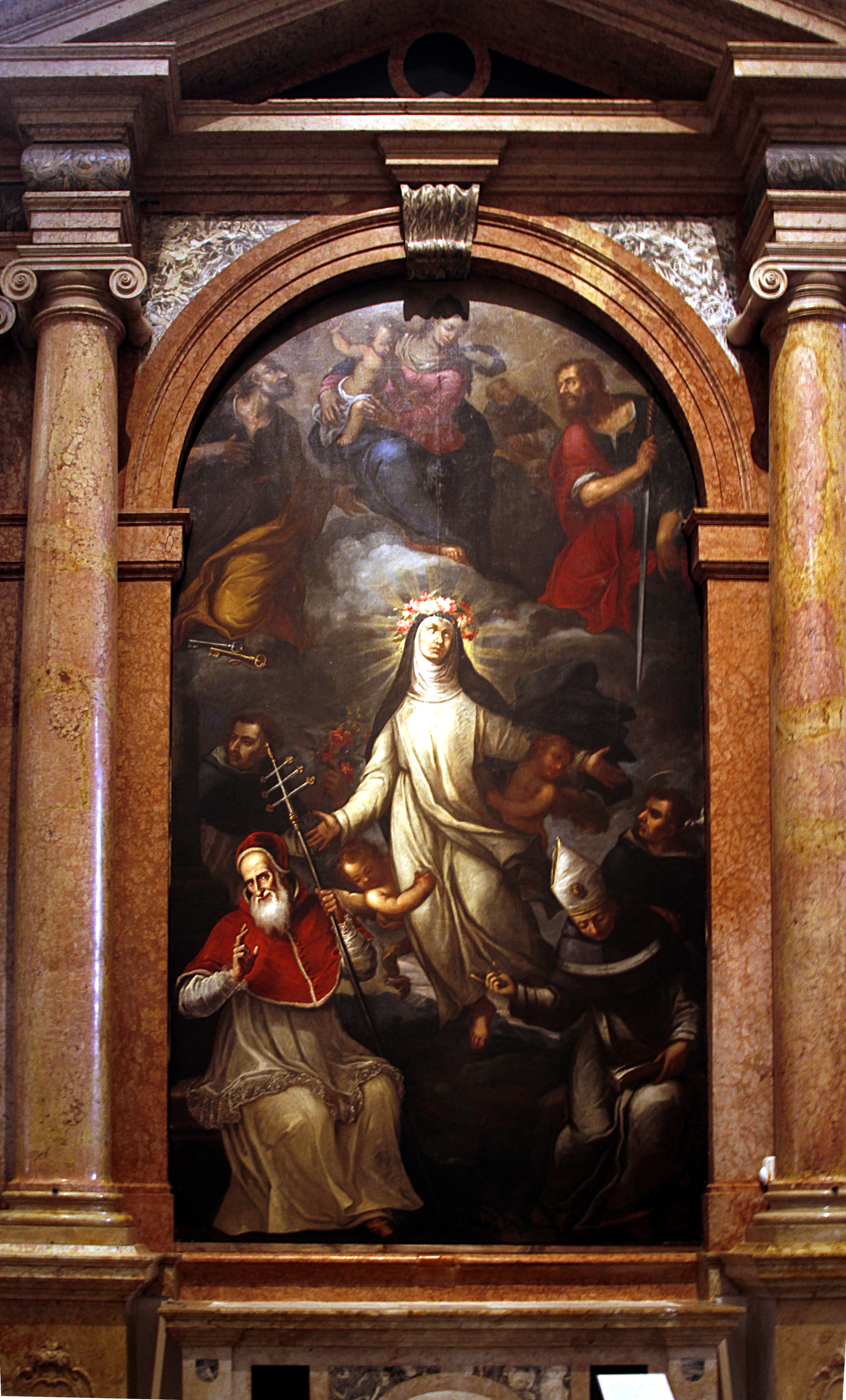
Mazzoleni altar, with the altarpiece of Saint Rose of Lima, painted by Giovanni Ceffis.

Also known as the "Altarpiece of Saint Rose of Lima", it is a Baroque altar considered by Carlo Cipolla to be of no particular historical or artistic importance, but recently reassessed. As indicated on a pedestal next to the Mazzoleni family coat of arms, the altar was made in 1592. On the right is the tomb of the family that commissioned it, built in 1602, where the brothers Giacomo, Bartolomeo and Francesco are buried. At first, in the 17th century, it was dedicated to St. Raymond of Penyafort, but by the middle of the next century it was named after St. Rose of Lima, who was beatified by Pope Clement IX in 1668 and was the first saint canonized in South America.

The altar consists of two freestanding Ionic columns in red marble enclosing an aedicule surmounted by a curvilinear tympanum. It has been speculated that the architectural design is the work of Paolo Farinati or his workshop. The altarpiece was originally the one now in the altar of St. Raymond, begun by Felice Brusasorzi; the present one, depicting the titular saint, is the work of the Veronese artist Giovanni Ceffis, who created it between 1668 and 1688. Behind the altar is a reliquary consisting of a series of crystal shrines.

===== Chapel of the Crucifix (6) =====
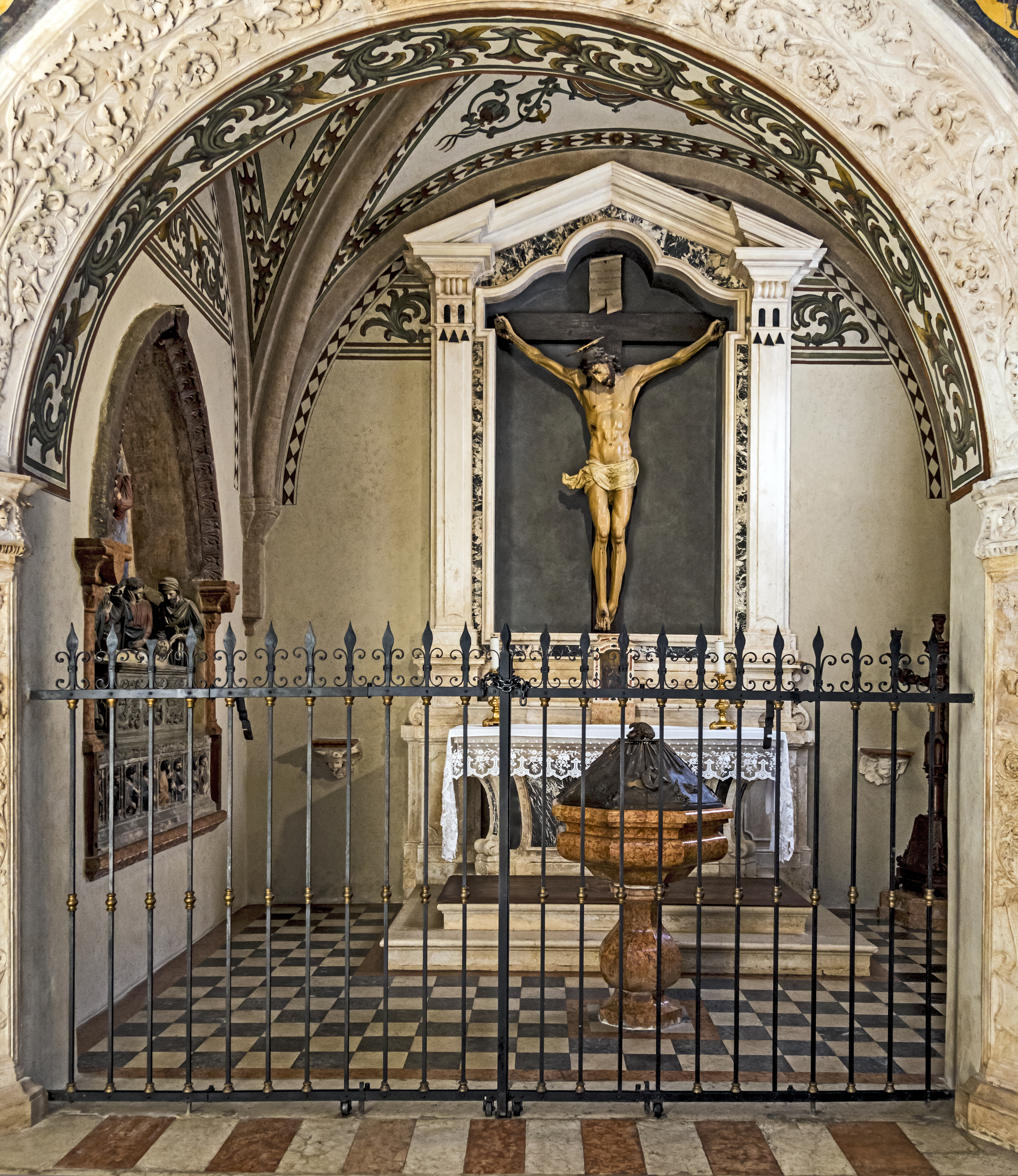
Chapel of the Crucifix.

At the end of the right wall of the nave, just before the transept, there is a small chapel with a cross vault, entered through a semicircular arch. On the outside, there are decorations believed to date back to the 13th century, but which, according to the Veronese historian Simeoni, are not remains of the ancient church, (Note: Simeoni argues that this is not the old church, unless one assumes that the friars who lived here between 1260 and 1290 had found time to partially rebuild the old church by constructing a building that preceded the great structure.) a position not shared by all. Other authors, such as Carlo Cipolla, see in this chapel the remains of a 13th-century building that had nothing to do with the present structure, but which, for unknown reasons, had to be preserved: the former church of Santa Anastasia, a position not supported by any historical or architectural evidence.

Returning to the interior, the chapel has a typical 13th-century layout: at the front, there is an arch and columns that are a fine example of 15th-century Veronese ornamental sculpture. Noteworthy are the elaborate sculptural details representing leaves, flowers, fruits and animals. Less rich in details is the sculpture of the monument, which is in an older style, closer to that typical of the 14th century. The sepulchral monument that now stands on the wall used to stand where the altar of Fregoso now stands. The inscription in 14th-century Gothic letters on the upper listel of the ark reads: "S.IOANNIS.DCTI.IANEXELLI.DNI.BERTOLDI.QUI.FVIT.FOLGARIDA.DE.CLAVICA.VERONE". The deceased buried here, Gianesello da Folgaria, wrote his will on November 10, 1427, and on that occasion he left bequests for the construction of the roof of the basilica, for the construction of a chapel and an altar. In addition to Gianesello's tomb, the chapel also contains the remains of Francesco Pellegrini, who oversaw its restoration in 1484.

The Burial of Christ, made of painted tuff by Filippo Solari, is in the Gothic style. On the base there is a bas-relief carved with eight apostles. The wooden crucifix, hence the chapel's name, is a 15th-century work, while the altar was designed by Ludovico Perini in 1719, commissioned by Bartolomeo Pellegrini. The baptismal font is made of red Verona marble.

===== Centrego Altar (7) =====
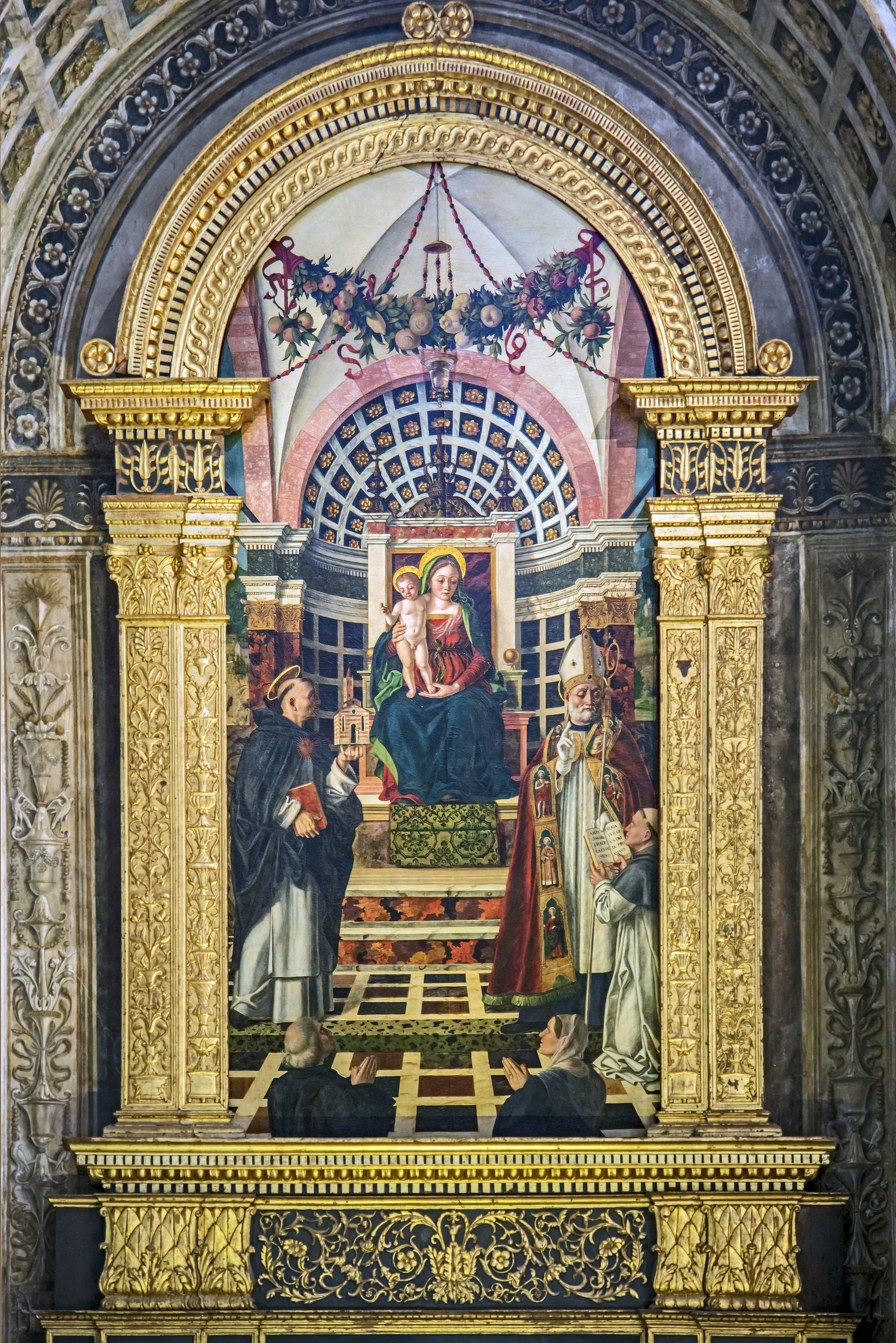
Centrego altar, with the altarpiece by Girolamo dai Libri.

The Centrego Altar (named after the family that commissioned it) was built between 1488 and 1502 in the Renaissance style, at the behest of Cosimo Centrego, as can be read from the inscription on the ark: "COSMAS CENTREGVS VIVES DICAVIT." Dedicated to St. Thomas Aquinas, it is located opposite the sacristy, on the right wall of the transept. To make it, part of the large central window of the transept had to be obstructed. It was probably built at the end of the 15th century, when the existing altar was enlarged. During the restorations of 1879-1881, the large window was partially reopened thanks to the demolition, as far as possible, of the wall that obstructed it above. The altarpiece, the Madonna with Child, St. Thomas Aquinas, St. Augustine and the donors Cosimo Centrego and Orsolina Cipolla, was painted in 1502 by the young Girolamo dai Libri. The altarpiece is set in a semicircular arch bordered by pairs of columns set on a pillar.

==== Left aisle ====
Listed below are the altars and chapels located on the left aisle, from the entrance to the apsidal area.

===== Boldieri Chapel (19) =====
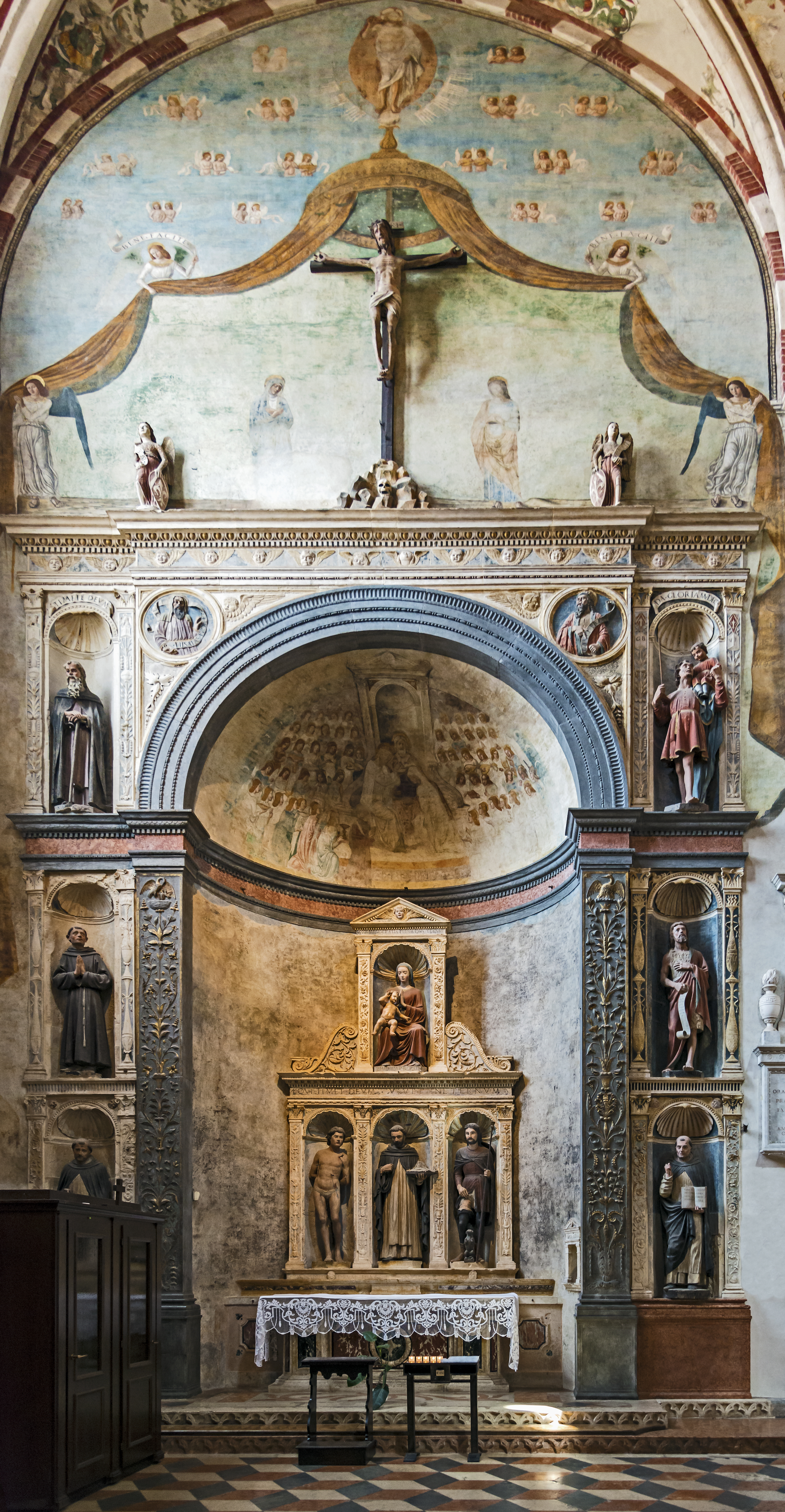
Boldieri Chapel

The Boldieri Chapel, also known as the "Altar of St. Peter the Martyr", dates back to the mid-15th century and is the first chapel encountered on the left side of the nave when entering from the main entrance. It was built at the behest of the nobleman Gerardo Boldieri, belonging to the Contrada of Santa Maria in Chiavica, who ordered that he be buried here. His ark was placed to the left of the altar. Below the cenotaph there is a plaque with an epigraph.

The chapel has a large niche surrounded by a triumphal arch and richly decorated pilasters. Inside the large niche there is an altar from the 17th century, surmounted by an altarpiece in two orders; in the lower one, from the left, there are the statues of St. Sebastian, St. Peter the Martyr and St. Roch, while in the upper one there is the Madonna with Child. On both sides of the pilasters there are six other niches (three on each side) with statues of saints: on the right, from below, St. Vincent, St. John the Baptist, St. Christopher, while on the left, St. Dominic, St. Francis and St. Anthony the Abbot. Above the chapel is an entablature decorated with a frieze on which are placed three other statues: on the sides are two angels holding a shield and in the center a wooden crucifix with Our Lady and St. John, this time drawn, on the sides, all surmounted by a baldachin, also painted. In the conch there is a fresco of the Coronation of the Virgin.

===== Faella Altar (18) =====
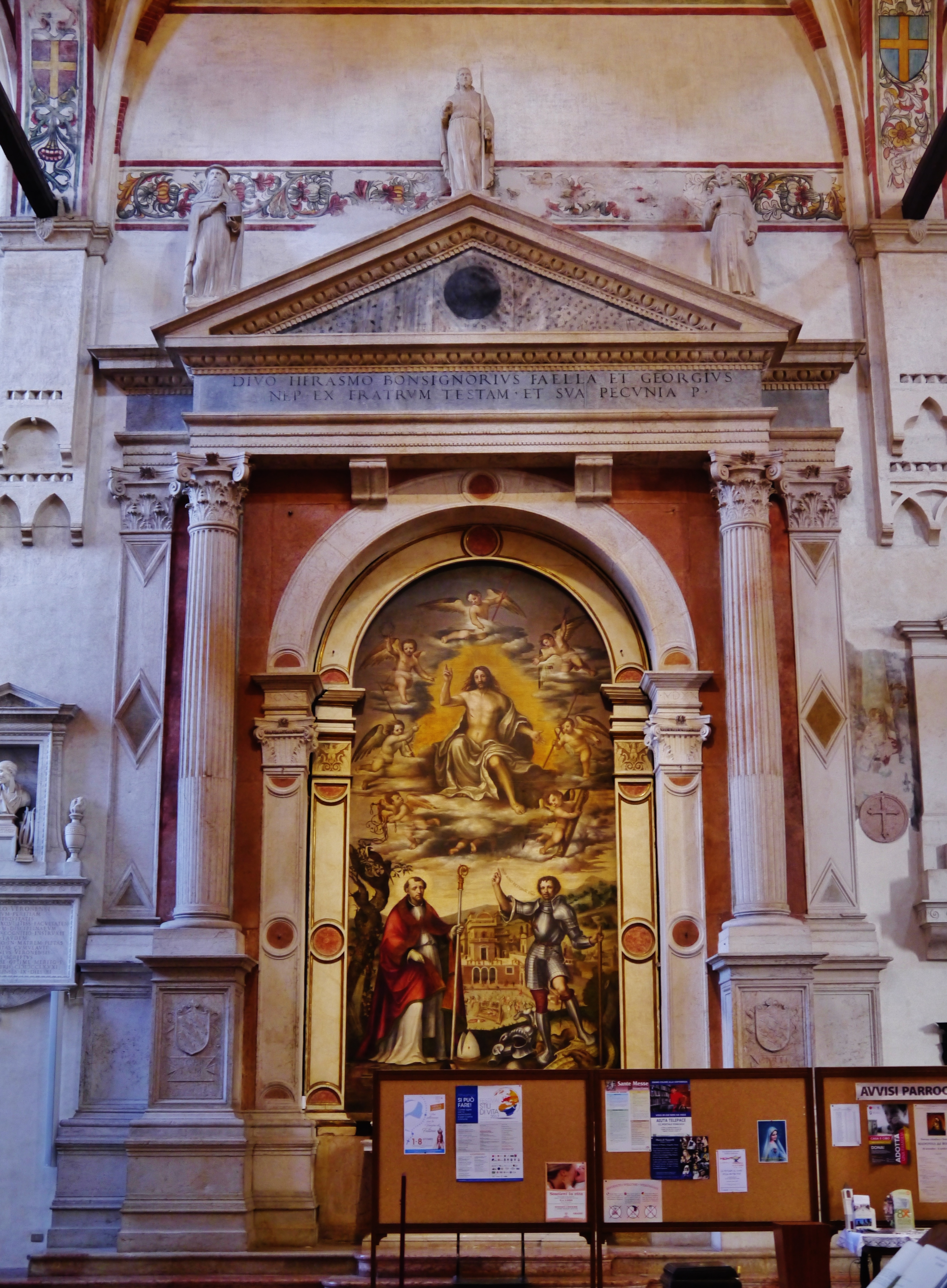
Faella Altar

Built in 1520 at the behest of Bonsignorio Faella, it was originally dedicated to St. George, while today the titular saint is Erasmus of Formia, a fourth-century Christian martyr. The material of construction is marble, mostly white, but with red and black inserts. On the architrave is carved in Roman characters the following inscription in two lines: "DIVO HERASMO BONSIGNORIUS FAELLA ET GEORGIVS || NEPOS EX FRATRVM TEST ET SVA PECVNIA P". On the friezes of the pillars (half on the left, half on the right) there is another inscription, from which it is possible to determine the year in which the altar was built: "AERE SVO MDXX. || BONSIGMORIVS". On the dados of the pedestals of the outer columns were carved the coats of arms of the noble Faella family, together with their own motto "incertum certius" ("nothing is more certain than the uncertain"). The remarkable altarpiece, painted by Nicolò Giolfino, depicts the Redeemer between Saints George and Erasmus, and on the wall is the tomb of Giuseppe Torelli, mathematician and man of letters from Verona, designed by Michelangelo Castellazzi and sculpted by Francesco Zoppi.

===== Altar of Saint Raymond of Penyafort (17) =====
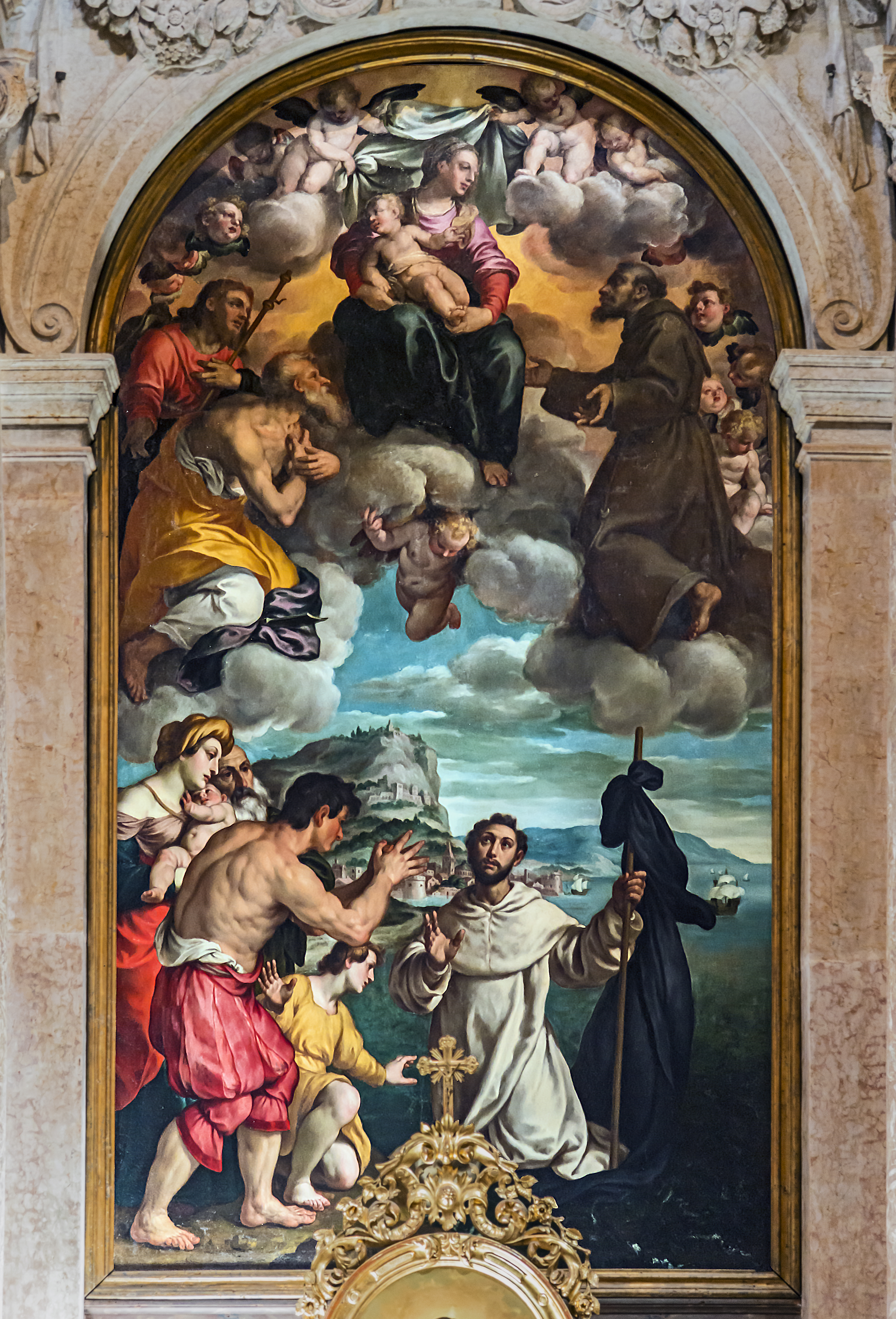
Altar of Saint Raymond of Penyafort.

The altar, formerly dedicated to St. Vincent of Saragossa, was later dedicated to St. Raymond of Penyafort, a Dominican saint. The altarpiece placed here was begun by Felice Brusasorzi and then completed by his pupil Alessandro Turchi; the two painters depicted the Virgin with Saints Philip, James, Francis and Raymond. To the right of the altar, in front of the Miniscalchi altar, is the tomb of the mathematician Pietro Cossali, designed by Giuseppe Barbieri and made by the sculptor Antonio Spazzi. On the left, also set into the wall, is the tomb of the Veronese physician Leonardo Targa, also sculpted by Antonio Spazzi and designed by Luigi Trezza.

===== Miniscalchi Chapel (16) =====
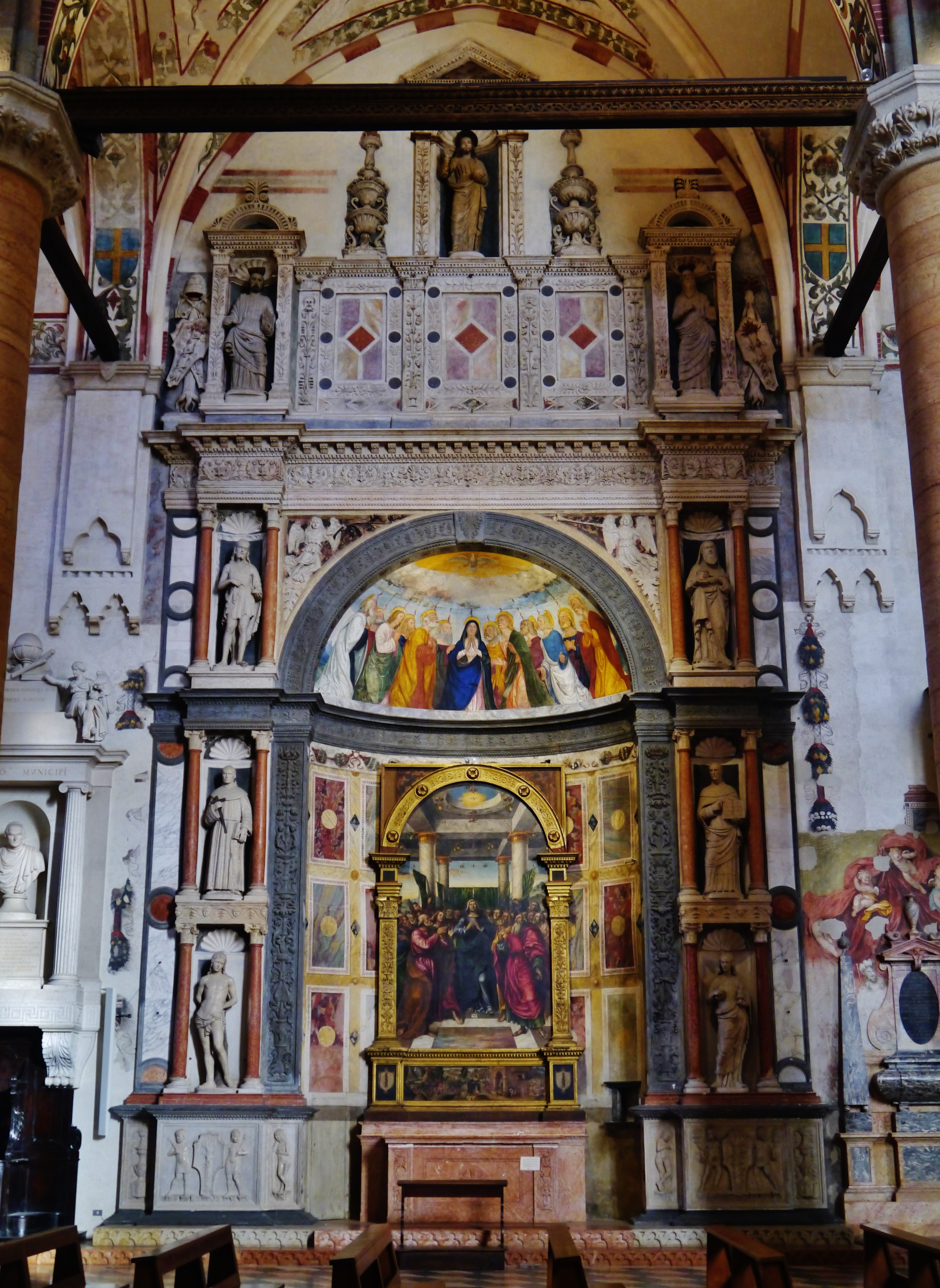
Miniscalchi Chapel

Also called the Chapel of the Holy Spirit, it belonged to the Miniscalchi family, originally from Lombardy, who came to Verona at the turn of the 14th and 15th centuries, during the Visconti's reign. The construction of the altar dates back to 1436, according to a design attributed to Pietro da Porlezza, while the material execution was carried out by a certain Mastro Agnolo; the historian Luigi Simeoni speaks of it as a "marvelous work of the Renaissance." The altarpiece, depicting the Descent of the Holy Spirit, is by Nicolò Giolfino, who signed and dated it in 1518. In the predella there is a painting of the Sermon of St. Vincent Ferrer, also by Giolfino, while the semi-dome, where a Pentecost is depicted, is the work of Francesco Morone with the help of Paolo Morando (the latter also known as "Il Cavazzola"). On the left is the tomb of Zanino Miniscalchi, (Note: Zanino Miniscalchi, in a will dated April 27, 1424, ordered to be buried "in uno monumento sito in claustro ecclesie Sancte Anastazie". In Cipolla (1916, p. 85).) progenitor of the Veronese branch of the family; the inscription is in Gothic characters and is placed under the family coat of arms.

On the sides, between small columns with Corinthian capitals, are six niches (three on each side), each containing a statue of Saint Sebastian, Saint Francis, Saint John the Baptist, Saint Jerome, Saint Vincent Ferrer, and Saint John the Evangelist. Above, two side aedicules house statues of Saints Peter and Paul, while in the central gabled one is a blessing Christ. Before the floor was built, there was a chapel dedicated to the Holy Trinity. In the Liber Possessionum (Note: Year 1420. Preserved in the archives of St. Anastasia, fol. 147.) there is a record of a donation made "pro dote altaris Trinitatis".

===== Chapel of the Rosary (14) =====
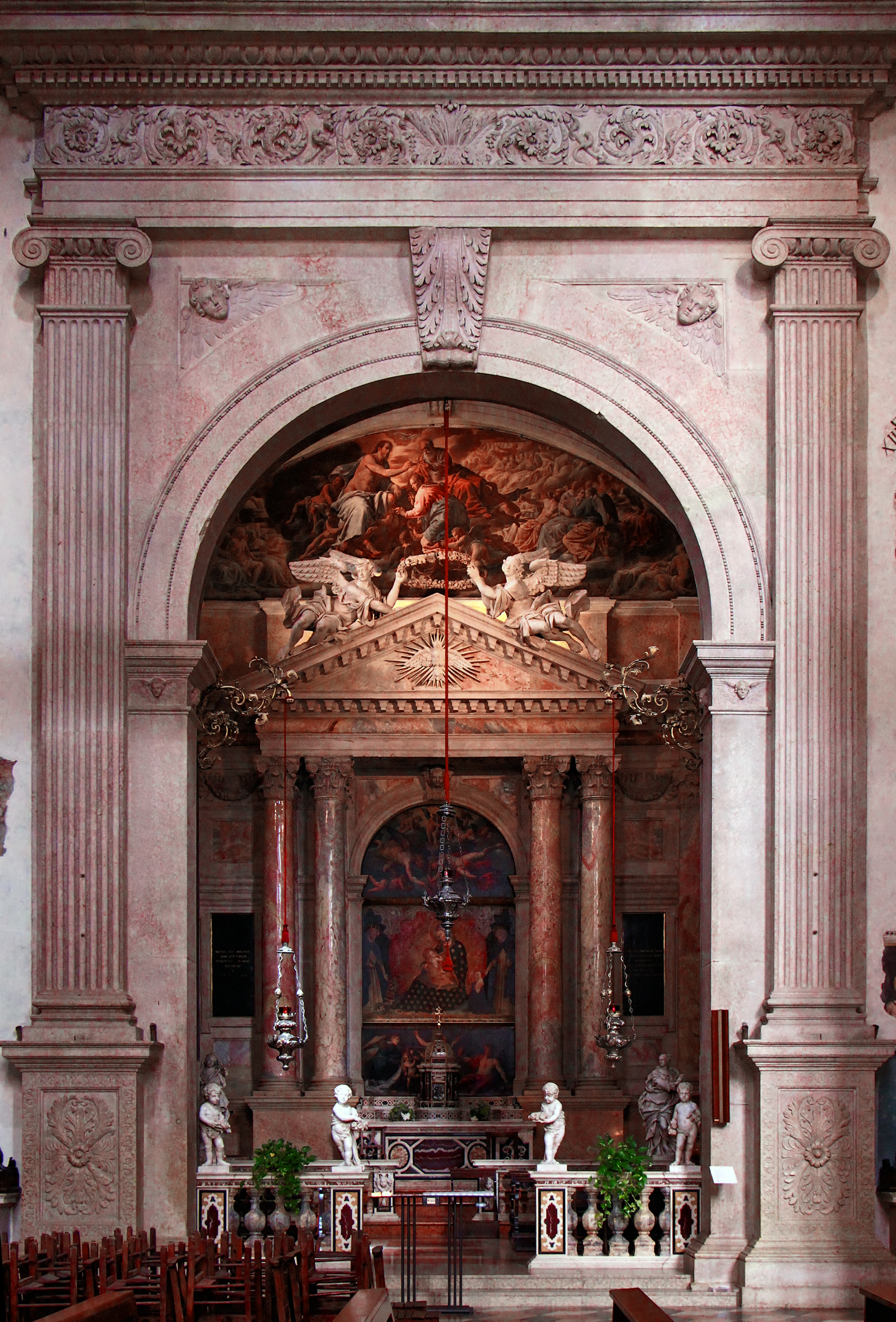
Chapel of the Rosary

The Chapel of the Rosary was rebuilt starting in 1585 to celebrate the victory of Lepanto in 1571, in which the city of Verona had participated with three companies of soldiers. The name derives from the foundation of the "Society of the Rosary", a congregation created for the very purpose of honoring the victory, which undertook to build the chapel. According to the inscription on the inner façade of the doorway, the work on the chapel was completed in 1596 as far as the walls were concerned, (Note: It reads: «DEIPARAE VIRGINI SACELLY || PRIORV ELEEMOSINIS || ERECTV SANCT. ROSARII || CONFRATERNITAS DICAVIT || ANN. DNI CIƆ IƆ XCVI». In Cipolla (1916, p. 82).) while the completion of the marble covering had to wait until 1607. The project is attributed to the architect Domenico Curtoni, nephew and pupil of the Veronese architect Michele Sanmicheli, who conceived the work in the typical style of the 16th century with some Baroque additions, although the intervention of other designers has been proposed. The entrance to the chapel is through an Ionic arch with a frieze covered with spirals.

The altarpiece above the altar depicts Our Lady of Humility with Saints Peter the Martyr and Dominic and the Offerers. The painting is unanimously attributed by critics of the second half of the twentieth century to Lorenzo Veneziano, a painter active in Verona in the second half of the fourteenth century. The Virgin in the center probably represents the first example of the diffusion of this subject also in Venetian lands, here depicted not in the more modest and "domestic" version typical of its introducer Simone Martini and his followers, but in that of the "majestic woman" first experimented by Bartolomeo da Camogli: although lactans and seated on the ground, she actually appears surrounded by angels in gilded monochrome, standing out against the red background. While the two saints are easily identifiable from the juxtaposed inscriptions and their attributes, the two donors are traditionally considered to be two reigning Scaliger spouses; depending on the interpretation, they could be identified as Mastino II della Scala and Taddea da Carrara, or Cangrande II della Scala and his wife Elizabeth of Bavaria. Composed in imitation of a triptych, it was probably originally leaned against the demolished choir screen of the church. Along the four edges there is a Marian invocation framed by a faux denticulated molding, the latter partially sacrificed by the folds of the canvas to fit the new altar. Previously thought to be a detached fresco and restored on canvas, the 2003 restoration confirmed that it was originally painted in tempera on linen, an extremely rare example of this technique in the 14th century.

On the left wall of the chapel is an oil on canvas from the first half of the 17th century depicting Christ Praying in the Garden by Pietro Bernardi. On the right wall is The Flagellation of Christ, painted in 1619 by Claudio Ridolfi. The altar is made up of two groups formed by four composite columns, on which a tabernacle is placed. The lunette of the altar is decorated with the Coronation of the Virgin by Marcantonio Vassetti. On the pendentives, Giovan Battista Rossi created the Deposition in the 18th century, while the Annunciation and the Adoration of the Shepherds are attributed to Dario Pozzo and Biagio Falcieri, respectively. The dome is decorated with paintings by Marcantonio Bassetti depicting the Assumption and the Trinity. On either side of the altar are two marble statues by Gabriele Brunelli, Faith and Prayer (left and right, respectively). On the inner balustrade, made between 1627 and 1634, are four statues representing angels, carved by Pietro da Carniola.

===== Giusti Chapel and sacristy (13) =====
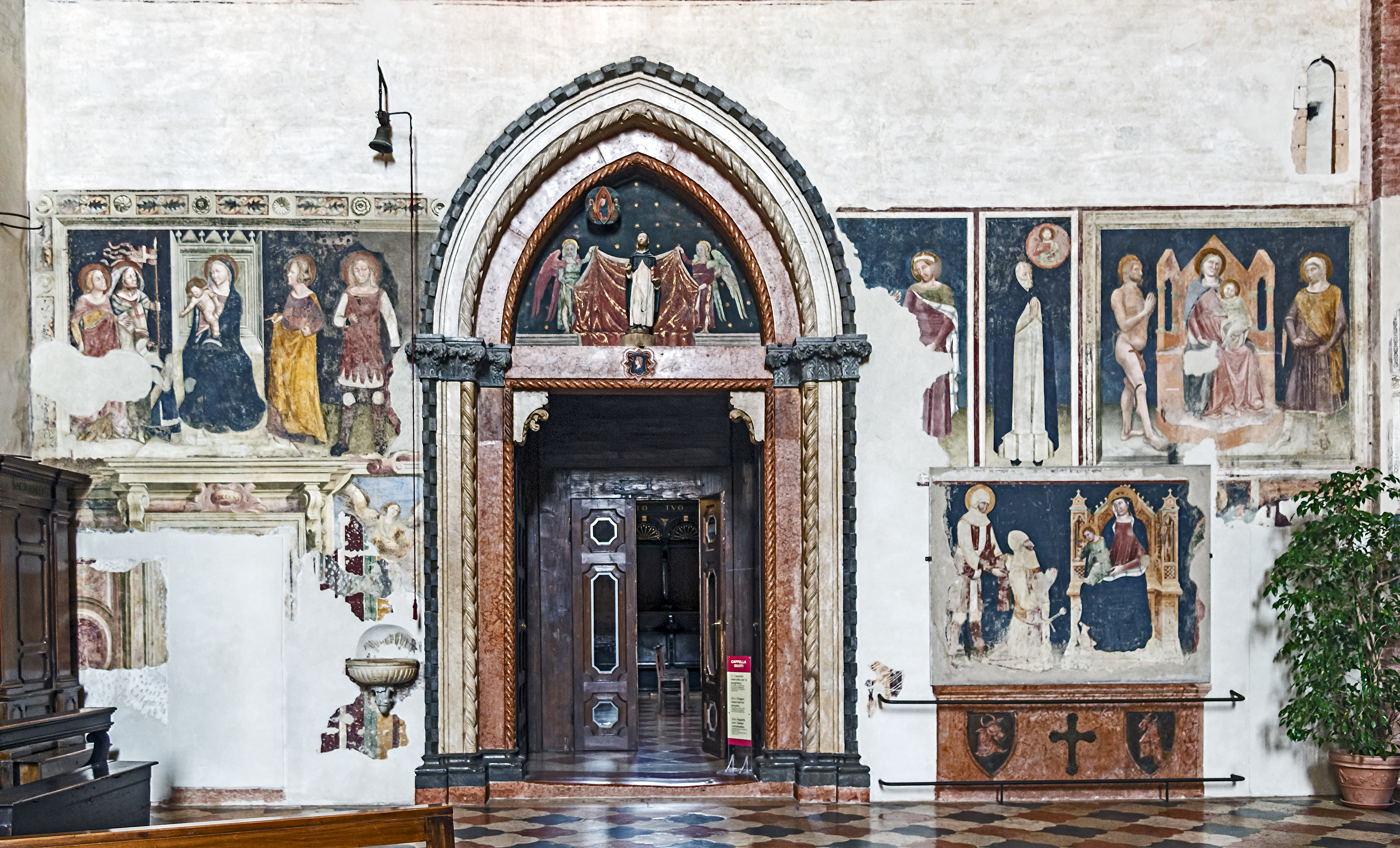
Entrance to the sacristy and the Giusti Chapel. On the side there are frescoes attributed to Boninsegna.

On the left wall of the transept is the door to the sacristy, built in 1453 by the Giusti family to house their funerary chapel, which was placed at the back of the room. Before entering it, on the wall inside the church, one can see frescoes attributed to Boninsegna and three canvases depicting St. Cecilia, the Miracle of St. Hyacinth and the Deposition and St. Paul, St. Dionysius, Magdalene and devotees by Turchi, Farinati and Morone, respectively. After passing through the door, above it is an inscription in Roman characters commemorating the building of the sacristy. (Note: The inscription reads: «DEO MAGNO PROPITIO || SACRARIVM HOC A SOLO AEDIFICATVM || ARAM DIVO VINCENTIO ORATORI SVO || SEPVLCHRA IVSTORVUM OSSIBVS CINE || RIBVSQVE NOBILIS OPTIMI AC APPRIME || FORTVNATI CIVIS PROVALI IVSTI SENI || ORIS LIBERI NEPOTESQVE BONORVM GRATI || SUCCESSORES AERE PROPRIO CONSECRA || RVNT ANNO AD HVMANATIONE CHRISTI || M. CCCC LIII». In Cipolla (1916, p. 64)) Also on the door is a large painting depicting the Council of Trent by Biagio Falcieri, a 17th-century painter.

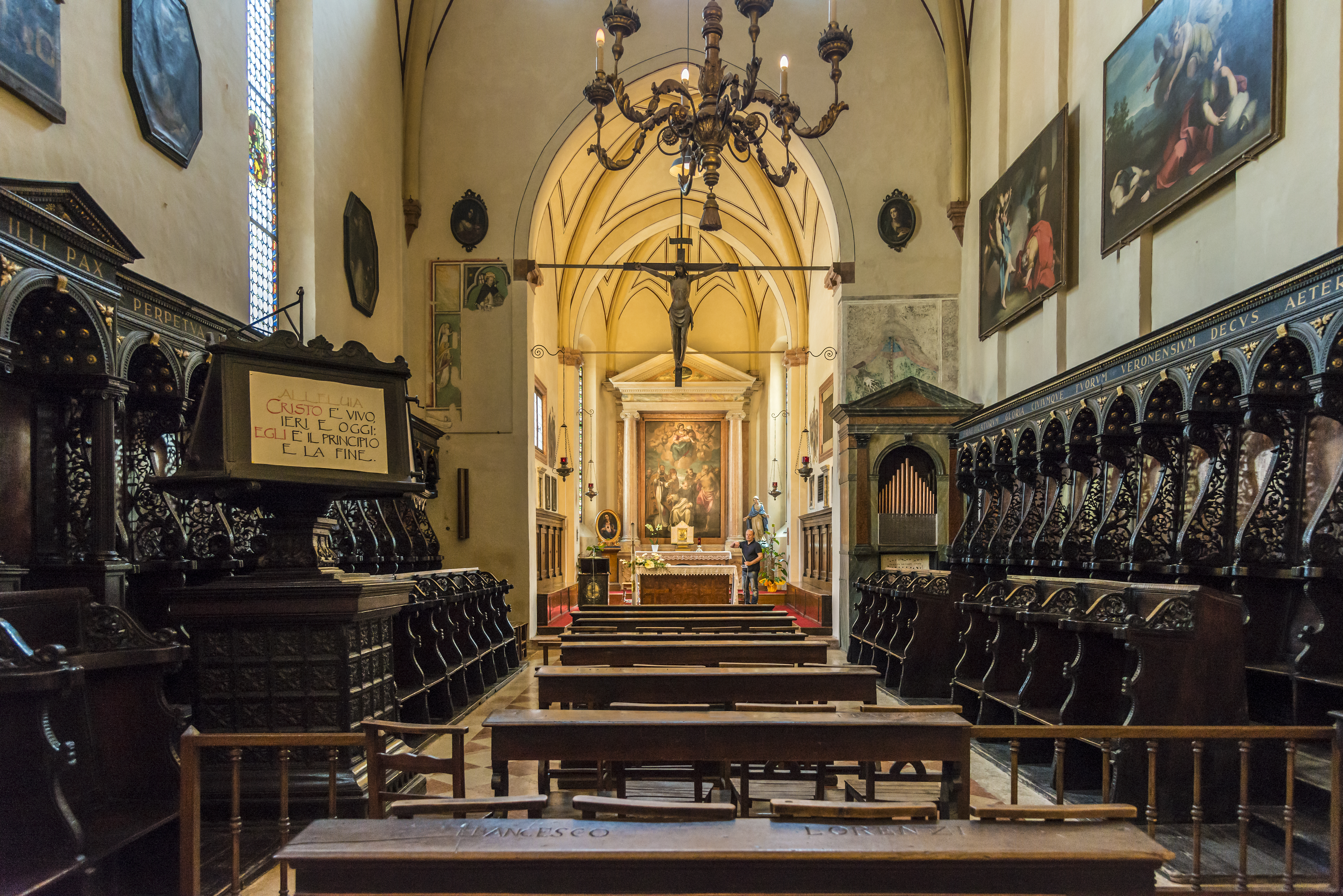
The sacristy and, at the back, the Giusti Chapel

The chapel and the altar were renovated after more than a century and a half, in 1598, so that nothing remains of the original appearance, but it is known, thanks to the testament of Roberto Giusti of July 15, 1644, (Note: In which he ordered to be buried "in monumento illorum de Iustis in cappela nova sancti Vencentii illorum de Iustis, sive in sacristia nova ecclesie sancte Anastasie Verone". In Cipolla (1916, p. 66).) that the titular saint was Saint Vincent Ferrer from the beginning. On the frontispiece of the altar there is a brief dedicatory inscription: "DEO || B. MARIÆ VIR || AC VINCENTIO". A large plaque on the wall to the right of the entrance commemorates the reconstruction of 1598. The altarpiece was made by Felice Brusasorzi and depicts several saints with the Virgin and St. Vincent. On the floor, in the center of the chapel, is a triple tomb from the sixteenth century, in which each of the three stones is adorned with the Giusti family coat of arms, which also appears, painted or carved, in many other places in the sacristy. In the center of the sacristy there is another tomb dating back to 1793. The two large stained glass windows, still well preserved thanks to a restoration in 1969, are of great value, being dated around 1460, making them the oldest found in Verona, characterized by the colors white, green and red, with simple ornamentation and without figures.

== See also ==
- Monuments of Verona
- Churches of Verona
- Roman Catholic Diocese of Verona
- Pellegrini Chapel (Santa Anastasia)

== Bibliography ==
- Benini, Gianfranco (1988). Le chiese di Verona: guida storico-artistica [The churches of Verona: a historical-artistic guide] (in Italian). Arte e natura libri.
- "Basilica di Santa Anastasia". BeWeB.
- Borelli, Giorgio (1980). Chiese e monasteri di Verona [Churches and monasteries in Verona] (in Italian). Verona: Banca Popolare di Verona.
- Cappelletti, Giovanni (1970). La Basilica di S. Anastasia [The Basilica of St. Anastasia] (in Italian). Verona: Edizioni di Vita Veronese. BNI 828558.
- Carregari, Mario; Carrara, Remigio; et al. (1976). Due secoli di attività della Società Campanaria di Santa Anastasia [Two centuries of activity of the Società Campanaria di Santa Anastasia] (in Italian). Verona: Novastampa di Verona.
- Castagnetti, Andrea; Varanini, Gian Maria (1991). Il Veneto nel medioevo: dai comuni cittadini al predominio scaligero nella Marca [Veneto in the Middle Ages: from the communes to the dominance of the Scaligeri in the March] (in Italian). Banca Popolare di Verona.
- Cipolla, Carlo (1916). Ricerche storiche intorno alla chiesa di Santa Anastasia in Verona [Historical research around the church of St. Anastasia in Verona] (in Italian).
- Conforti, Giuseppe (1998). "L'arca funeraria e la statua equestre di Cortesia Serego in Sant'Anastasia a Verona. Indagine storico-iconologica" [The funerary ark and equestrian statue of Cortesia Serego in Sant'Anastasia in Verona. Historical-iconological survey]. Arte Documento: Rivista di Storia e tutela dei Beni Culturali (in Italian) (12): 216–226.
- Cuppini, Maria Teresa (1970). Pitture murali restaurate [Restored wall paintings] (in Italian). Ministero della Pubblica Istruzione.
- Eberhardt, Hans-Joachim (1974). Brugnoli, Pierpaolo (ed.). Maestri della pittura veronese [Masters of Veronese painting] (in Italian). Banca Mutua Popolare di Verona.
- Giardini, Caterina (1999). Santa Anastasia - storia e guida della Chiesa di Sant'Anastasia in Verona [St. Anastasia - history and guide to the Church of St. Anastasia in Verona] (in Italian). Verona: Associazione Chiese Vive.
- Girardi, Enrico (1968). Gli organi della città di Verona [The organs of the city of Verona] (in Italian). Alba: Edizioni Paoline.
- Marchini, Gian Paolo (1982). Santa Anastasia [St. Anastasia] (in Italian). Verona: Banca Popolare di Verona.
- Marini, Paola; Campanella, Christian (2011). La Basilica di Santa Anastasia a Verona. Storia e restauro [The Basilica of Saint Anastasia in Verona. History and restoration] (in Italian). Banco Popolare. ISBN 978-88-90645-40-2.
- Scapini, Arturo (1954). La chiesa di santa Anastasia [The church of St. Anastasia] (in Italian). Verona: Edizioni di Vita Veronse.
- Simeoni, Luigi (1929). Verona (in Italian). Roma: Tiber.
- Viviani, Giuseppe Franco (2004). Chiese nel veronese [Churches in the Verona area] (in Italian). Verona: Società cattolica di assicurazione.
