= Francesco Morone =

Italian painter

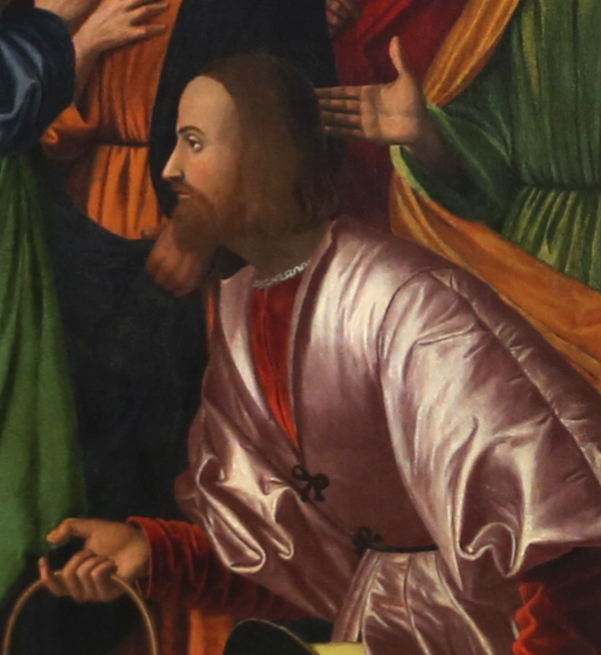
Presumed self-portrait of Francesco Morone. (Note: It is Giorgio Vasari, in his Lives of the Most Excellent Painters, Sculptors, and Architects, who recounts that Francesco Morone portrayed himself in the young man in the foreground carrying water to Christ: «he painted in another work, which is above that of Carota, the Lord washing the feet of the Apostles, who are shown in various attitudes; in this work they say the painter portrayed himself as the figure serving Christ by carrying the water». In Catalogo Museo di Castelvecchio, 2018, p. 272 and Vasari 1568, p. 264.) Detail of the Washing of the Feet, first half of the 1510s, Castelvecchio Museum, Verona

Francesco Morone (1471 – 16 May 1529) was an Italian painter, active in his native city of Verona in a Renaissance style.

He learned the art of painting in his father Domenico Morone's workshop, where he met Girolamo dai Libri, with whom he formed a lasting friendship and collaborated on several occasions. After working for a long time as his father's assistant, in 1498 he signed his first independent work: a Crucifixion for the Avanzi Chapel of the Church of San Bernardino in his native city. This first work marked the beginning of his artistic separation from his father's figure, a process of emancipation that was completed around 1502–1504 with the creation of the canvas Madonna enthroned with Child between Saints Zeno and Nicholas, considered one of his finest works. His successful period continued with the fresco decoration of the sacristy of the Church of Santa Maria in Organo in Verona, unanimously regarded as among his masterpieces.

Around 1517 he signed the Stigmata of Saint Francis. also a canvas of fine workmanship=In his later works, one can discern the influence of his pupil Paolo Morando, who in the meantime had surpassed his master in adapting to new stylistic trends. In the last years of his life, he drew even closer to religion, which probably influenced his artistic production, thereafter characterized by "sweet and melancholy Madonnas". He died in 1529 and his remains were placed in San Bernardino, where many of his most important works are still preserved.

== Biography ==
=== Birth and training ===
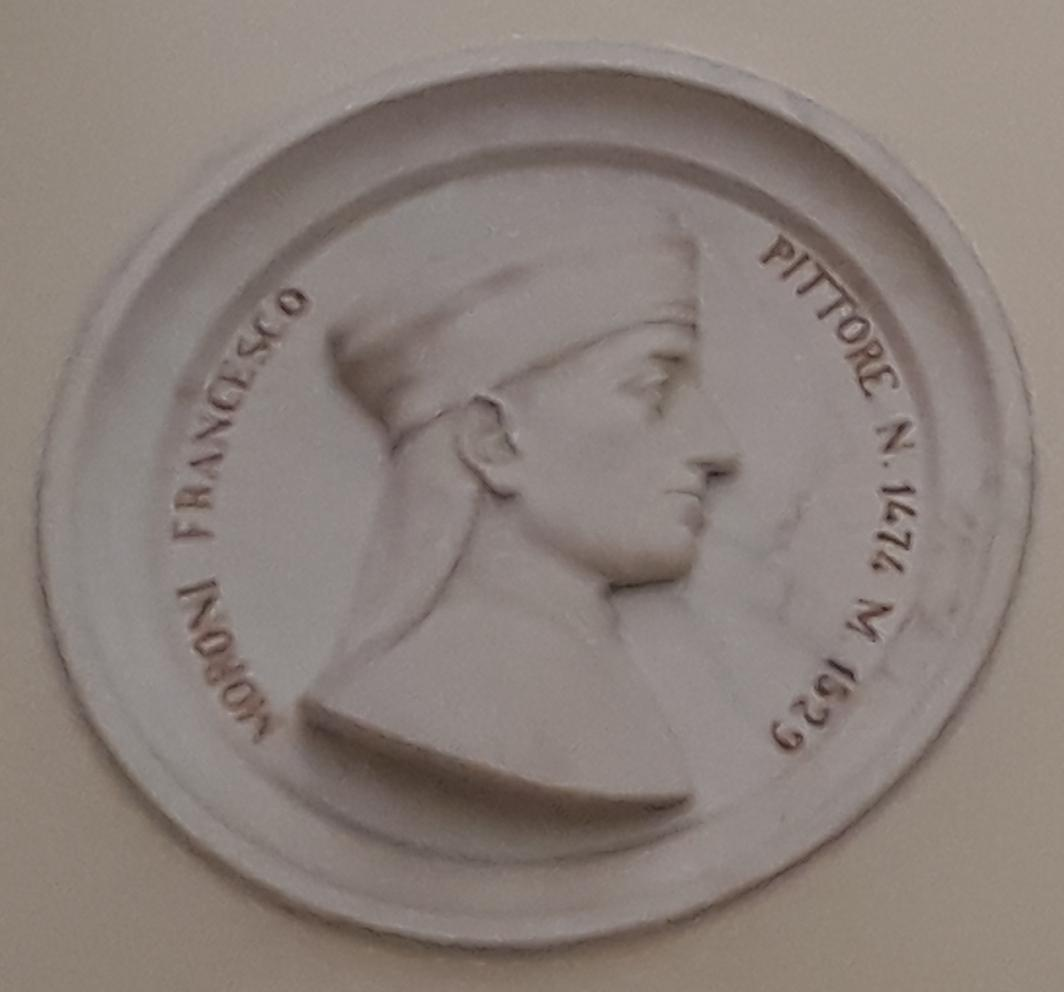
Effigy of Francesco Morone at the Protomoteca of the Biblioteca civica di Verona

Francesco Morone was born around 1471 in the district of San Vitale in Verona, the third of seven children of Cecilia and Domenico, himself also a renowned painter. He learned the art of painting in his father's workshop, together with his younger brother Antonio (born around 1474), and collaborated for a long time with his father on various commissions. From the documents in our possession, we know that he continued to live in San Vitale even after marrying Lucia and having some children with her, always working in the Veronese territory.

From his father Domenico he inherited the influences of Mantuan Mantegnism, though he was able to broaden his artistic horizons when he came into contact with the trends of the Venetian environment. He probably stayed in the lagoon, where he encountered the Venetian school of Vittore Carpaccio, Bartolomeo Montagna, Cima da Conegliano, Giovanni Bellini, and Antonello da Messina. The influence of these artists is evident in Francesco's works, which are distinguished by a different approach compared to his father, who remained faithful to the Mantegna school.

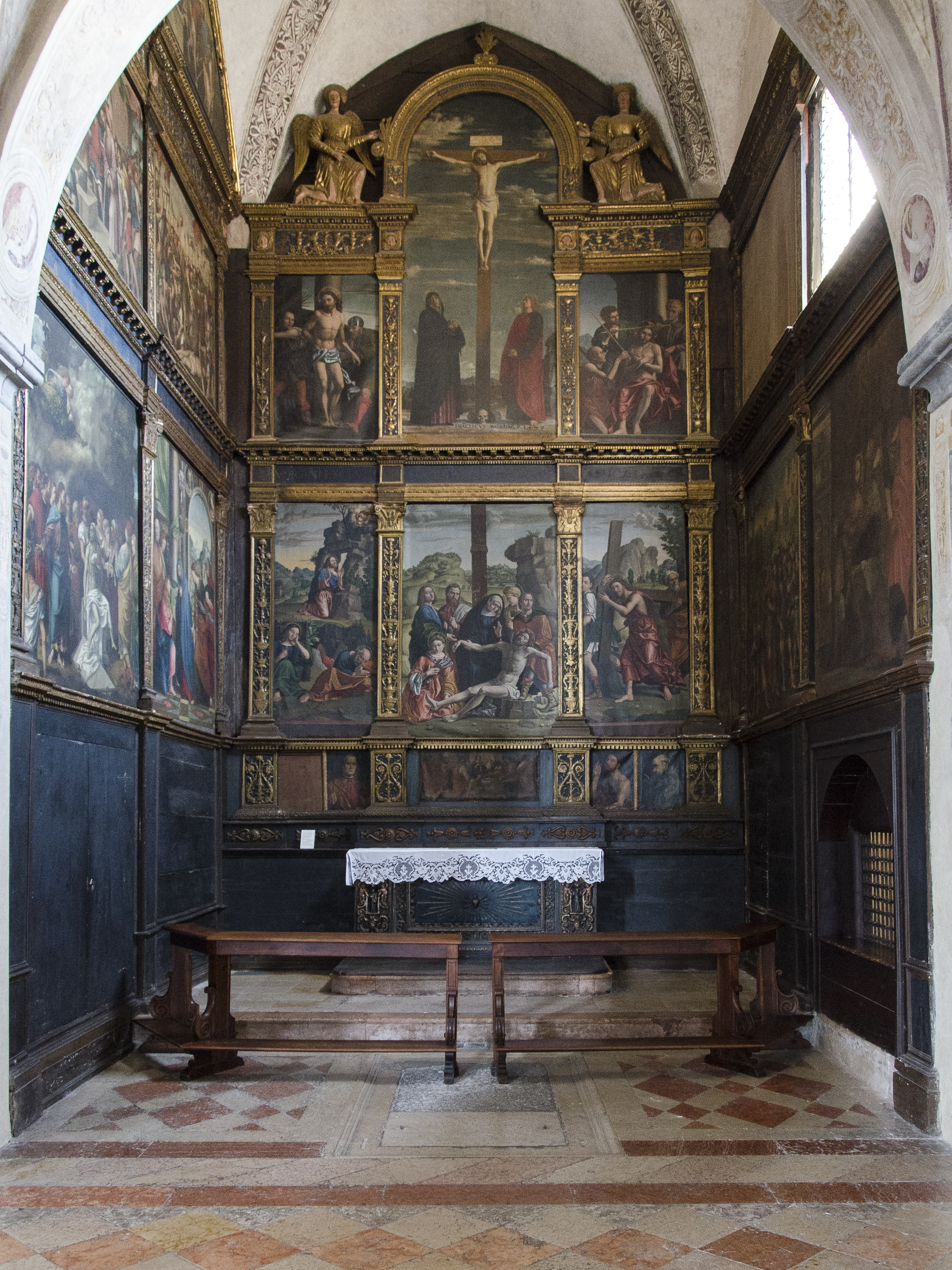
The Avanzi Chapel in the Church of San Bernardino in Verona, a masterpiece of father and son Morone. The Crucifixion at the top center is by Francesco

His debut in painting took place on 16 April 1496, when he and his father signed and dated the altarpiece Virgin enthroned with Child and four Saints for the Sanctuary of the Madonna delle Grazie in Arco. In 1498 he worked alongside Domenico and Giovanni Maria Falconetto on the fresco decoration of the Chapel of Saint Blaise in the Church of Santi Nazaro e Celso in Verona. In the same year, again in collaboration with his father, he worked on the decoration of the Avanzi Chapel (also called the Chapel of the Cross) in the Church of San Bernardino, where he finally signed his first known independent work: a Crucifixion placed above the altar. Critical opinion on this work has always been divided: while Adolfo Venturi, in his Storia dell'arte italiana, still considered it "dominated by his father's art and inconsistent in form", Bernard Berenson took quite the opposite view, highlighting "the cross terribly looming on the horizon, the solid figures". In 1502 he returned to collaborate with his father on the creation of a cycle of frescoes for the Church of San Nicola da Tolentino at Paladon in San Pietro in Cariano, now detached and housed in the Castelvecchio Museum in Verona. The following year his father completed what is considered his masterpiece: the frescoes of the Sagramoso Library in the convent of San Bernardino, to which Francesco himself must have made a significant contribution.

=== Maturity ===
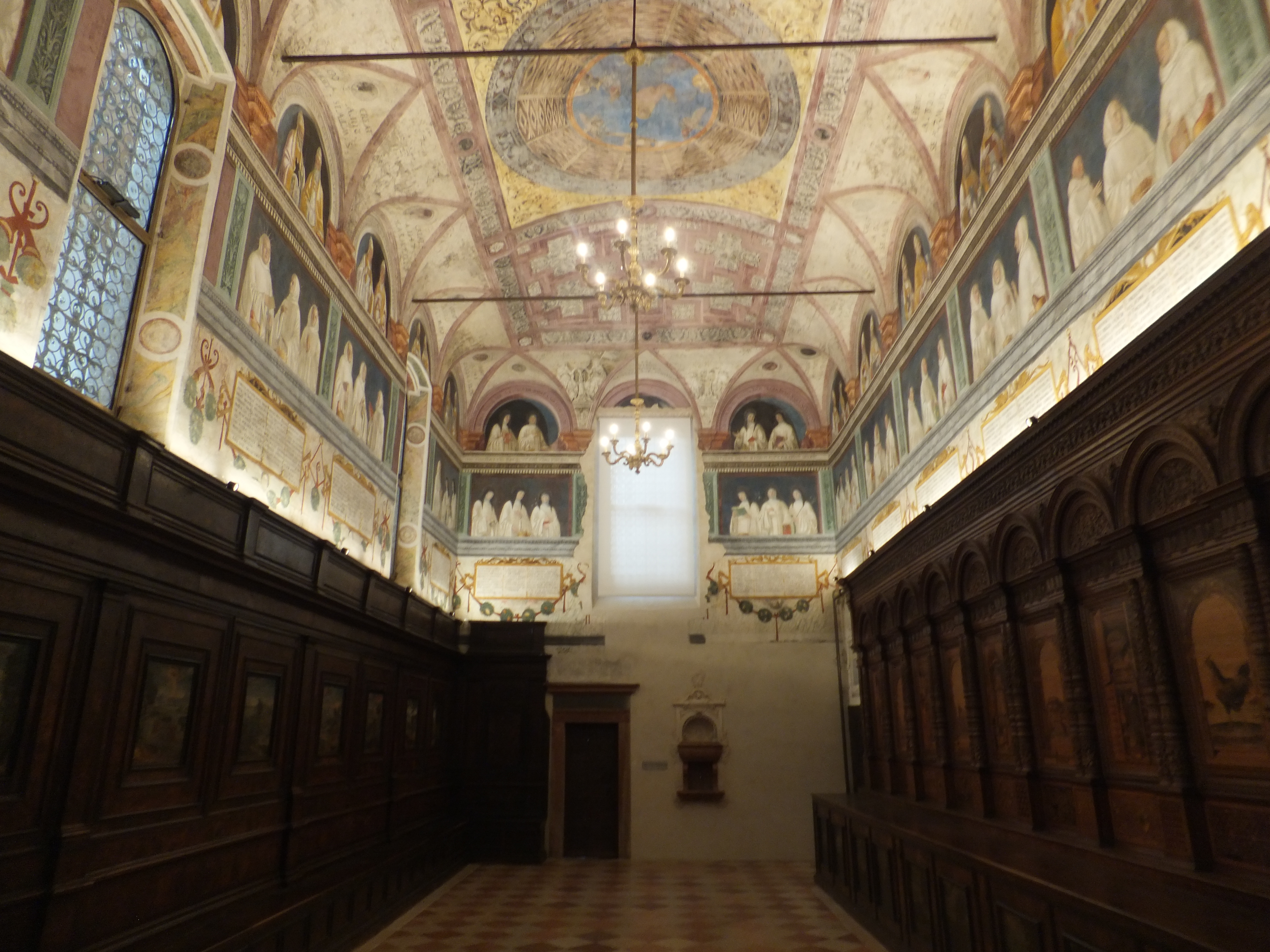
The frescoes by Francesco Morone in the sacristy of the Church of Santa Maria in Organo

Between 1505 and 1507 Francesco Morone, assisted by some collaborators, executed the frescoes in the sacristy of the Church of Santa Maria in Organo in Verona, unanimously considered among his masterpieces, so much so that Vasari described it as "the most beautiful... that there was in all Italy". In the upper part of the wall he painted portraits of popes and other illustrious figures linked to the Benedictine order, including some doges of the Republic of Venice. Vasari praised and minutely described the pictorial cycle, suggesting that he had the opportunity to admire it in person. The work has been appreciated by numerous art historians, among them Jacob Burckhardt who, in the 19th century, was still able to underline "the beauty of the Saviour surrounded by angels in glory frescoed on the ceiling" of Mantegna-inspired derivation, today almost illegible.

In the same years Francesco welcomed as a pupil Paolo Morando, nicknamed Cavazzola. Together, in 1509, they worked as "compagni depentori" on the fresco of the Pentecost for the conch of the Miniscalchi chapel in the Basilica of Sant'Anastasia. According to the analysis of Luciano Cuppini, in this work Francesco's hand is especially evident in "the alabaster-like luminosity of the Virgin and some of the Apostles, the reflection of the dazzling light of the sky brightened by the Holy Spirit". Cavazzola's apprenticeship did not last long, since he soon emancipated himself from his master, developing a personal style which, in turn, influenced Francesco himself.

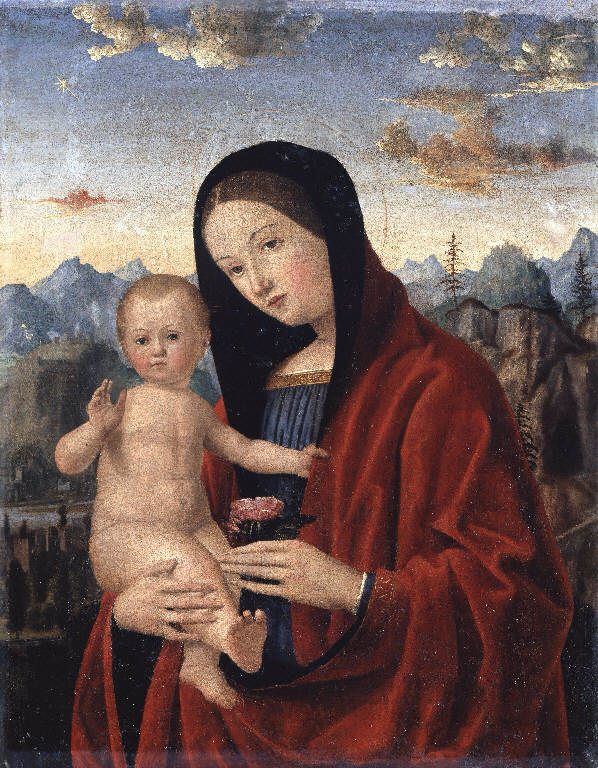
Madonna and Child, Accademia Carrara, Bergamo

In 1508 he collaborated with the painter Michele da Verona for the frescoed façade of the chapel of the Madonna in the Church of Santa Chiara in Verona. To Francesco are attributed the figures of God the Father, Saint Matthew, Saint Mark and Joshua on the external façade, and Christ in the roundel on the internal vault. The following year he painted a Madonna and Child, now preserved in the Accademia Carrara in Bergamo.

Between 1510 and 1513 he was engaged, with his assistants, in the execution of votive panels with frescoed saints in the chancel of the Church of Santi Giovanni e Marziale in Breonio, although the attribution is not entirely certain: on the left wall Saints Roch, Christopher and Sebastian (May 1513), Saint Martial (12 May 1513, commissioned by a certain Dorotea, wife of Francesco De Ioanegrando), Saint John the Baptist (1513, offered by Francesco Marchioris de Bonatis); on the right wall only the panel with Saint Agapitus survives (10 May 1510, commissioned by a certain Battista quondam Giovanni Graziadei).

Around the same years he may have painted the so-called Madonna Moscardo in which, in the clearly northern-style background landscape, the artist reproduces on the left Albrecht Dürer’s engraving Sea Monster. This represents the only known literary quotation of the German master in Francesco Morone's oeuvre, whereas it recurs frequently in the works of his friend Girolamo dai Libri.

From the Olivetan monks of Santa Maria in Organo, in 1515 Francesco Morone also received the commission to decorate the doors of the ancient organ, in collaboration with the painter and miniaturist Girolamo dai Libri. Vasari recounts the long friendship already linking the two artists, probably both trained in Domenico Morone's workshop=The contract signed on 12 November 1515 between Abbot Cipriani and the two artists stipulated that the two doors should appear "beautiful and praised by those who understand the art", reflecting the monks' desire to embellish their church after the tragic events of the War of the League of Cambrai which had shaken Verona.

The attribution of individual contributions in the work is debated: Vasari assigns to Francesco the realization of Saint Benedict and Saint John the Evangelist, while to Girolamo the flowers and the background; (Note: On the attribution of the organ doors, Giorgio Vasari states that "Girolamo also painted in Santa Maria in Organi, where he did his first work, on one of the organ doors (the other being painted by his companion Francesco Morone), two Saints on the outside, and inside a Nativity". In.) art historian Carlo Del Bravo has substantially proposed the opposite. Others still suppose that each artist painted one door. Contemporary criticism tends not to distinguish sharply between their contributions, supporting instead that both, bound by deep friendship, worked on the doors in perfect harmony, dividing the task equally and influencing each other. The work was completed in 1516 and placed in a chapel built by the Olivetans specifically to house the instrument. Later, probably on the occasion of the Baroque renovation of the organ, the doors passed to the Dal Pozzo family until, at the beginning of the 19th century, Count Bartolomeo donated them to the parish church of Marcellise (today in the municipality of San Martino Buon Albergo), where they still remain.

The collaboration between the two and Santa Maria in Organo must have continued with other works, however now lost.

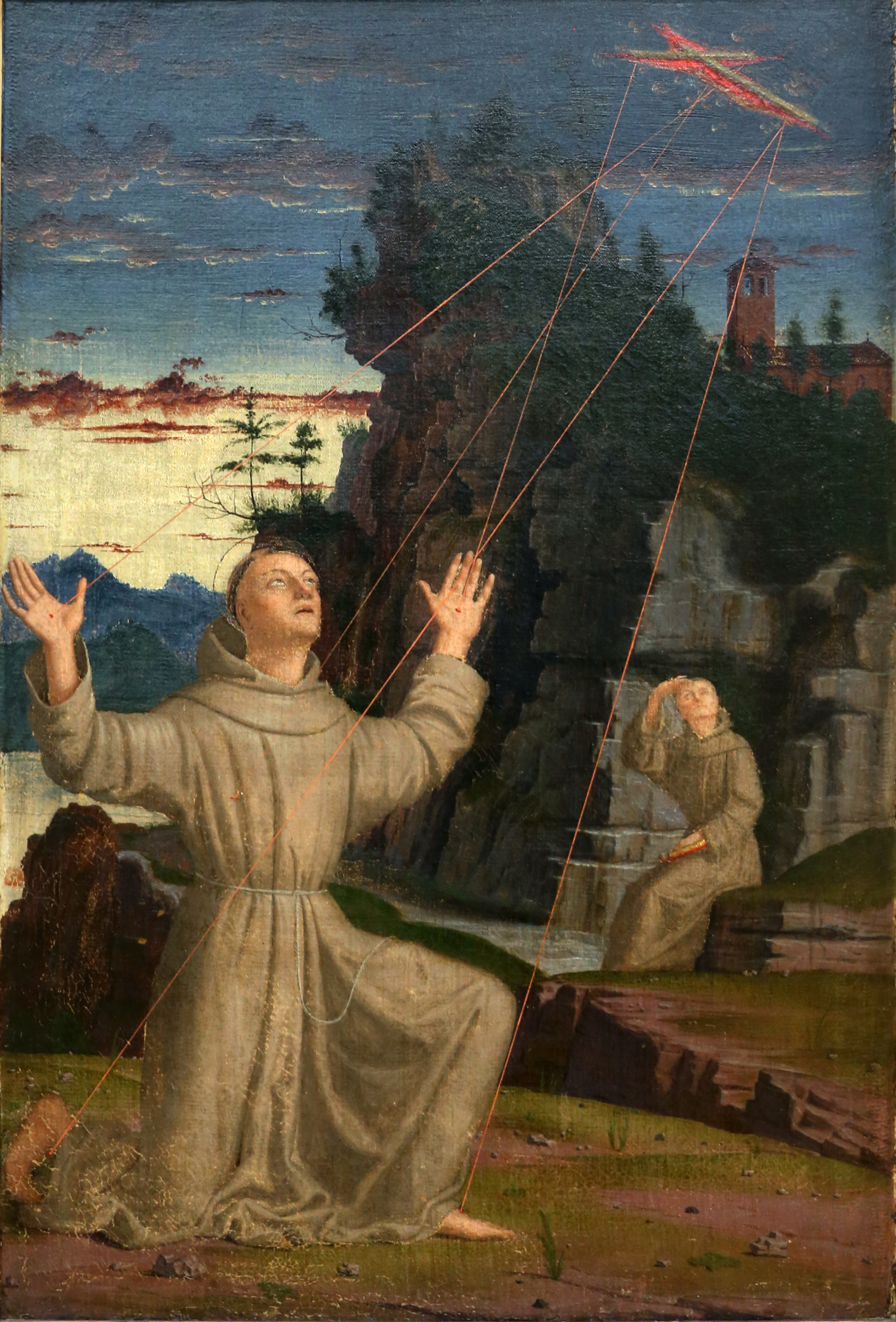
Stigmata of Saint Francis, Castelvecchio Museum, Verona

In 1515 he also signed the fresco Madonna and Child enthroned with Saints Joseph, Jerome, Anthony the Abbot and Roch, now kept in the Castelvecchio Museum, which has received praise from numerous authors, including Diego Zannandreis and Jacob Burckhardt. In it are found all the characteristic elements of Morone's mature production, namely "the love of symmetry, compositional eurhythmy, hieratic and solemn staticity" with forms that "expand compared to the youthful works but without becoming monumental".

Probably around 1517 Francesco, "shaken" by the "brilliant and pathetic colours" expressed by his pupil Paolo Morando and mindful of Carpaccio's lesson, painted the canvas |Stigmata of Saint Francis (although some place it in the youthful phase), also today in Castelvecchio and considered among his best works. As Del Bravo points out, it juxtaposes "the auras in the sea and the blood-red of the sky" with "the subtle theorem of mystical rays" in a spirit that almost recalls the style of Vincenzo Foppa.

Also dated to 1517 is a fresco depicting Madonna and Child with Saint Roch, painted for a house in Cazzano di Tramigna and later detached and placed in the Gallerie dell'Accademia in Venice. A Sacra Conversazione painted in 1520 is exhibited at the Accademia Carrara in Bergamo.

=== Last years ===
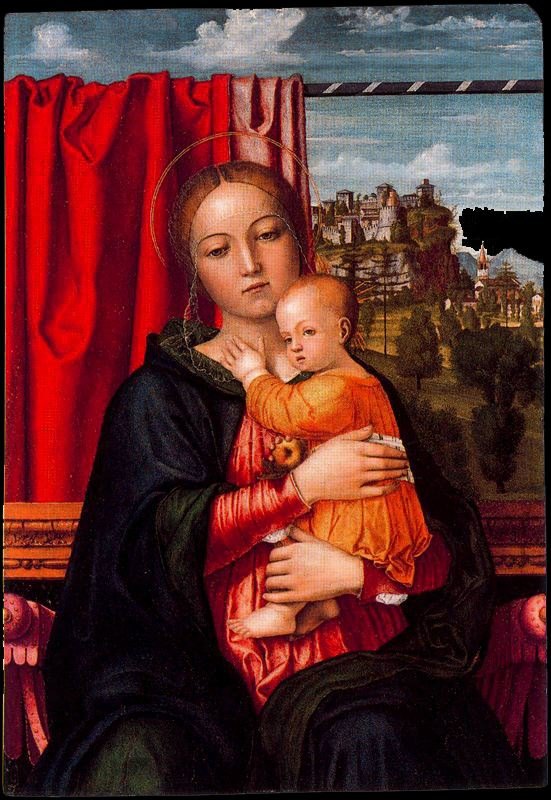
Madonna and Child, National Gallery, London

The late production of Francesco continued to be deeply influenced by his former pupil Paolo Morando. After the premature death of the latter in 1522, Morone turned his gaze to the art of his friend dai Libri, which in the meantime had been enriched with the vaguely Leonardesque suggestions of Francesco Bonsignori, disseminated in Verona by Giovan Francesco Caroto. In 1521 Francesco joined the austere confraternity of Saints Syrus and Libera; this further approach to the religious sphere was reflected in his works, with an accentuation of mysticism. (Note: Domenico Morone was throughout his life a deeply religious man, at least according to Vasari who described him as a «persona tanto da bene e così religiosa e costumata, che mai s'udì uscire dalla sua bocca parola meno fusse che onesta». In and.)

In 1523 he painted a Madonna and Child with saints, now heavily damaged by weathering, for the lateral prothyrum of the San Fermo Maggiore church, while the following year he created an altarpiece depicting an Assumption of the Virgin for the Church of Saints Syrus and Libera, commissioned by the confraternity of which he was a member. Already in 1520, the same confraternity had entrusted him with another altarpiece with the Madonna and Saint Paul and Saint Anthony of Padua and Saint John the Evangelist, of which today only two fragments remain, preserved in the Castelvecchio Museum. In 1526 he devoted himself to the creation of a canvas depicting the Madonna with Saints John the Baptist and John the Evangelist for the parish church of Quinto di Valpantena, and the lunette with an Eternal Father for the altarpiece Madonna of the Girdle by Girolamo dai Libri, located in the fourth chapel on the left of the San Giorgio in Braida church (although some authors attribute the lunette to Domenico Brusasorzi rather than to Morone). In the last years of his life he was also the author of «sweet and melancholy Madonnas», among them one painted in 1528, of which a fragment is today preserved in the Chapter Library of Verona.

In 1529 he signed what is considered today to be his last work, an Eternal Father with the Virgin and Saints Roch and Joachim intended for the church of San Rocco in Soave (later moved to the parish church of the same town for fear of theft). On 12 May of the same year he dictated his will, in the presence of two witnesses: the miniaturist Callisto dai Libri and the painter Battista Farinati. In his last wishes, he entrusted his young son Giuseppe to his friend Girolamo dai Libri. Giuseppe later followed in his father's footsteps together with his cousin, although as of 2023 no works of theirs are known. According to the register of the confraternity to which he belonged, Francesco Morone died the following day. As reported by Carlo Cipolla, he was buried next to his father in the convent of San Bernardino, where many of his most important works are still preserved today.

== Style and criticism ==
As mentioned, Francesco was trained in his father's workshop, whom he soon surpassed in skill, as Vasari recounts. (Note: Vasari states that «in poco tempo riuscì molto miglior maestro che il padre stato non-era». In.) In the following centuries, however, critics reassessed the works of Domenico Morone, considered one of the main protagonists of the transition of the Veronese school of painting towards the Renaissance after a period of creative crisis, assigning to the son a less incisive role, given his late emancipation from his father's style. In any case, Francesco fully belongs among the protagonists of the second generation of Renaissance painters in Verona, who were able to combine the Mantegnesque experience learned in the workshop with currents coming from the flourishing Venetian artistic scene.

Although at first he showed himself strongly tied to his father's schemes, in adulthood he managed to elaborate a personal style characterized by meticulous attention to naturalistic details (an aspect he shared with his friend Girolamo dai Libri) and by a careful study of perspective and lighting, aimed at giving depth and realism to his compositions. To achieve this, he often placed the protagonists of his works within architectural scenographies, in the manner of Mantegna’s teaching. Variegated draperies, sumptuous garments and naturalistic landscapes are further recurring elements in his production.

In the last years of his life, his painting failed to evolve in step with the rapid transformations that were renewing the Veronese scene, enlivened by the innovative solutions introduced by Giovanni Francesco Caroto and by his pupil Paolo Morando. His last works reflect a further deepening of his religious sentiment, as evident from the marked mysticism that permeates them.

== Works ==
- Virgin and Child, Pinacoteca di Brera, Milan
- Virgin and Child, National Gallery, London
- Samson and Delilah, Museo Poldi Pezzoli, Milan
- Frescos at Santa Chiara Church, Verona

== Bibliography ==
- Roberto Alloro, ed. (2015). San Pietro in Cattedra a Marcellise. La chiesa e la comunità. Verona: Scripta edizioni. ISBN 978-88-98877-22-5.
- Antonio Avena, ed. (1947). Capolavori della pittura veronese : catalogo illustrato della mostra. Verona: Officine grafiche Albarelli.
- Benini, Gianfranco (1995). Le chiese di Verona: guida storico-artistica. Verona: Rotary Club di Verona Est.
- Berenson, Bernard (1907). North Italian painters of the Renaissance. New York-London: G.P. Putnam's Sons.
- Bisognin, Davide; Guastella, Giuseppe (2009). La chiesa di San Bernardino: visita guidata. Verona: Ottaviani.
- Brenzoni, Raffaello (1956). Domenico Morone 1438-9 c.-1517 c.: vita ed opere. Firenze: Olschki.
- Brugnoli, Pierpaolo (1954). La chiesa di San Giorgio. Le Guide, 5. Verona.
- Gino Castiglioni, ed. (2008). Per Girolamo dai Libri: pittore e miniatore del Rinascimento veronese. Venezia: Marsilio. ISBN 978-88-317-9611-8.
- Del Bravo, Carlo (1962). "Francesco Morone". Paragone: mensile di arte figurativa e letteratura. Firenze: Sansoni.
- Gerola, Giuseppe (1909). "Questioni Storiche D'Arte Veronese". Madonna Verona. Verona: Tipografia A. Gurisatti.
- Gerola, Giuseppe (1913). Le antiche pale di S. Maria in Organo di Verona. Bergamo: Istituto italiano d'arti grafiche.
- Museo di Castelvecchio (2010). Paola Marini; Ettore Napione; Gianni Peretti (eds.). Museo di Castelvecchio. Catalogo generale dei dipinti e delle miniature delle collezioni civiche veronesi. Dalla fine del X all'inizio del XVI secolo. Vol. 1. Cinisello Balsamo: Silvana. ISBN 978-88-8215-425-7.
- Rognini, Luciano (1974). Pierpaolo Brugnoli (ed.). Francesco Morone. Maestri della pittura veronese. Verona: Banca Mutua Popolare.
- Vasari, Giorgio (1568). Le vite de' più eccellenti pittori, scultori e architettori. Firenze.
- Viviani, Giuseppe Franco (2004). Chiese nel Veronese. Verona: Società cattolica di assicurazione.
- Zamperini, Alessandra (2013). "La Libreria Sagramoso di San Bernardino di Verona e qualche ipotesi per Domenico Morone". In Monica Molteni; Paola Artoni (eds.). Storia, conservazione e tecniche nella libreria Sagramoso di San Bernardino a Verona. Treviso: ZeL. ISBN 978-88-96600-33-7.
- Zannandreis, Diego (1891). Giuseppe Biadego (ed.). Le vite dei pittori scultori e architetti veronesi. Verona: Stabilimento Tipo-Litografico G. Franchini.
- C. Del Bravo : Sul seguito veronese di A. Mantegna e Francesco Morone in "Paragone" (1962)
