= Paolo Morando =

Italian painter (1486–1522)

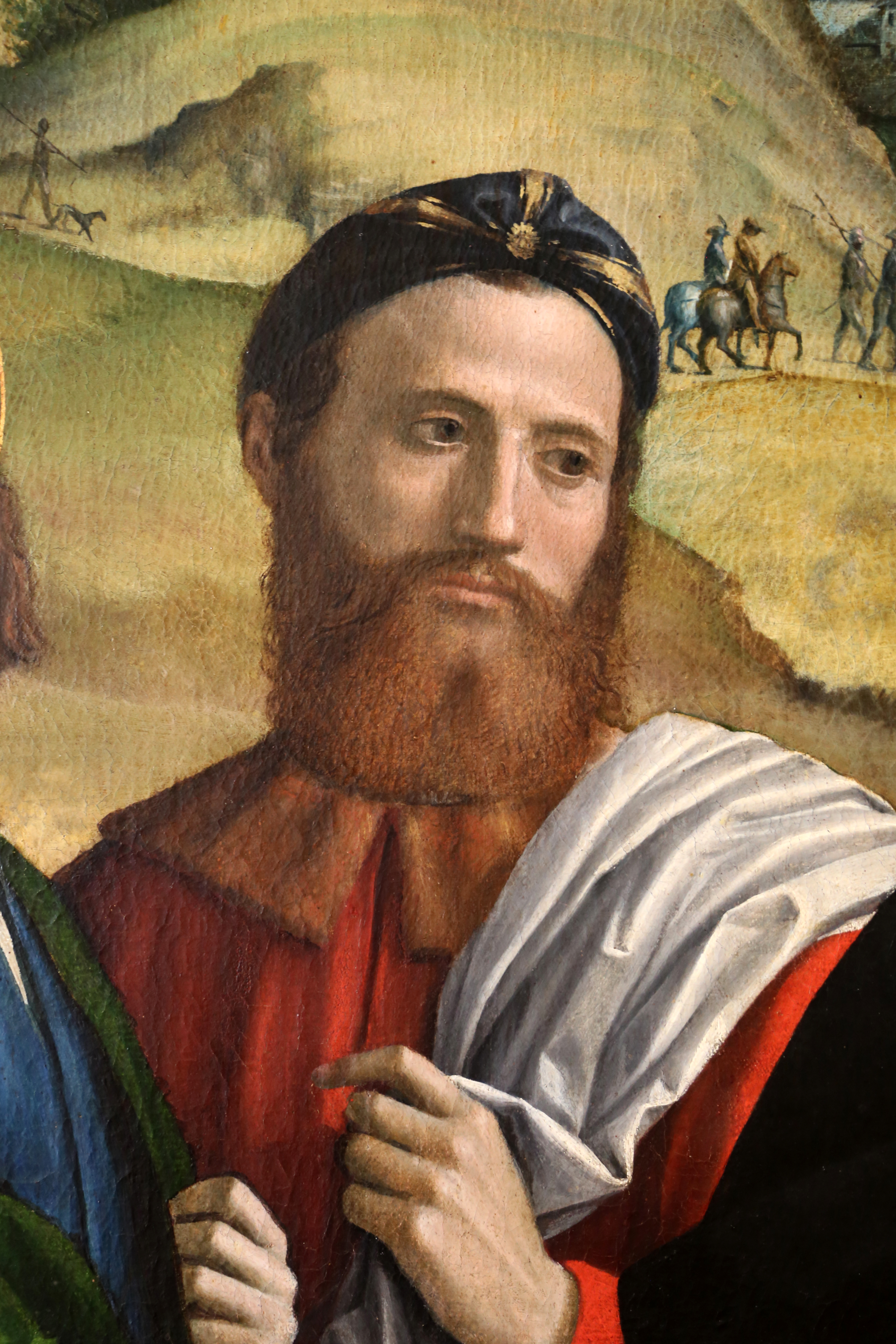
Probable self-portrait of Paolo Morando

Paolo Morando (1486–1522), also known as il Cavazzola, was an Italian painter of the Renaissance, active mainly in his hometown of Verona. He appears to have been a pupil of Domenico Morone and his son Francesco Morone. He painted in a style resembling that of Giorgione.

He first trained in the bottega of Domenico Morone and later in that of his son, Francesco. His first documented work dates to 1508: it is a Madonna and Child, now preserved in the Castelvecchio Museum. In 1514 he collaborated on the decoration of the San Biagio Chapel in the Church of Saints Nazaro and Celso in Verona, where he showed that he had already reached a pictorial maturity independent of his masters’ teaching.

His masterpiece, however, was created in 1517, when the Compagnia della Croce commissioned him to paint the Polyptych of the Passion for the Church of San Bernardino in Verona. This polyptych, consisting of five canvases and a predella with four panels, shows a skillful combination of the different artistic currents popular in Verona at the time. In addition to the usual references to Venetian and Lombard masters, one can note the influences of Andrea Mantegna, Giovanni Bellini, Giovan Francesco Caroto, and even suggestions from Northern Europe.

In the following years, Morando went through a particularly prolific period, alternating works of sacred art with portrait painting. His lively artistic activity came to an abrupt end on 13 August 1522, when death overtook him while still young. His last known work, the Altarpiece of the Virtues, is considered one of his finest canvases. Besides his native city, his works are today displayed in numerous museums across Europe.

== Biography ==
=== Birth and training ===
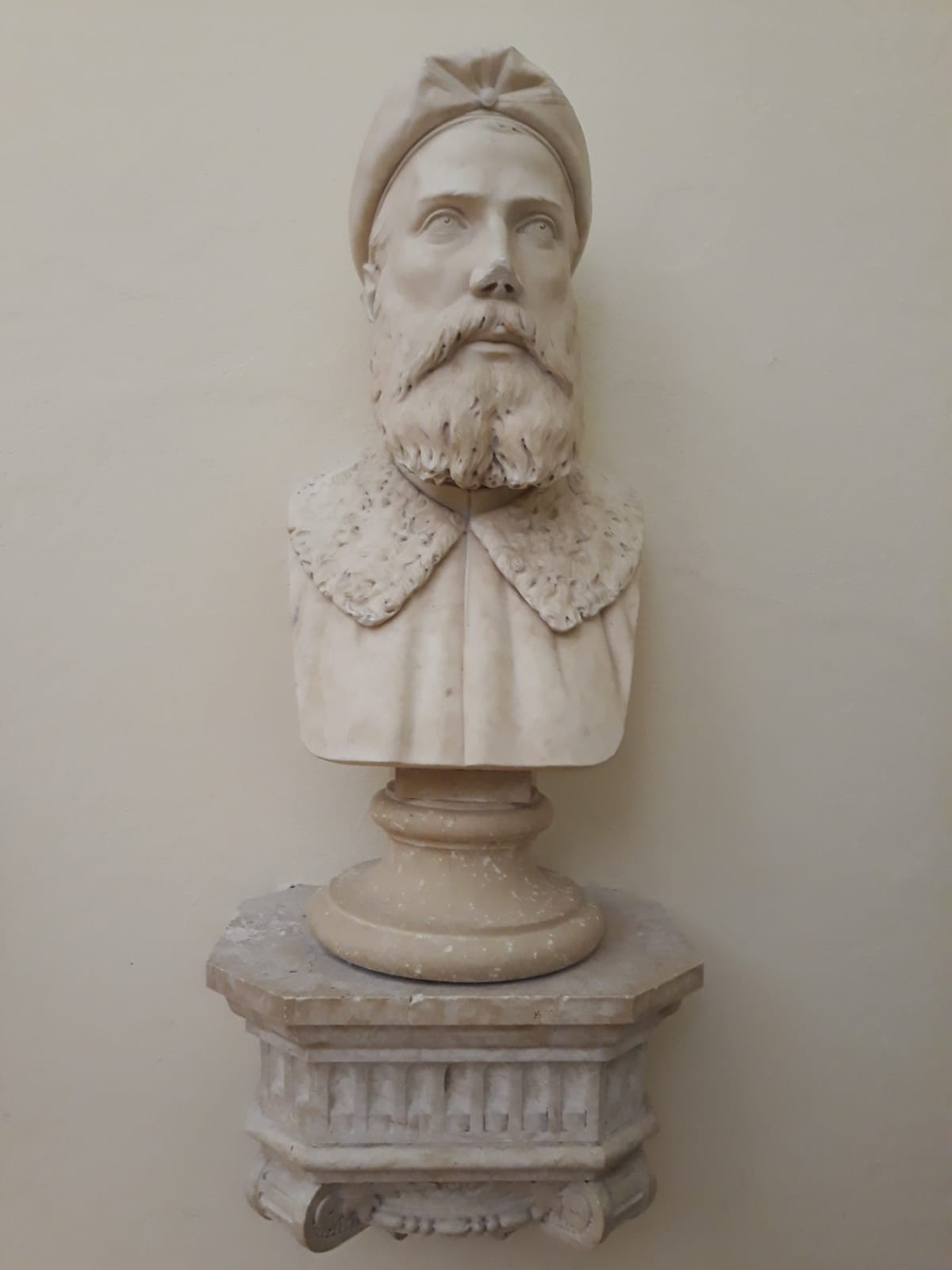
The bust of Paolo Morando at the protomoteca of the Verona Public Library

Paolo Morando, nicknamed "Cavazzòla" like his father, was born in Verona between 1486 and 1488. His father, Taddeo Morando, was a cloth merchant, a pezarolus in the terminology of the time. The Morando family probably lived in the contrada of San Vitale in Verona, an area mainly inhabited by textile workers, but later moved to the contrada of San Paolo. Paolo lived with his parents until 1517. His personal life is little known, and the available information comes mainly from the biography written by Giorgio Vasari in Le Vite, where he is described as a «young man of excellent character and without any blemish of vice».

His artistic training began in the workshop of Domenico Morone, where he came into contact with other painters such as Girolamo dai Libri and Michele da Verona. He later continued his apprenticeship with Francesco Morone, Domenico’s son. From the Morones he mainly learned the bright, reddish tonalities and the attention to luminosity.

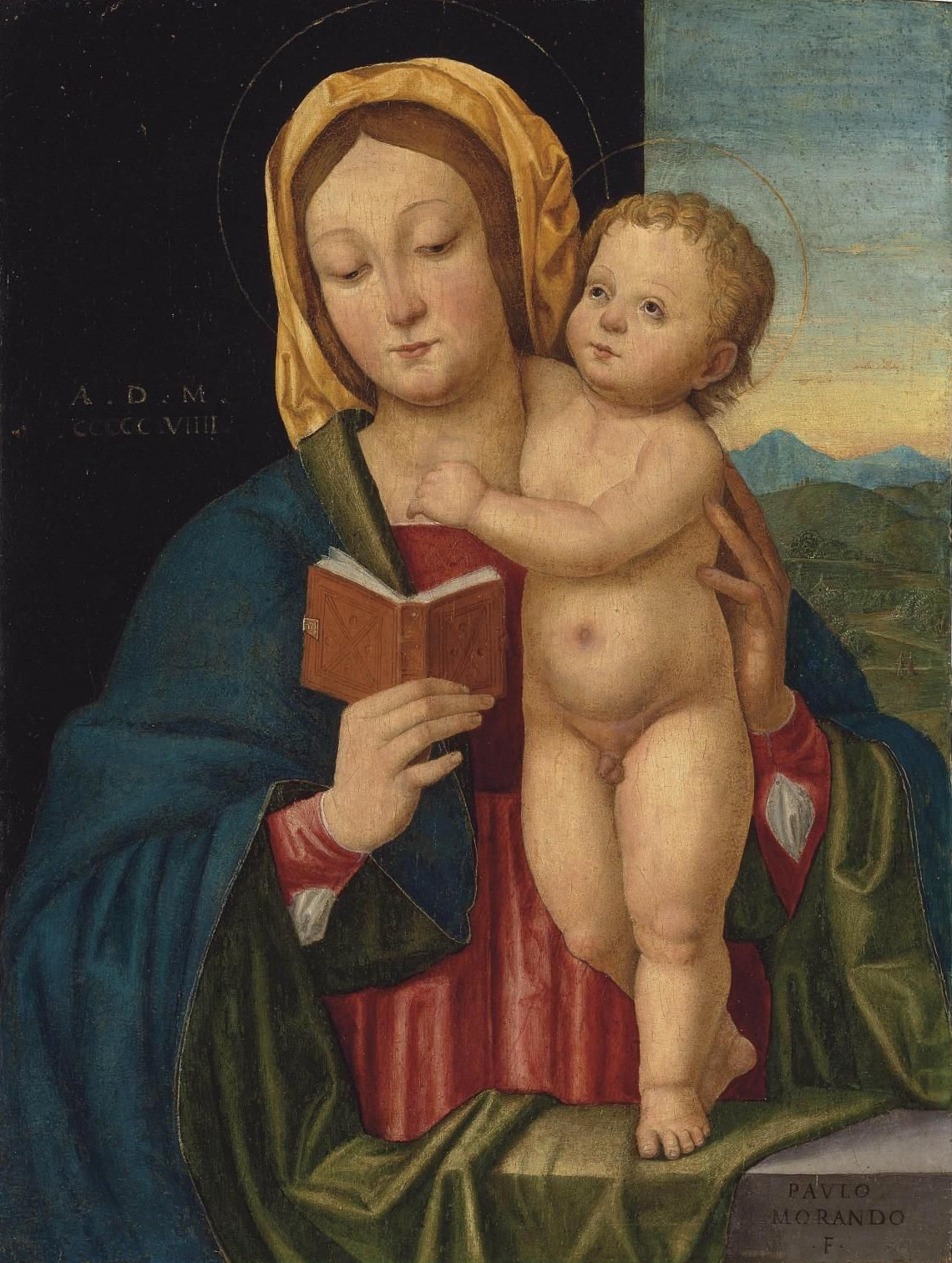
Madonna and Child Reading, Villa Cagnola, Varese

His first known work is a Madonna and Child, painted probably before 1508 and now kept in the Castelvecchio Museum in Verona. This painting shows stylistic influences of Francesco Morone, to the point that it seems «almost an anonymous workshop product were it not» for Paolo’s signature. His later works, such as the Madonna and Child with Angels, now at the Gallerie dell'Accademia in Venice, and the Madonna and Child Reading dated 1509 and preserved at Villa Cagnola in Varese, show greater originality and liveliness, so much so that Vasari remarked that Paolo "knew much more than his master." These works are excellent examples of the Veronese school of painting, skillfully enriched with influences from other artists, such as Andrea Solario and Vincenzo Foppa. Similarities have also been noted with Francesco Bonsignori in terms of plasticity and the sculptural-like intensity of the shadows.

=== Maturity ===
In 1509 he assisted his master Francesco Morone in creating the decorative apparatus of the Miniscalchi Chapel in the Basilica of Santa Anastasia in Verona, a work completed the following year. It is believed that the two painters depicted a Pentecost for the apse basin, although since 2008 scholars have questioned Morando’s actual participation, suggesting that the work was executed by Morone alone. The altarpiece and the predella of the chapel are instead works from 1518 by Niccolò Giolfino.

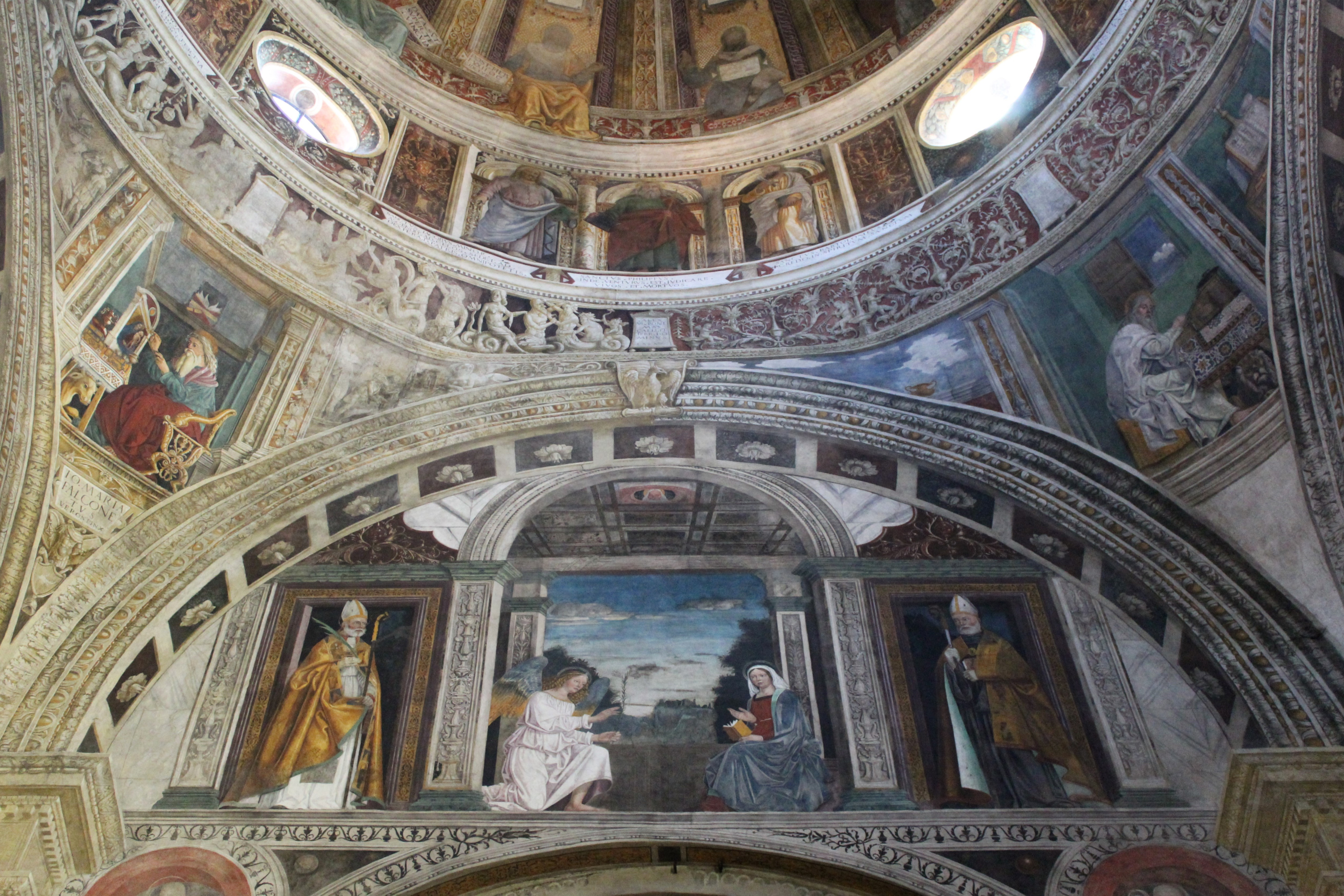
Annunciation with Saint Blaise and Saint Zeno, San Biagio Chapel, Verona

Later, Paolo collaborated in the decoration of the San Biagio Chapel in the Church of Saints Nazaro and Celso in Verona. The project, begun in 1497 (although the construction of the chapel had already started in 1488), saw the participation of some of the most renowned Veronese painters of the time. Alongside Morando, there were also Giovanni Maria Falconetto, Francesco and Domenico Morone, and Bartolomeo Montagna, who together created «the most important ornamental enterprise in Verona at the turn of the two centuries». Within this grand decorative scheme, Cavazzòla painted an Annunciation flanked by Saint Blaise and Saint Zeno inside panels. Following the lead set by Falconetto, the main artist of the chapel, Morando adopted painted architecture with perspective solutions typical of the previous century. The background landscape is Lombard-inspired, while the two saints reveal the influence of Montagna’s contribution to the same chapel. In this work, Cavazzòla demonstrated that he had fully assimilated his early lessons, such as the plasticity of forms, the clarity of colors, and the luminosity-filled ornaments, set against a perspective-illusionistic background sensitive to the work of Bramante and Mantegna. Regarding his contribution, it has also been noted that it «marks the prominence he had reached at that moment, now detached from his master».

In 1514 he also signed a Madonna with the Infant Saint John, kept in Berlin but destroyed in 1945, another clear testimony of his «emancipation from Morone’s style».

=== The masterpiece: Polyptych of the Passion ===
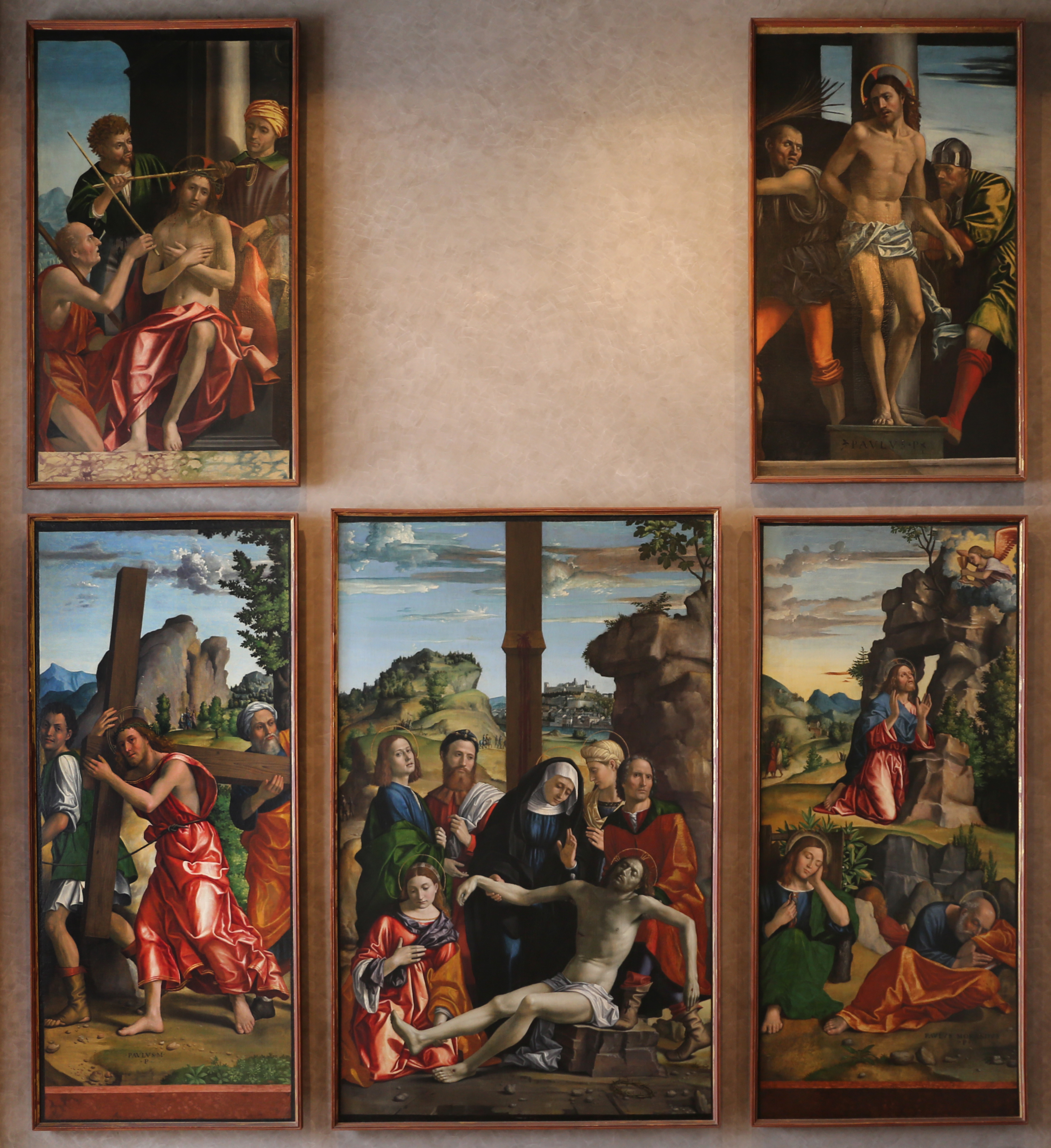
Polyptych of the Passion, Castelvecchio Museum, Verona

Around 1517, Paolo Morando began working for the Franciscan convent of San Bernardino in Verona. He first painted a fresco in the cloister, depicting Saint Francis of Assisi (now lost) and Saint Bernardino. But it was for the Avanzi Chapel of the same monastery that he created, also around 1517, what is considered his masterpiece: the so-called Polyptych of the Passion. Cavazzòla received the commission from the Compagnia della Croce, which desired a work composed of five canvases to be placed in separate panels and a predella with four boards.

Considered a «very creative composition in the Veronese Renaissance panorama», critics have noted how it borrowed from several other authors, especially the classicists of central Italy, as well as the usual Venetian and Lombard masters. In the canvas Agony in the Garden the influences of Giovanni Bellini, Giovan Francesco Caroto, and German art are evident. Other references can be found in Andrea Mantegna’s San Zeno Altarpiece, which greatly inspired the Veronese school. At the center of the polyptych stands the large canvas with the Deposition of Christ, structured «in three overlapping planes, distributing the figures into groups connected by the arrangement of Christ’s arms». According to Vasari, Cavazzòla painted his self-portrait in the figure of Nicodemus on the left side of the scene, and it seems that the other faces were also portraits of Morando’s friends (possibly other artists), with the exception of Mary of Clopas, whose features derive from an engraving by Marcantonio Raimondi.

The critic Christian Hornig observed that in the composition and in the faces, «Cavazzòla in a certain sense creates a synthesis between the immobile plasticism of the Morone and the eccentric dynamism of Liberale. The landscape in the background, with a veduta of Verona in cool white-blue tones, expresses the almost independent Mantegnesque position of the Veronese school, which does not adopt the fusion of forms typical of Venetian Giorgionism, but continues to build individual figures characterized by strong plasticism, detached from the landscape».

The polyptych is now displayed at the Castelvecchio Museum in Verona, while in the Avanzi Chapel it has been replaced by a 19th-century copy.

=== Peak ===
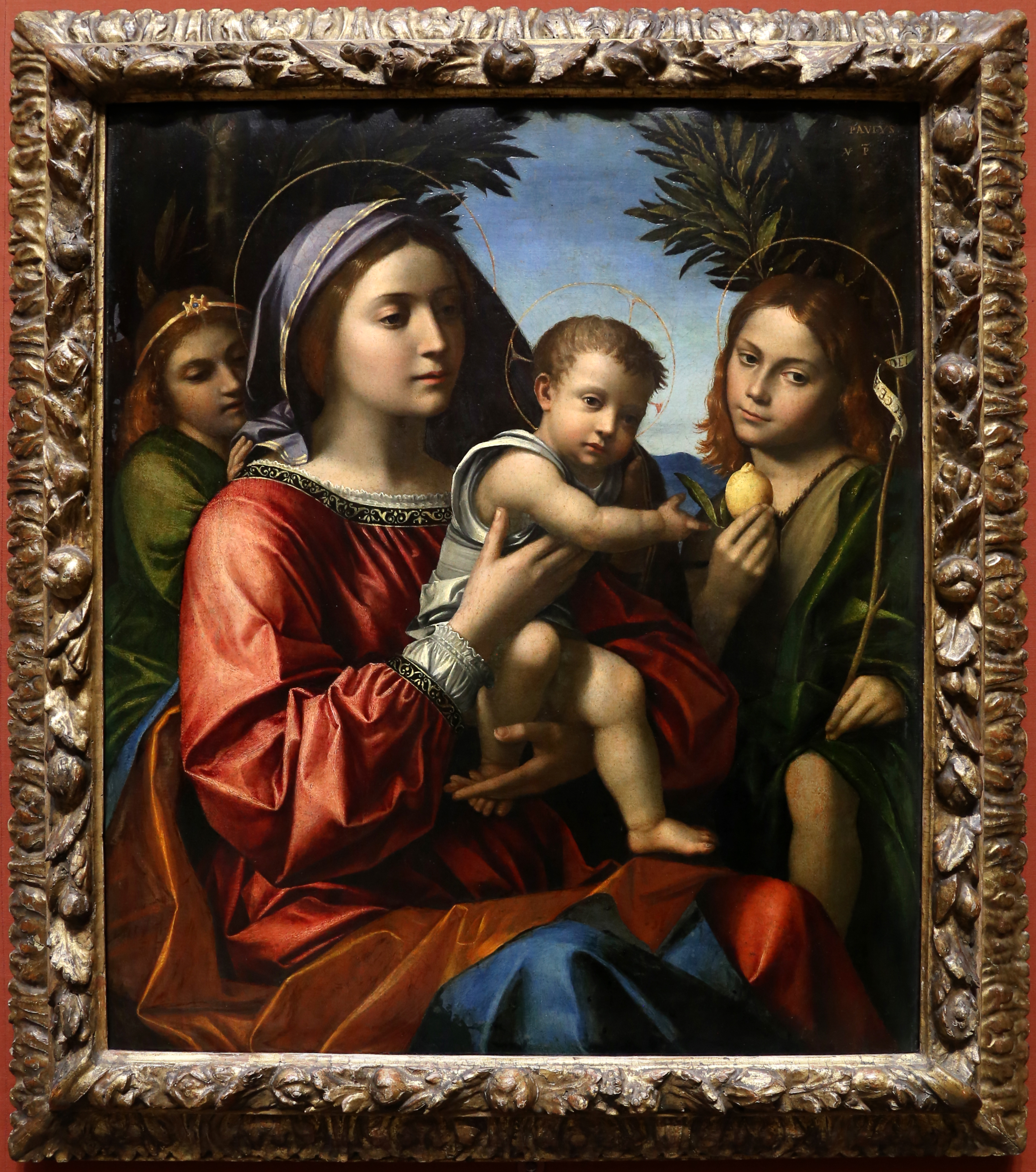
Madonna and Child with Saint John and an Angel, National Gallery, London

The Polyptych enterprise brought Paolo Morando great success, earning him numerous new commissions that accompanied him throughout his short life. Between 1518 and 1519 he produced several works. Among them, a Madonna and Child, now at the Museo Poldi Pezzoli in Milan; a Madonna and Child with an Angel, preserved at the Städel Museum in Frankfurt; and a Madonna and Child with Saint John and an Angel, on deposit at the National Gallery in London, where multiple influences can be seen, particularly of Leonardesque origin, considered «perhaps the most important representation of this theme left by Cavazzòla».

Also at the National Gallery, a Saint Roch of 1518 «documents the beginning of the artist’s later period», in which the «Venetian yellow tones replaced the cooler Lombard colors he had used before», and in which Morando managed to give «a new, almost dramatic depth to the expression». Originally part of a triptych, created for the Church of Santa Maria della Scala in his native city, the work also included a Virgin and Child with Saint Anne by Girolamo dai Libri and a Saint Sebastian (now lost) by Francesco Torbido.

His portraiture was also intense. In 1518 he painted a Portrait of a Man, now in the Gemäldegalerie Alte Meister in Dresden, with the «voluminous forms of the mature Cinquecento, with a grave and severe, almost melancholic expression, typical of the artist’s poetics». Another canvas of a similar subject, attributable to the same year, is kept at the National Gallery Prague. In 1519 he painted a Portrait of Giulia Trivulzio, now in a private collection, which has suggested a possible journey of the painter to Milan, which would also explain the strong Lombard influences in his later production.

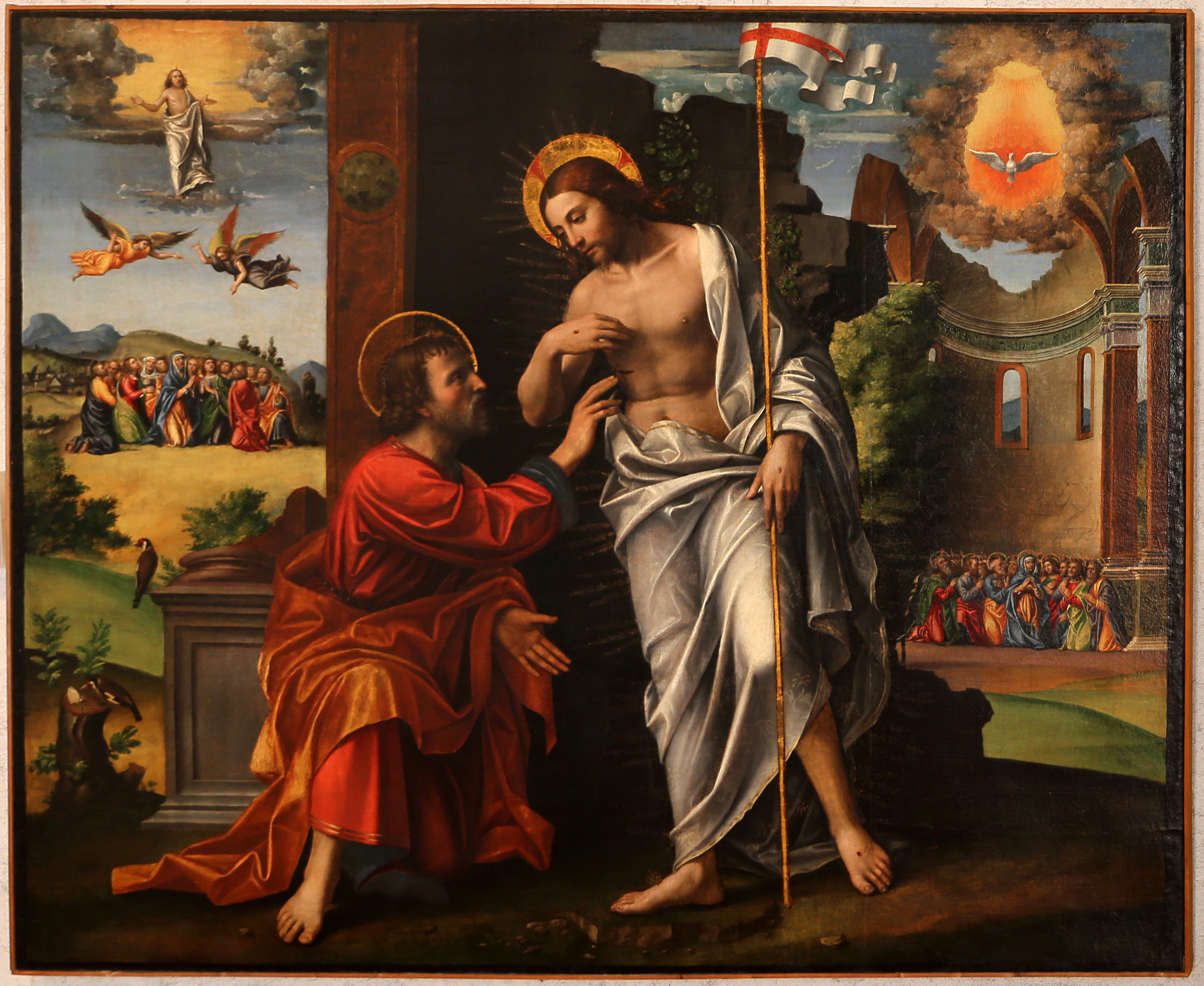
Incredulity of Saint Thomas, Castelvecchio Museum, Verona

In the following years, Morando’s last ones, his palette indeed became more severe, with dark tones typical of the Lombard manner and in particular of the Leonardesque style. Among the most significant works of this period are Incredulity of Saint Thomas, Saint Michael the Archangel and Saint Paul, Saints Peter and John the Baptist, and Saint Francis Delivering the Rule to the Poor Clares, all preserved at Verona’s Castelvecchio Museum.

Paolo Morando was also active, albeit discontinuously, as a fresco painter, particularly in the decoration of some city building façades. Among his works are the depictions of the Archangel Raphael and Tobias in via Emilei and The Sibyl Shows Augustus the Vision of the Madonna and Child for Casa Fumanelli in via Trezza. In 1520 he also painted two frescoes, a Saint Michael the Archangel and a Saint Raphael the Archangel and Tobias, for the sides of the Fontanelli Chapel in the Church of Santa Maria in Organo, both mentioned by Giorgio Vasari (« [...] the Angel Michael and the Angel Raphael, which are by the hand of Paolo Cavazzòla [...]»). In both works one can see the influences of central Italian classicism, «expressed in the balance of the poses and the restrained movement of the figures». In the Saint Michael, moreover, it has been suggested that Morando took as a model the work of Il Pordenone in the Malchiostro Chapel in the cathedral of Treviso, while in the Saint Raphael the artist reused the model he had already adopted for the Sibyl painted in via Trezza.

The attribution of the Portrait of a Warrior with his Esquire, preserved at the Uffizi Gallery in Florence, remains debated among art historians. The majority tend to place it among the works of Giorgione created at the beginning of the 16th century, while others ascribe it to the mature production of Paolo Morando, thus postponing its dating to around 1520.

=== Altarpiece of the Virtues and death ===
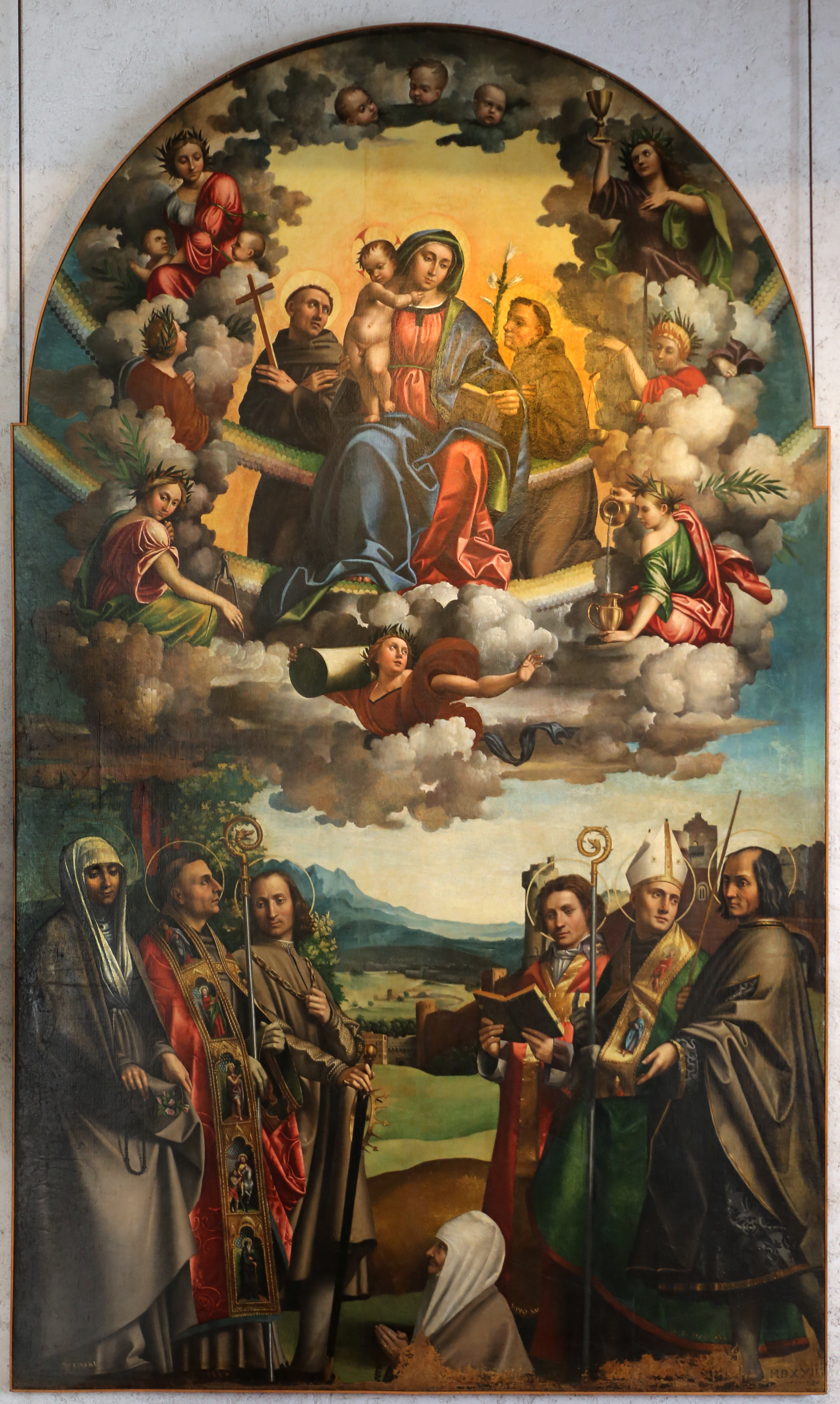
Altarpiece of the Virtues, Castelvecchio Museum, Verona

In 1522 Morando completed one of his most monumental and remarkable works: the so-called Altarpiece of the Virtues. The painting was commissioned by Bartolomea Baialotti, widow of Guglielmo da Sacco, who is depicted “in abisso”, while the widow of her son, Elisabetta Verità, lent her face to Elizabeth of Hungary, portrayed among the standing saints. The other saints in the painting, whose features are those of Veronese figures connected to the Franciscan order, are Bonaventure, Louis IX of France, Ivo, Louis of Toulouse and Lazarus of Bethany. In the upper part, Morando painted a Virgin and Child with Saints Anthony and Francis in Glory, surrounded by the theological and cardinal virtues. The altarpiece is now housed in the Castelvecchio Museum, but was originally placed in the chapel of St. Francis in the convent of San Bernardino, where it was replaced in the 19th century by a copy. The work, praised by Vasari, also included a predella divided into three sections, two of which are now preserved in Castelvecchio and the third in the Museum of Fine Arts (Budapest).

The Altarpiece of the Virtues was probably Paolo Morando’s last work. He died in Verona on 13 August 1522, as recorded in the Book of the College of Saints Siro and Libera, a confraternity of which he had been a member since 1517.

== Style ==
Morando is regarded as one of the most important and interesting artists of Renaissance Verona, a leading figure before the arrival of Battista del Moro. He is remembered mainly as a painter of sacred subjects, particularly altarpieces, but he was also an excellent portraitist, as evidenced by several of his surviving works. The only known exception outside these two genres is a Samson and Delilah, dated to the second half of the 1510s and kept at the Museo Poldi Pezzoli in Milan (although the attribution is debated, with some scholars preferring to ascribe it to Vittore Carpaccio.)

Even at a young age, he managed to develop a personal style, freeing himself from the influence of his masters, Domenico and Francesco Morone. He probably travelled outside Verona, which allowed him to encounter other artistic currents and enrich his development. His mature works reveal a monumental approach unprecedented in the Veronese context, distancing themselves from the hieratic and solemn tone typical of Domenico Morone’s painting. Although he emancipated himself from some of his masters’ stylistic features, Morando was unable to fully abandon a certain static quality, a legacy of Francesco Morone’s school that limited him to depicting simple and clearly defined movements, involving a small number of figures. Nevertheless, he was the first Veronese painter to successfully attempt large-scale action scenes.

== Major works ==
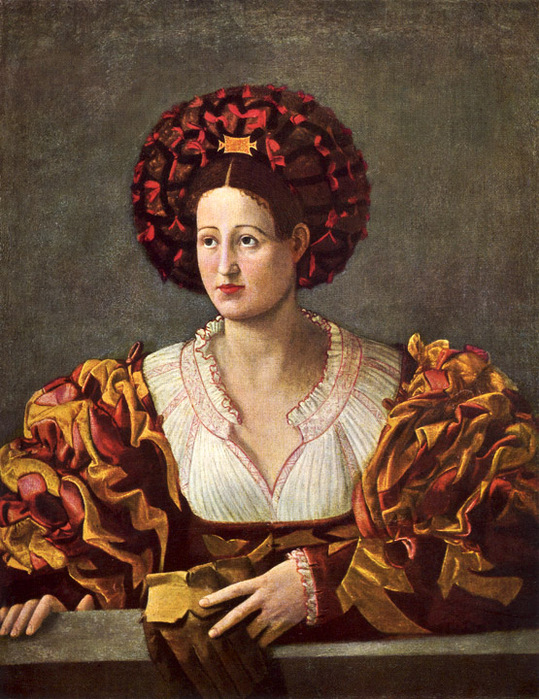
Portrait of a Lady, Accademia Carrara, Bergamo

Below is a non-exhaustive list of Paolo Morando’s main works:

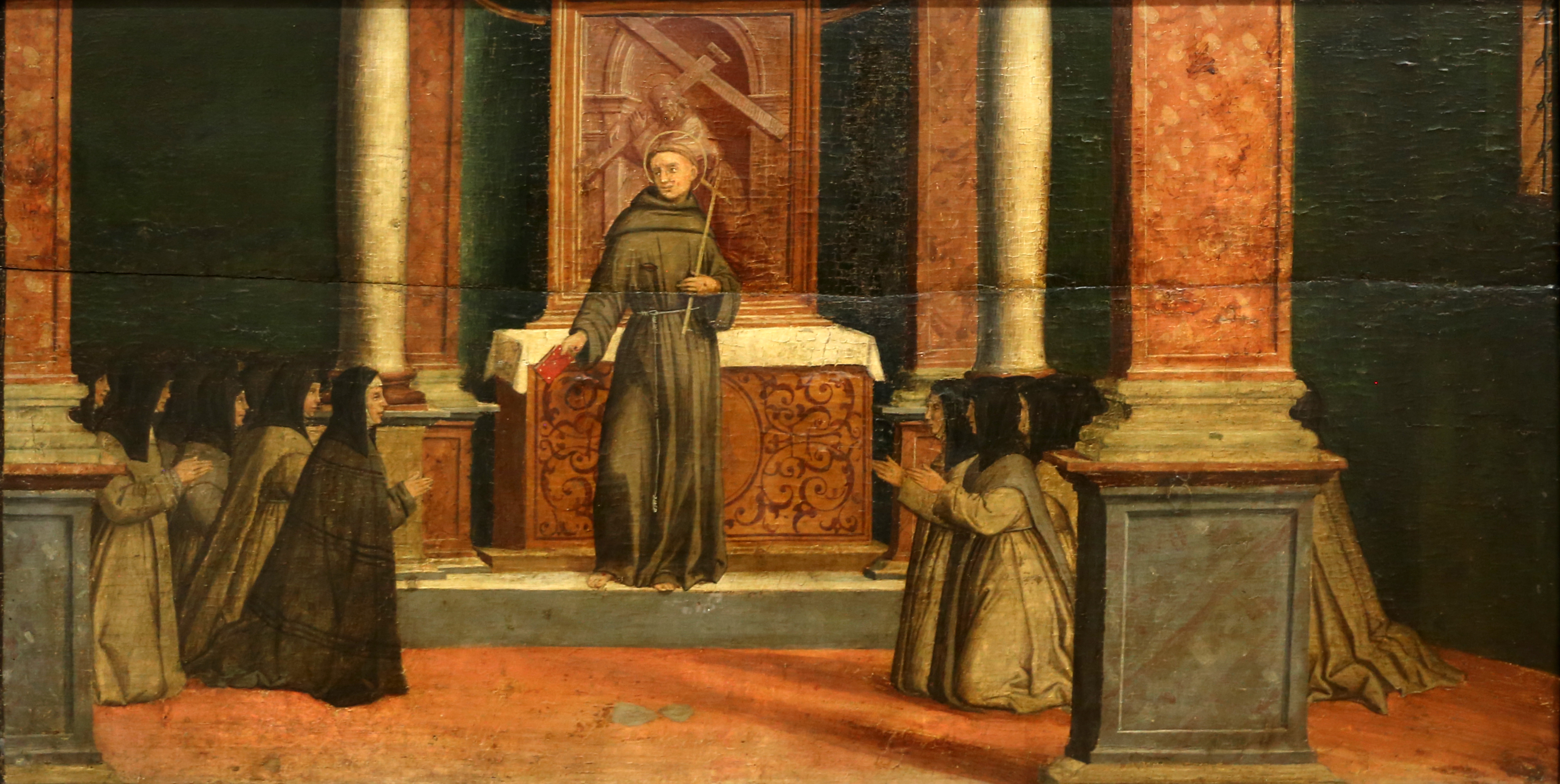
Saint Francis Giving the Rule to the Poor Clares, Castelvecchio Museum, Verona

- Annunciation, 1510, San Biagio Chapel in the church of Santi Nazaro e Celso, Verona
- Descent of the Holy Spirit, 1509–1510, Miniscalchi Chapel, Basilica of Santa Anastasia, Verona
- Incredulity of Saint Thomas, c. 1518–1519, Castelvecchio Museum, Verona
- Saints Peter and John the Baptist, Castelvecchio Museum, Verona
- Archangel Michael and Saint Paul, Castelvecchio Museum, Verona
- Madonna and Child with the Infant St. John the Baptist (also known as Madonna of the Goldfinch), Castelvecchio Museum, Verona
- Virgin and Child with the Baptist and an Angel, c. 1514–1518, National Gallery, London
- Madonna and Child, before 1508, Castelvecchio Museum, Verona
- Virgin and Child Reading, 1509, Villa Cagnola, Varese
- Virgin and Child with Saints Benedict Abbot and John the Baptist, c. 1505–1515, Church of Saints Vito, Modesto and Crescenzia, Badia Calavena
- Altarpiece of the Virtues, Castelvecchio Museum, Verona
- Polyptych of the Passion, 1517, Castelvecchio Museum, Verona
- Predella of the Polyptych of the Passion, Castelvecchio Museum, Verona
- Portrait of a Lady, Accademia Carrara, Bergamo
- Portrait of a Warrior with his Squire, c. 1518–22, Uffizi Gallery, Florence, (also attributed to Giorgione, with a dating around 1500–1510)
- Portrait of a Man, 1518, Gemäldegalerie Alte Meister, Dresden
- Saint Damian, Palazzo Chiericati, Vicenza
- Saint Francis Giving the Rule to the Poor Clares, Castelvecchio Museum, Verona
- Samson and Delilah, c. 1510–1520, Museo Poldi Pezzoli, Milan
- Virgin and Child, 1518, Museo Poldi Pezzoli, Milan

== Bibliography ==
- AA.VV. (1964). Enciclopedia Le Muse. Vol. III. Novara: De Agostini.
- Benini, Gianfranco (1995). Le chiese di Verona: guida storico-artistica. Rotary Club di Verona Est. Benini, 1995.
- Boskovits, Miklós; Fossaluzza, Giorgio, eds. (1998). La collezione Cagnola. I dipinti. Busto Arsizio: Nomos Edizioni.
- Castagnetti, Andrea (1990). "Mercanti, società e politica nella Marca veronese-trevigiana (secoli XI-XIV)" (PDF). Verona: Libreria universitaria editrice. Castagnetti, 1990.
- Cipolla, Carlo (1914). Ricerche storiche intorno alla chiesa di Santa Anastasia in Verona. Cipolla, 1914.
- Hornig, Christian (1974). "Paolo Cavazzola". In Pierpaolo Brugnoli (ed.). Maestri della pittura veronese. Verona: Banca Mutua Popolare. Hornig, 1974.
- Marinelli, Sergio (1996). "Il Cinquecento. Tomo I: Il primo Cinquecento a Verona". In Mauro Lucco (ed.). La pittura nel Veneto. Milano: Electa. ISBN 88-435-5739-4. Marinelli, 1996.
- Museo di Castelvecchio (2010). Paola Marini; Ettore Napione; Gianni Peretti (eds.). Museo di Castelvecchio. Catalogo generale dei dipinti e delle miniature delle collezioni civiche veronesi. Dalla fine del X all'inizio del XVI secolo. Volume 1. Cinisello Balsamo: Silvana. ISBN 978-88-8215-425-7.
- Tessari, Umberto Gaetano (1958). La chiesa di San Nazaro. Verona: Vita Veronese.
- Vasari, Giorgio (1568). Le vite de' più eccellenti pittori, scultori e architettori. Firenze. Vasari, 1568.
