= Zenone Veronese =

Italian painter

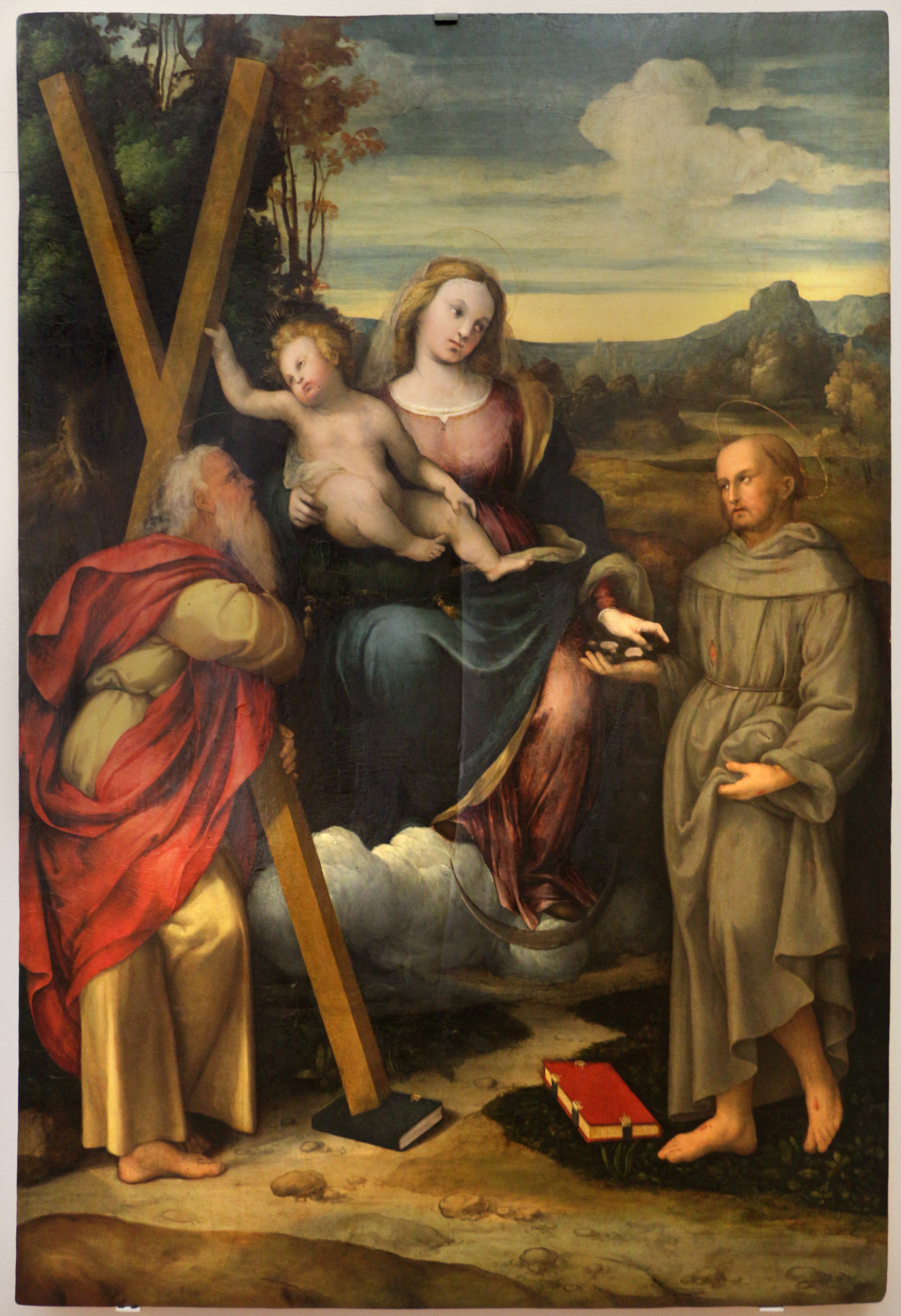
Madonna and Child with St. Andrew and St. Francis

Zenone Veronese (Zeno da Verona) (1484 – 1542) was an Italian painter of the Renaissance period. He is different but a near-contemporary of Michele da Verona (1470 -1536/1544).

== Biography ==
He was born in Verona, and died as late as 1552-54 by some accounts. He worked in Sala in the Ticino on Lago di Garda, in Rimini (1521), and possibly in Rome. He was influenced by Giovanni Francesco Caroto and Girolamo dai Libri, later by Palma Vecchio, il Romanino, and Giovanni Cariani. He recalls Niccolo Giolfino in his style.
