= Francesco Zanoni =

Italian painter

Francesco Zanoni (died 1782) was an Italian painter and restorer active mainly in Padua. He mainly worked on sacred works including at Santa Maria in Vanzo, Padua.
