= San Biagio Chapel =

Chapel in Verona, Italy

- Cappella di San Biagio
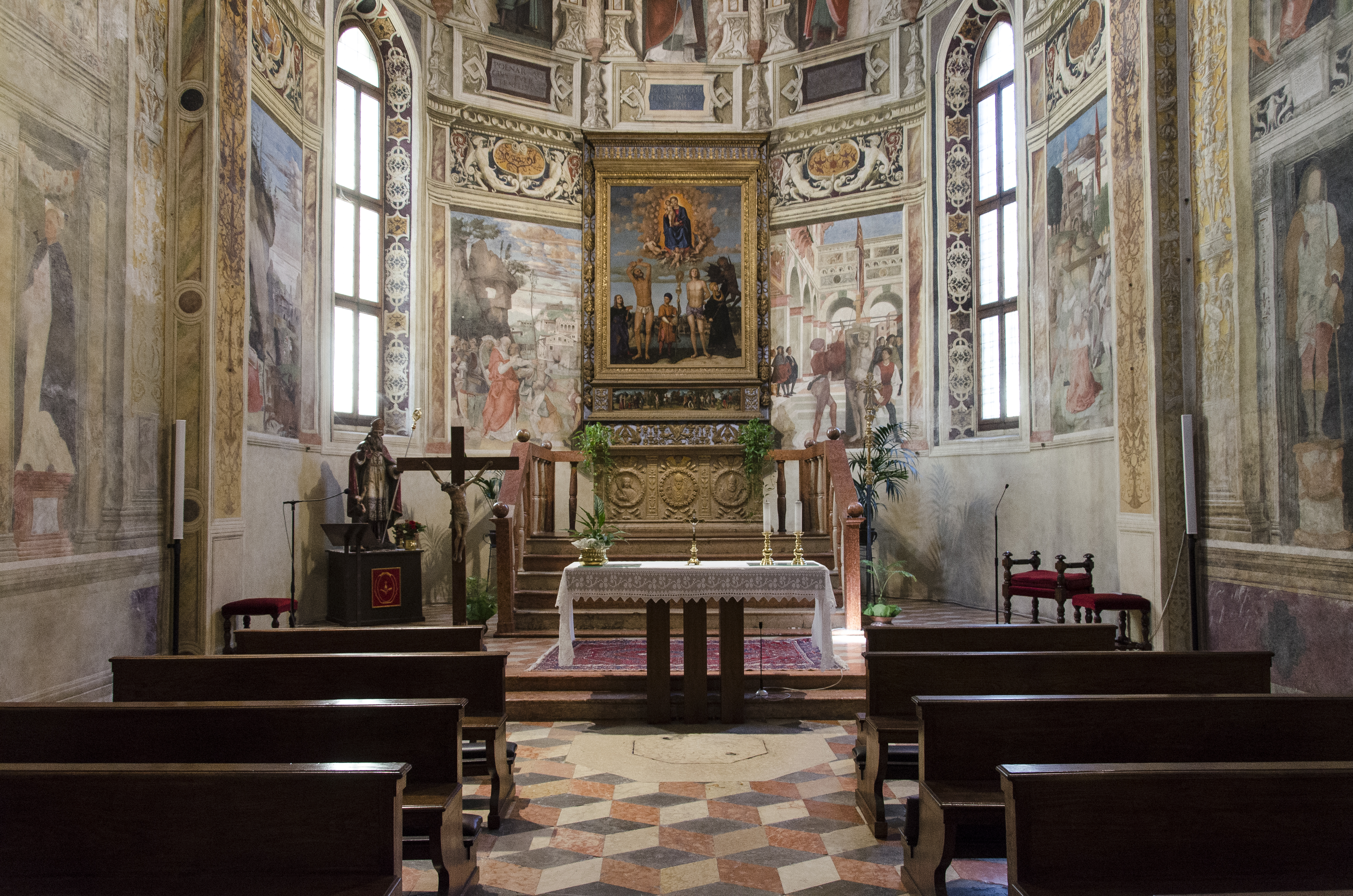
- San Biagio Chapel
- Location: Verona, Veneto, Italy
- Denomination: Catholic

Architecture
- Style: Gothic
- Groundbreaking: 1488

Administration
- Diocese: Roman Catholic Diocese of Verona

The chapel of St. Blaise (Italian: Cappella di San Biagio), located inside the church of Santi Nazaro e Celso in Verona, was built at the behest of the confraternity of San Biagio beginning in 1488 to house the relics of the saint of the same name, bishop of Sebastea in Armenia, which arrived there in 1174 following a German baron. The chapel was designed by architect Beltrame Iarola assisted by Giovanni Maria Falconetto, with the latter also responsible for much of the pictorial decoration. The solemn translation of the relics took place at Easter 1508 but the consecration of the chapel was held later, on January 31, 1529, in a ceremony presided over by Gian Pietro Carafa, the future Pope Paul IV.

All the walls of the chapel are frescoed by some of the most important Veronese painters of the 16th century, among whom, in addition to Falconetto, were Bartolomeo Montagna, Paolo Morando (known as Cavazzola), Domenico Morone and Girolamo dai Libri. The polygonal apse houses an altarpiece by Francesco Bonsignori and a valuable raised altar with the ark of Saints Blaise and Juliana by Bernardino Panteo.

== History ==
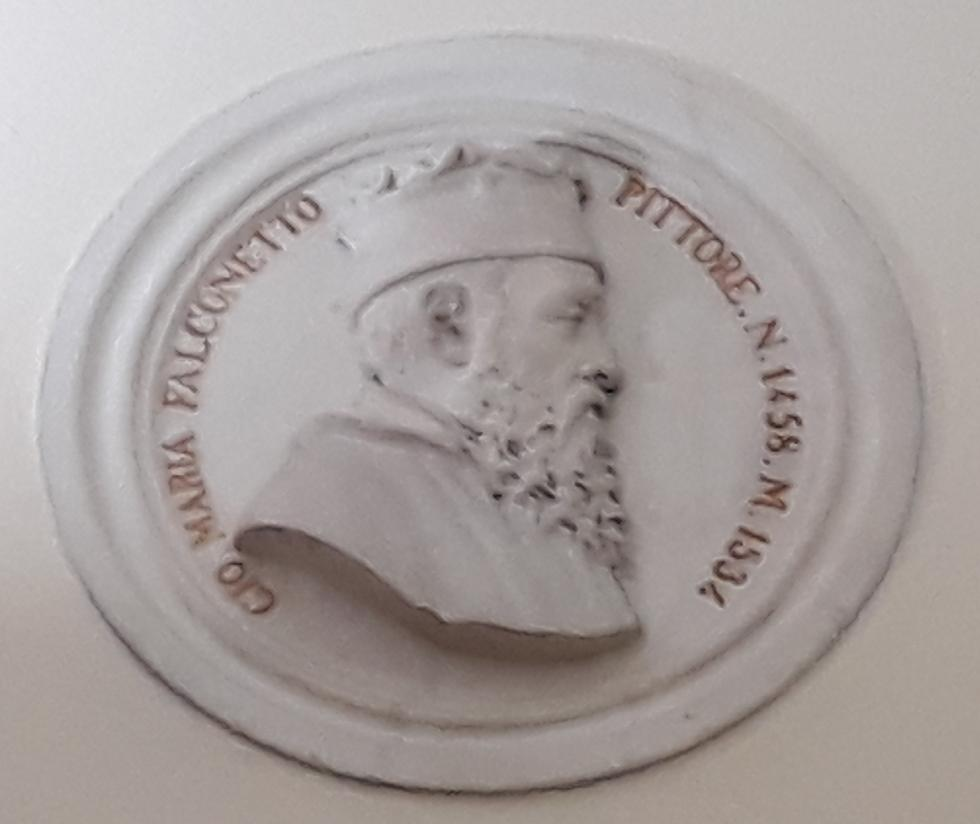
Effigy of the painter Gian Maria Falconetto at the protomoteca of the Verona Civic Library

On December 3, 1174, a German baron named Boniface, who was part of Emperor Frederick Barbarossa's retinue in what would go down in history as the Third Crusade, was hosted at the monastery's hospice. Boniface died shortly thereafter, but before he died he decided to pay homage to the abbot who had assisted him, Father Adriano. The monks decided to temporarily store the precious relics under the high altar. It was not until the 15th century that it was decided to build the chapel, so as to find a more suitable place to hold the relics of the saints in the possession of the monastery. Construction began on March 7, 1488, with the laying of the foundation stone by Abbot Germano da Piacenza. The following year, noting the need for greater control over the work, the “Compagnia di San Biagio,” a congregation formed for the purpose, was formed and given the task of financing the building, administering the bequests and taking care of the liturgical functions; at the same time Beltrame Iarola, also known as Beltramo Valsolda because he was a native of Valsolda, was given the task of supervising the work.

Art historians tend to judge Beltrame's work positively, believing that he succeeded in giving “the chapel organicity, homogeneity and monumental dignity.” However, in the design of the work he was joined by the young painter Giovanni Maria Falconetto, who had recently been trained during a long stay in Rome, to whom most recognize the true authorship of the work, relegating Beltrame to the role, though not marginal, of executor and director of the building site. In any case, the basic project of the architect from Como included a cubic structure closed at the top by a large dome and the insertion of an apsidal structure in Gothic style. Two sepulchral shrines placed on the right and left flanks were also designed, which were later sold to some of the financiers of the work: to Antonio del Gaio for 50 ducats and to Zuan Antonio Britti for 30, respectively. The confraternity of St. Blaise also procured the opening of four sepulchres, equal and placed in the floor, for the purpose of housing the mortal remains of their brethren.

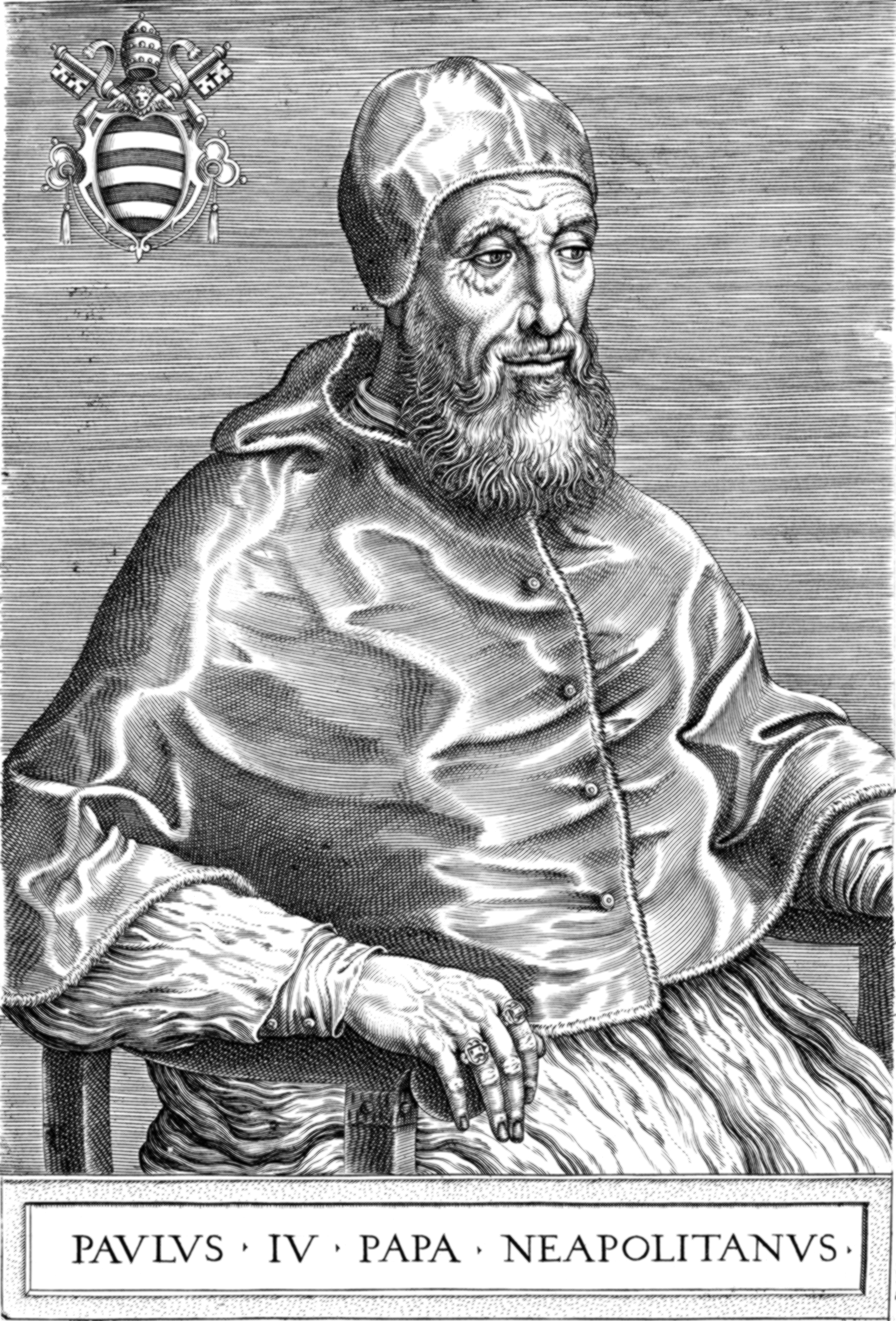
Portrait of Pope Paul IV (Gian Pietro Carafa) by Onofrio Panvinio

Beltrame was also responsible for hiring artists to execute the various works of decoration of the chapel under construction. The sculptor Bernardino Panteo was entrusted with the creation of the altar into which the relics would later be moved, Bartolomeo Montagna was commissioned to paint four scenes from the life of St. Blaise, while Gian Maria Falconetto and Francesco Morone were designated as painters of the chapel's frescoes.

The first religious service in the new chapel was held on July 30, 1491, while the solemn translation of the saint's relic took place at Easter 1508. However, the work was not yet finished but went on for another twenty years, reaching completion only in 1528. Finally, on January 31, 1529, Gian Pietro Carafa, the future Pope Paul IV, was able to consecrate the chapel; at that time the abbot of the adjoining monastery was Giovanmaria da Reggio. In the following years the flooring work was completed, carried out by workers employed by Pietro and Gabriele Caliari, respectively grandfather and father of the painter Paolo Veronese.

== Description ==
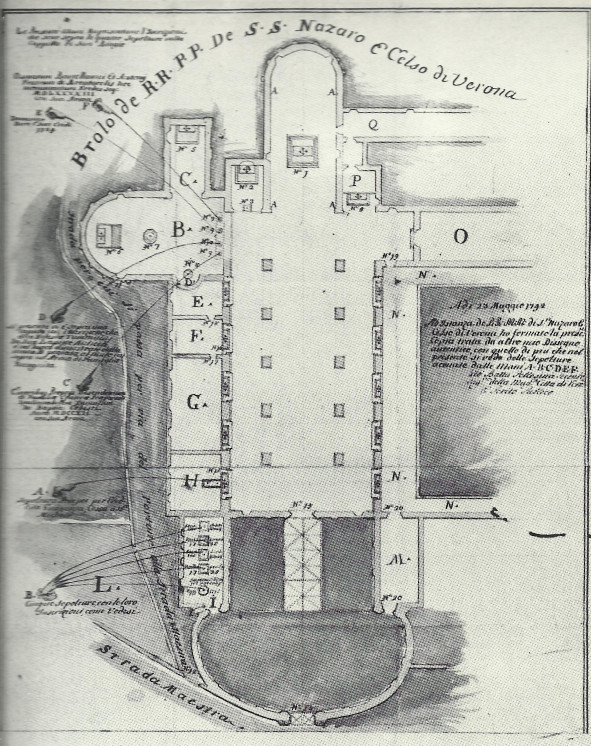
18th-century plan of the church of Santi Nazaro e Celso, the letter B marks the chapel of San Biagio

To access the Chapel of St. Blaise, one crosses an archway 7.60 meters wide and 8.53 meters high that starts at the end of the left arm of the transept from the Church of Saints Nazarius and Celsus. Basically, its architecture is composed of three overlapping volumes: the first level is formed by a cube, the second by an octagonal drum, and the third by a dome.

The base, therefore, has a square plan with sides of 8.20 meters whose walls, 8.25 meters high, are made of solid brick with a thickness of 0.65 meters. On the left side is the Britti chapel, of modest depth, while on the opposite side, of more considerable size, is the Gaio chapel; at the back, however, is the apse, whose walls, also made of brick, are slightly thicker, reaching 0.83 meters. The roof of the apse is vaulted with seven segments divided by Gothic-style ribs.

The next octagonal drum is 5.30 meters high, and in it are four large circular windows set at the extension of the spandrels supporting the drum itself. Finally, the dome above, the impost of which is 16.40 meters above ground level, reaches the remarkable height of 20.70 meters while its diameter at the base measures 8.25 meters.

All the interior surfaces of the chapel are entirely covered with frescoes by various painters who depicted, embedded in geometric patterns, figures of saints, prophets, angels and allegorical representations.

=== Pictorial cycle ===
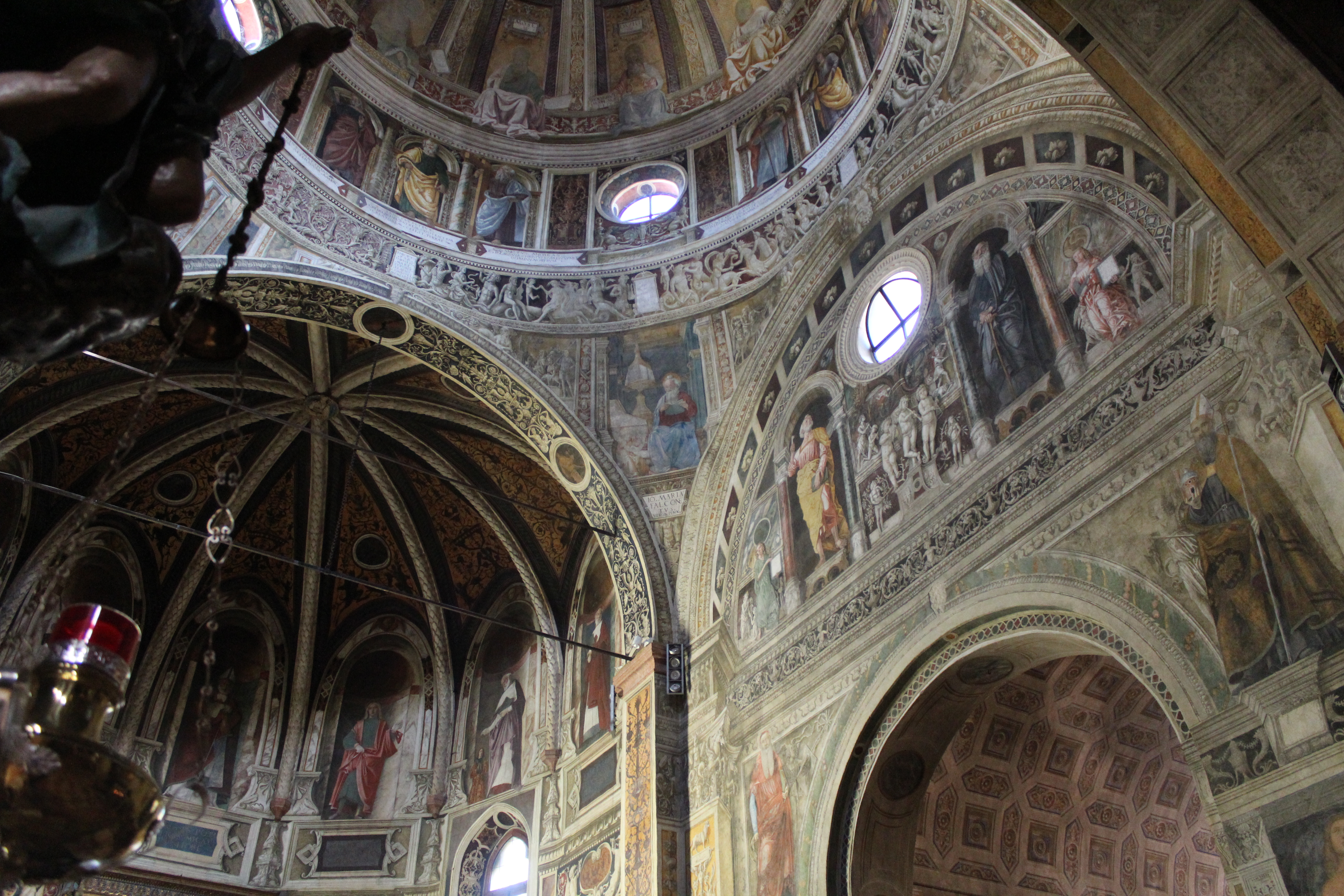
Part of the cubic structure, drum and dome

Frescoes by different authors totally cover the walls of the chapel, leaving no portion free. Each part of the decoration was made with successive completions: in lime tempera, organic technique and mixed techniques; laying of golden wax tablets for the outlines of the paintings and round tablets to imitate golden skies, all on the engraved cardboard support with dusting and drawing with a fine brush.

The exterior façade of the triumphal arch of entry into the chapel is entirely occupied by the depiction of decorative elements, while inside Cavazzola painted, in 1514, the Annunciation and on the sides St. Blaise and St. Zeno within panels.

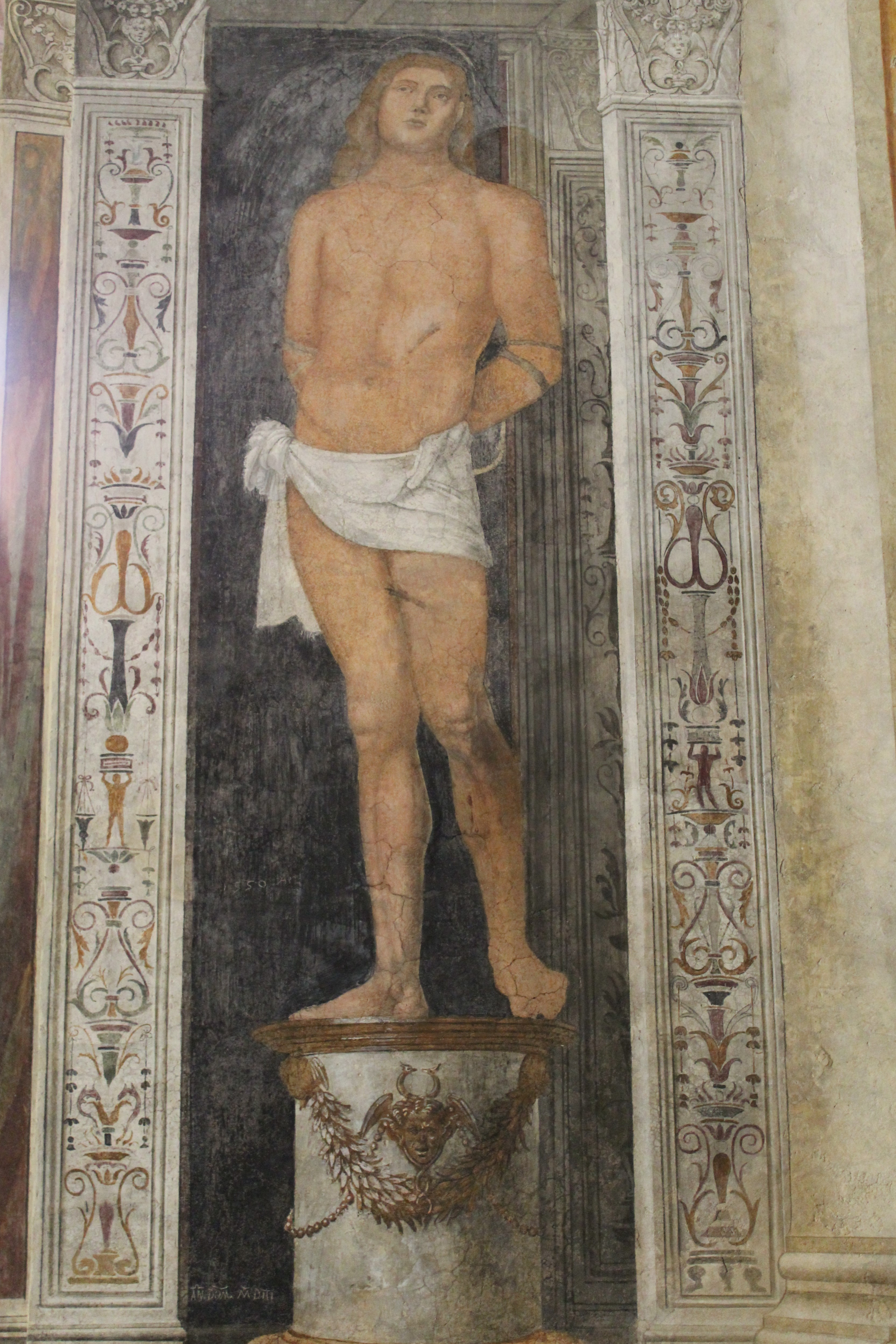
Saint Sebastian painted by Falconetto, detail of the right wall

On the other hand, the painter Gian Maria Falconetto, assisted by some of his pupils, is the author of most of the paintings that adorn the surfaces of the cubic structure, drum and dome, which he worked on between 1497 and 1499. The young Veronese fresco painter certainly took inspiration from his skills as an architect, since his work is characterized by the depiction of numerous architectural elements, such as cornices, niches, cartouches, pilasters and arches, which he used abundantly to divide the space geometrically within which to insert figures of saints, prophets and allegories.

On the right side of the chapel he depicted above, to the right and left respectively, St. Peter and St. Anthony Abbot placed inside niches and between them in the center, three putti musicians, while to the sides are two angels. Below and around the entrance to the right side chapel (known as the Gaio chapel), on the other hand, are depicted St. Roch on the left and St. Sebastian on the right. The decoration of the left side, on the other hand, was mainly taken care of by pupils from the Falconetto workshop; among the various depictions that can be mentioned are those of St. Blaise, St. Dominic, Pope Callixtus I, St. Peter and St. Paul.

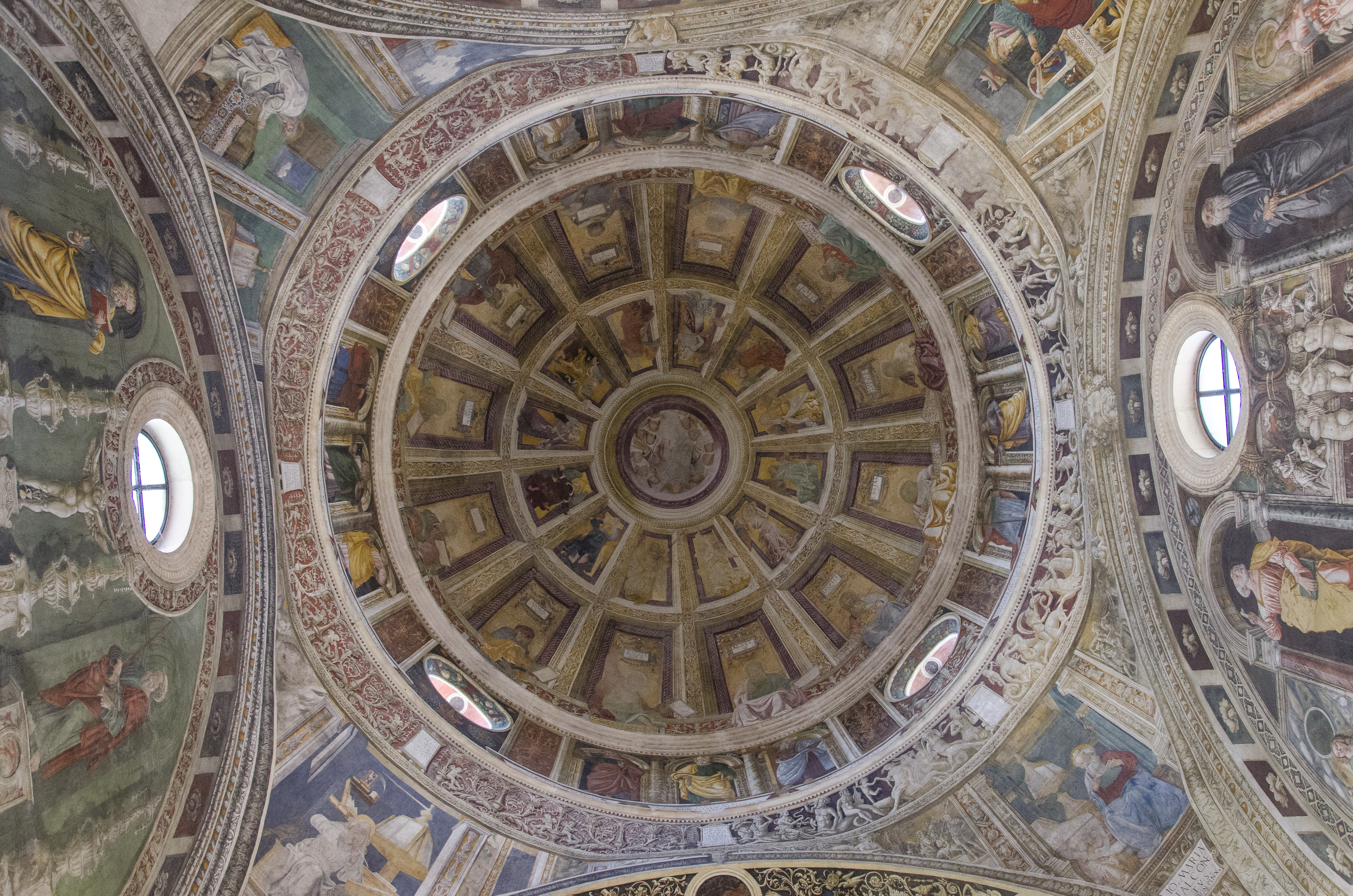
Dome of the chapel

The drum of the dome above the base is set by 4 spandrels in which Falconetto depicted the four evangelists. In turn, the drum is divided into four sectors in each of which there is the figure of three apostles or saints; starting from the sector above the entrance triumphal arch and proceeding to the right, one encounters: St. Matthias, St. Peter, St. Andrew of the Cross, St. Thomas the Apostle, St. John, St. John of Nepomuk, St. Matthew, St. Simon, St. Adeodatus, St. James, St. Philip, and St. Bartholomew. Finally, on the dome are figures of prophets with angels and, on the small dome, the Eternal Father in the act of blessing.

=== Right side chapel (known as the “Gaio” chapel) ===
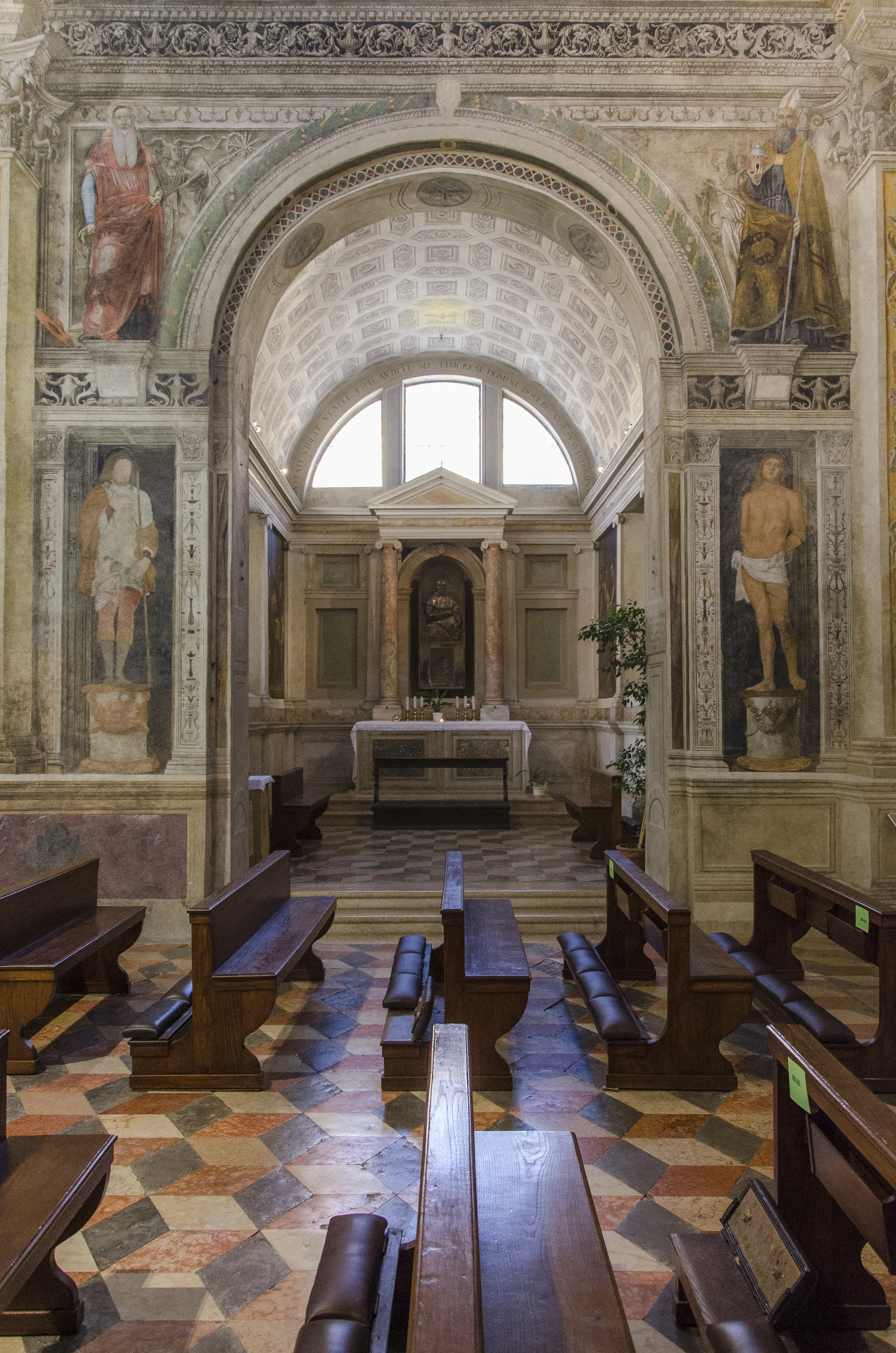
Gaio Chapel

A small chapel dedicated to the Blessed Virgin and St. Pius X is located on the right side, the result of an enlargement of an earlier "Gaio chapel" and now also known as the "Chapel of Blessed Zefirino Agostino," pastor of the church between 1854 and 1896. Architecturally rather simple, it has a barrel vault and on the sides four frames carved into the walls that house paintings attributed to the painter Jacopo Palma il Giovane in which he depicted scenes from the childhood of Christ and more specifically the Nativity, the Circumcision, and the Presentation in the Temple; in the fourth frame was supposed to be the Visitation of the Magi but has been lost. In place of the latter, in front of the Nativity, there was an altarpiece signed by Simone Brentana and dated 1703, in which the author depicted Our Lady in Glory with a devout saint.

=== Left side chapel (called the “Britti” chapel) ===
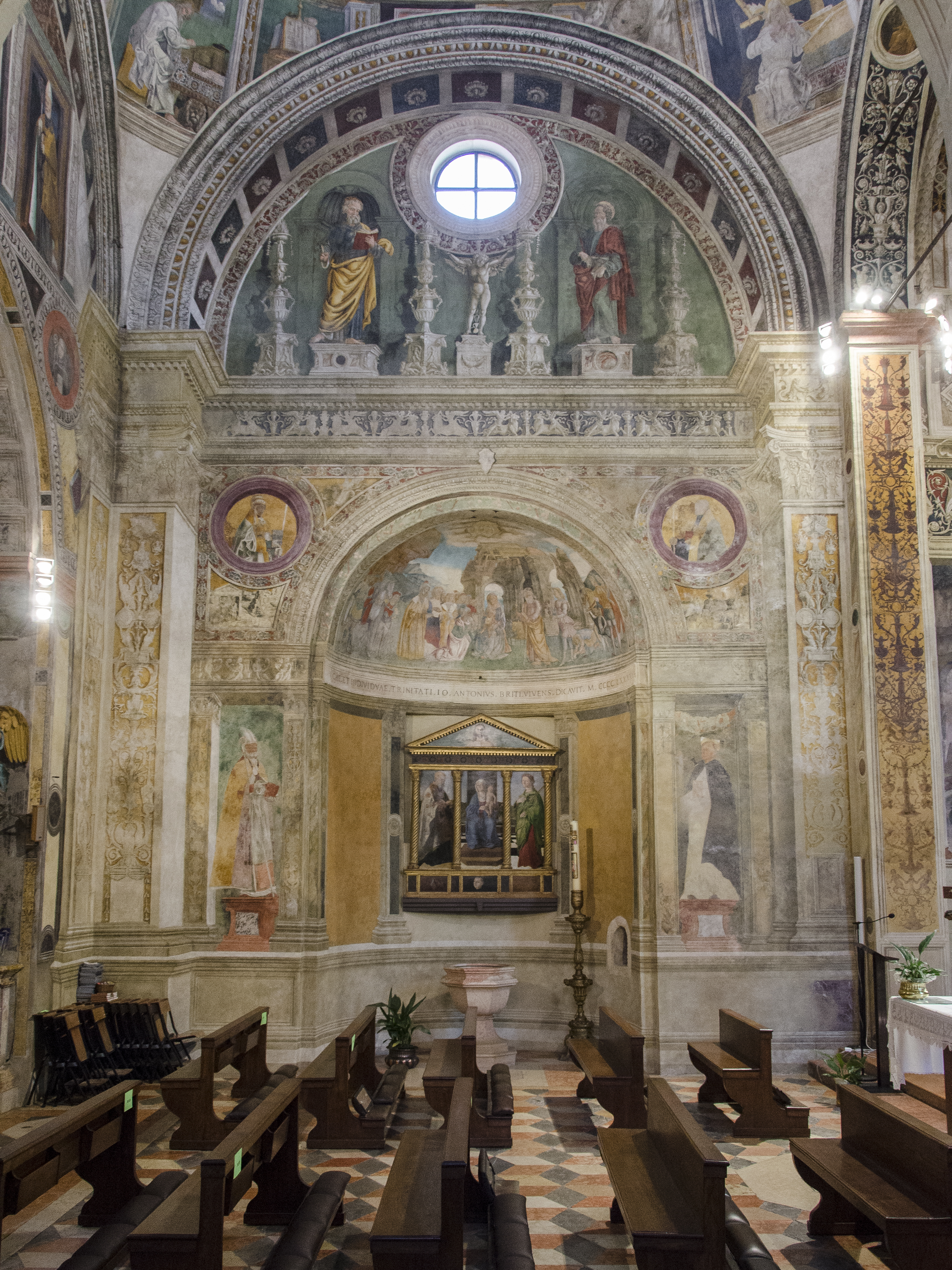
Britti chapel with a triptych by Girolamo Mocetto.

On the left side of the chapel is a small niche, also known as the "Britti Chapel"; many of Falconetto's pupils participated in the decoration of this one, including Mastro Zuan Giacomo, who was entrusted with the creation of the Adoration of the Magi fresco for the semi-dome, while Domenico Morone is the author of part of the frescoes in the small dome. On the other hand, the triptych, dated 1517 and signed by Girolamo Mocetto, depicts Our Lady and the Child, St. Benedict and St. Justina, and in its predella the portrait, initials and coat of arms of Gianfrancesco Renier, who died in 1517 and probably financed the chapel's construction. Resting on the floor is a 17th-century funerary ark made of tuff.

=== Apse ===
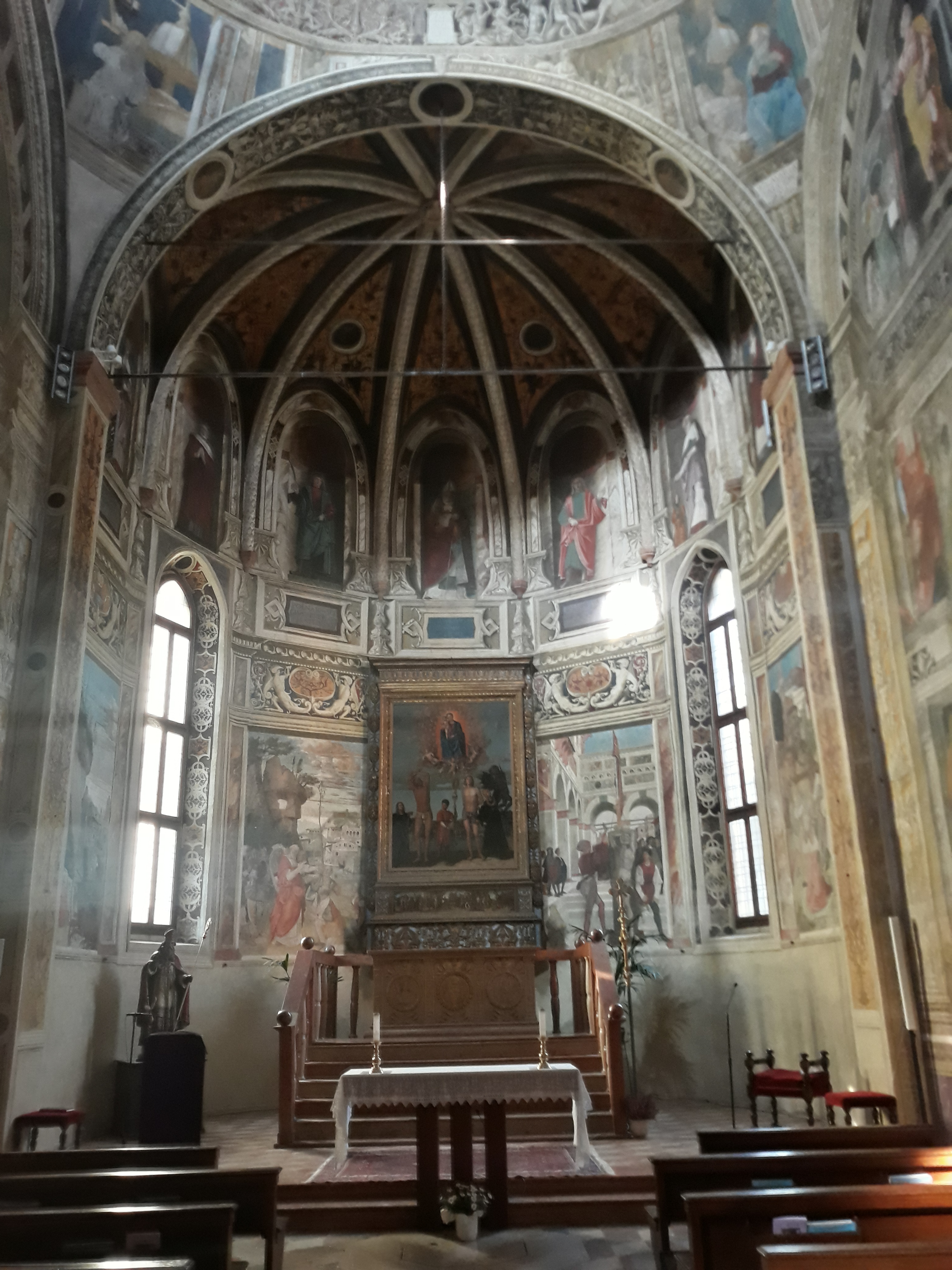
Apse with the altarpiece by Francesco Bonsignori

The chapel ends in a polygonal apse composed of seven sides on two of which a trilobed monofora is located; it is accessed by two steps. The semi-dome continues the layout of the walls by its division into seven segments divided by a crease. Like the rest of the chapel, the apse is also entirely frescoed. At the bottom, four faces of the polygon accommodate as many paintings that are part of a pictorial cycle, the work of Bartolomeo Cincani (known as Montagna) in which he depicted Scenes from the Life of Saint Blaise and more precisely, from right to left, Blessing of the Animals, Arrest, Torture, and Beheading. In these paintings, made between 1504 and 1507, the author demonstrated his connections with the Veronese school of painting without, however, denying his approach to the art of Antonello da Messina, which was a source of inspiration for him (of particular note are the similarities to the St. Sebastian in the Gemäldegalerie Alte Meister in Dresden).

The cycle is surmounted by a painted frieze with decorations and arabesques and above it four cartouches with the following inscriptions, starting from the left: “POENAR SOCIUS PUER TENELLUS,” “ALTER TU SOCIUS PUER MISELLE,” “ERECTUS GRADITUR BLASIUS PER UNDAS,” and “IMMITE BLASIUS FUGIT TYRANNU.” Finally, all the seven segments of the semi-dome are frescoed, below with Figures of Seven Saints, a work attributed to Domenico Morone, and above with decorated triangles.

In the center of the apse is the altarpiece by Francesco Bonsignori, who wanted to depict Madonna in Glory and Saints Juliana, Sebastian and Blaise, which was commissioned on July 20, 1514; it arrived, however, in Verona only five years later and after the author's death. The painting is set in a valuable frame dating back to 1526 made by a certain “Piero intagiador che sta sul corso,” which was later gilded and burnished by Girolamo and Callisto dai Libri. Girolamo is also the author of the related predella in which he depicted the miracle of St. Blaise, the martyrdom of St. Sebastian and the beheading of St. Juliana. The stepped altar, which has contained the relics of St. Blaise and St. Justina since 1508, is the work of Bernardino Panteo.

== See also ==
- Santi Nazaro e Celso, Verona
- Churches of Verona
- Roman Catholic Diocese of Verona
- Monuments of Verona

== Bibliography ==
- Dal Forno, Federico (1982). La Chiesa dei SS. Nazaro e Celso [The Church of Sts. Nazarius and Celsus] (in Italian). Verona: Fiorini.
- Tessari, Umberto Gaetano (1958). La chiesa di San Nazaro [The Church of St. Nazarius] (in Italian). Verona: Vita Veronese.
