= Santa Maria in Vanzo, Padua =

Roman Catholic Church in Padua, Italy

Coordinates: 45°24′03.98″N 11°52′22.63″E

Santa Maria in Vanzo
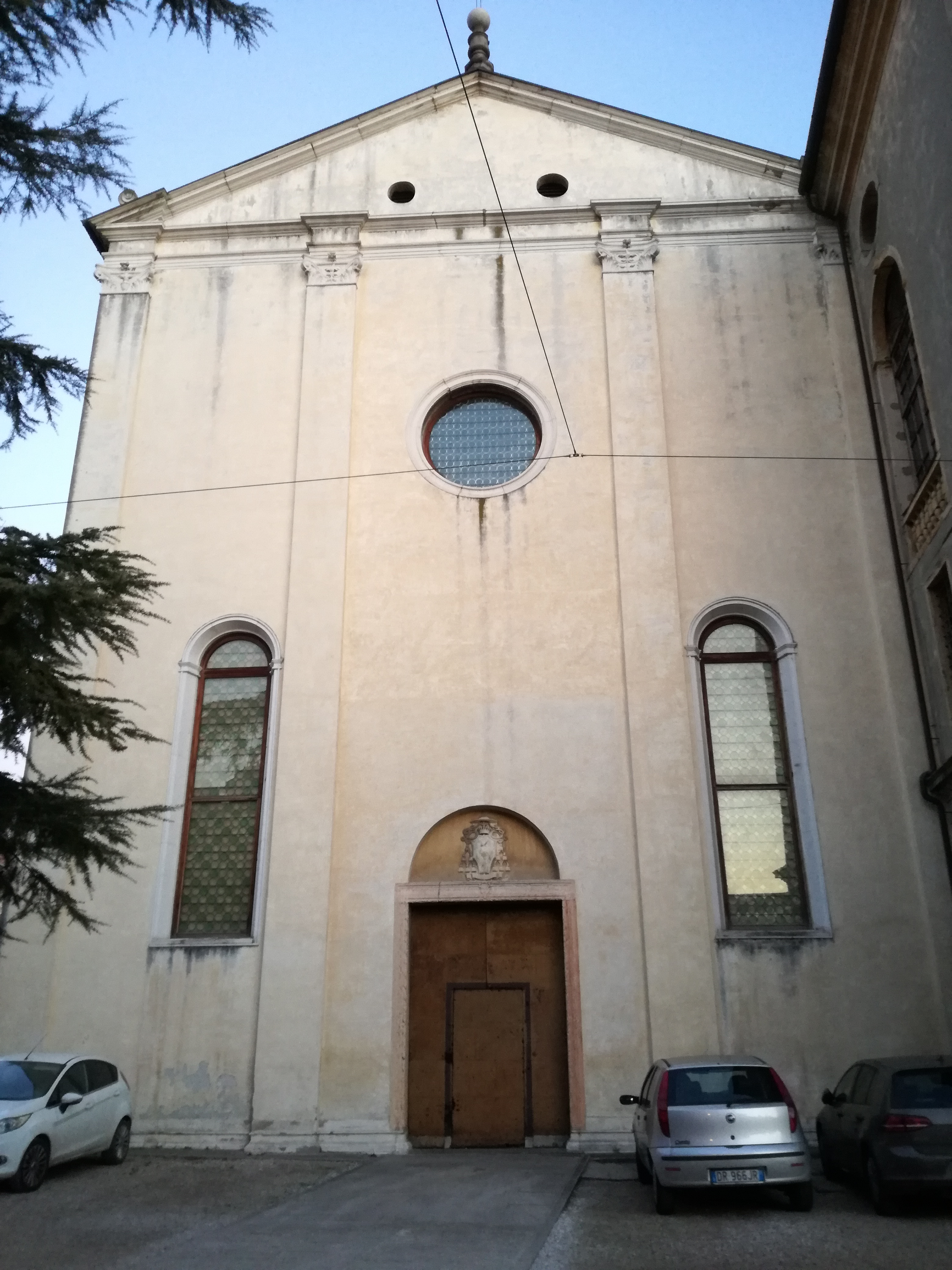
- Main entrance to Santa Maria in Vanzo

Religion
- Affiliation: Roman Catholic
- Diocese: Diocese of Padua
- Province: Veneto
- Rite: Roman Catholic, Western rite
- Year consecrated: 1181

Location
- Location: Padova Padova - Stemma.png
- Interactive map of Santa Maria in Vanzo

Architecture
- Type: Church
- Style: Renaissance
- Completed: 1436
- Direction of façade: N

Santa Maria in Vanzo is a Renaissance-style, Roman Catholic church in Padua, region of Veneto, Italy.

== History ==
The church was first rebuilt in 1436 by Domenico Campolongo, a local aristocrat; the church was enlarged in 1525.

An inventory in 1869 noted that the first altar on the left had a canvas depicting Enthroned Virgin and St Jerome among other Saints by Lambert Sustris. The fourth altar on the left had an Adoration by the Shepherds attributed by Pietro Selvatico to Francesco Bassano the Younger. The main chapel had an Enthroned Madonna and child with Saints Peter, Paul, John the Baptist, and Catherine, as well as two musician angels by Bartolomeo Montagna. In the apse was a fresco depicting the Coronation of the Virgin with the Evangelists and Saints. The altar to the left of the main chapel had a Christ being entombed with Joseph of Aramethea and the Virgin (1624) by Jacopo Bassano. The last altar to the right, there was a canvas depicting the Baptism of Christ (1528–1531) attributed to Domenico Campagnola. The transept has frescoes depicting Virtues, and Evangelists in spandrels of the transept by Domenico Campagnola. Other artists in the church are Girolamo dal Santo in the frescoes in the choir and apse depicting God the Eternal, symbols of the evangelists and the prophets. Other works include:

- Altarpiece with Blessed Gregorio Barbarigo recommending the Trinity to nine Seminarians by Francesco Zanoni
- Presbytery frescoes (1949) by Armando and Galliano Miglioraro
- Crucifixion by Michele da Verona.
- Pope Sarto blesses Missionaries (1956) by Luigi Tito
- Seven Holy Virgins attributed to Alessandro Maganza
- Conversation of Saints by Antonio Vassillacchi
- Adoration of the Magi by Giovanni del Mio.
