= Michele da Verona =

Italian painter

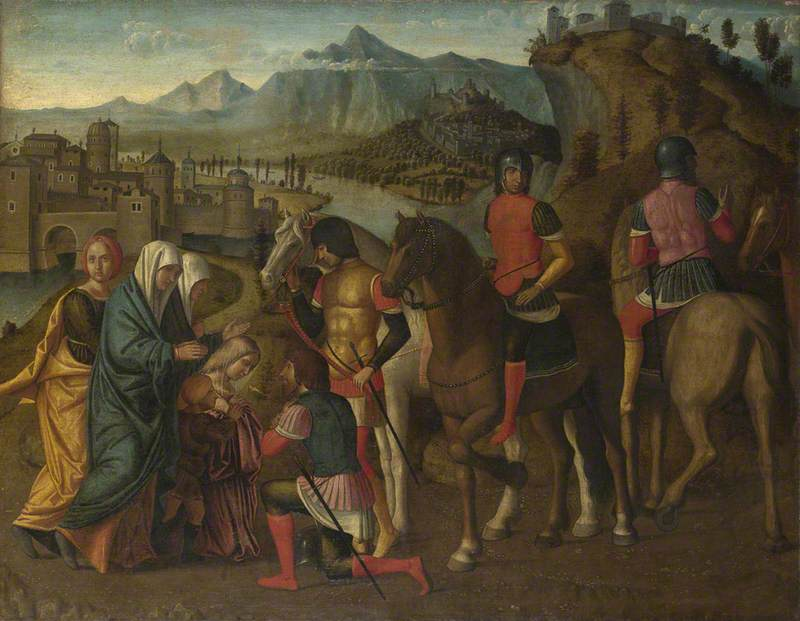
- Coriolanus persuaded by his Family to spare Rome, National Gallery, London
- Born: Michele di Zenone, called Michele da Verona; 1470; Verona, Italy
- Died: 1536/1544; Verona, Italy
- Other names: Michele da Verona
- Occupation: Painter
- Known for: Paintings

Michele da Verona (Michele di Zenone) (1470, in Verona – 1536/1544) was an Italian painter of the Renaissance period. He is different but a near contemporary of Zenone Veronese (1484 -1542).

== Biography ==
He was born between 1469 and 1470, probably in Sommacampagna, in the Veronese region, to the wool combing artist Zenone di Gaspare, a native of that small village who moved to the Veronese district of S. Zeno di Sopra by 1473. He was a contemporary of Paolo Moranda Cavazzola, and may have assisted him in the decorative work for San Bernardino in Verona. Inside the portal of San Stefano, Milan, is a large Crucifixion signed by him in 1500, and formerly in the Refectory of San Giorgio in Verona. The same subject, dated by him in 1505, is in Santa Maria in Vanzo, Padua. In both pictures there is an imitation of the manner of Jacopo Bellini. In the church of Santa Chiara, Verona, are frescoes representing the Eternal, with Angels, Prophets, and the four Evangelists, dated 1509. Frescoes of later dates exist in the churches of Vittoria Nuova and Sant' Anastasia; while in the church of Villa di Villa, near Este, is a Madonna and Child, between SS. John the Baptist, Lawrence, Andrew, and Peter dated 1523.

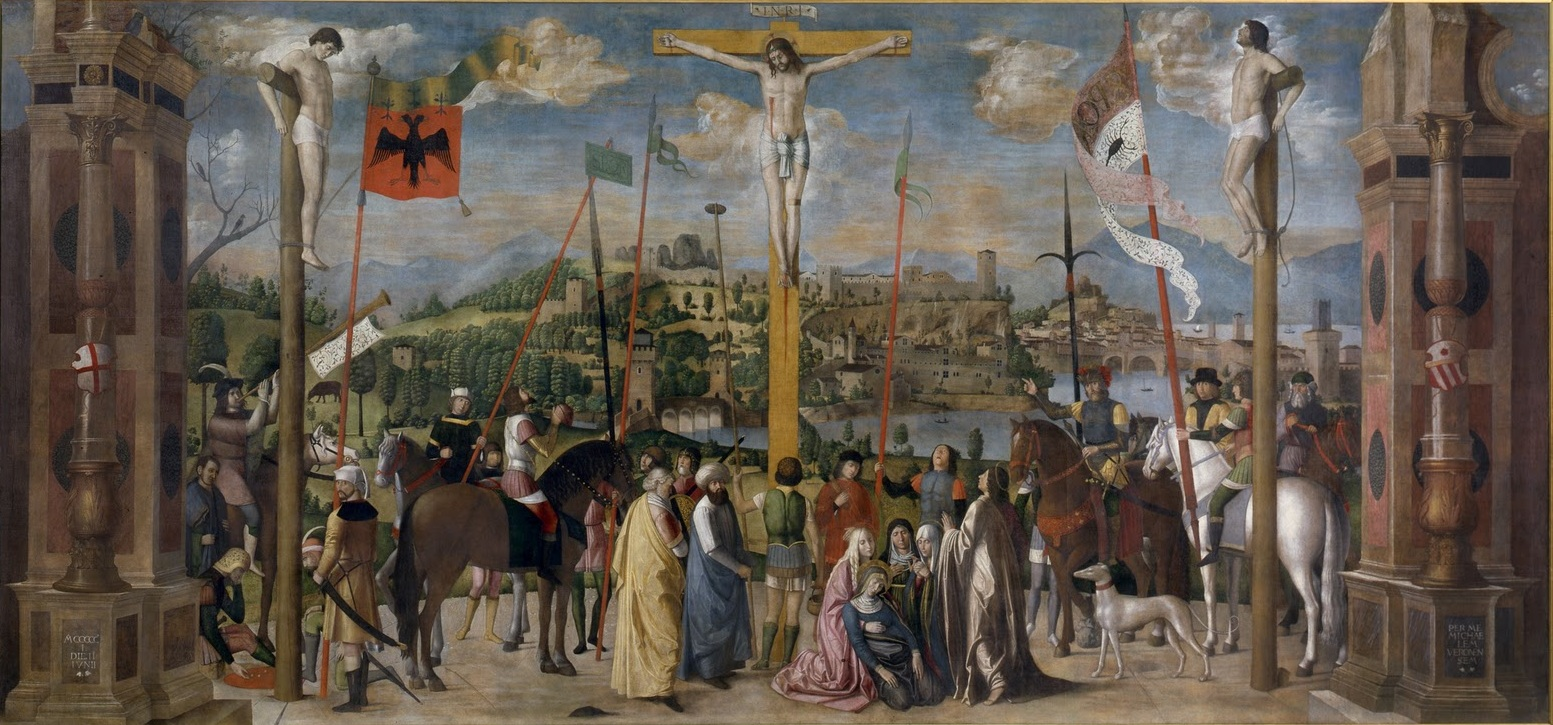
Crucifixion (circa 1500), Milan, Accademia di Brera

Information on his artistic activity is scarce and is mainly derived from a small group of signed and dated works. An isolated document attests that in October 1497, Michele da Verona was commissioned to estimate, together with his colleague Pietro Badile, a work by master painter Giacomo from San Zeno . In 1501 he signed and dated what is considered his masterpiece: the Crucifixion for the monastery of San Giorgio in Braida in Verona (since 1811 in Milan, Accademia di Brera), held by the canons regular of the Congregation of San Giorgio in Alga.

He died in Verona probably between May and June 1536. He left legacies to his daughters Giacoma and Apollonia and appointed Ludovico as his universal heir.
