= Santa Maria in Organo, Verona =

Church in Verona, Italy

Coordinates: 45°26′49″N 11°0′10″E

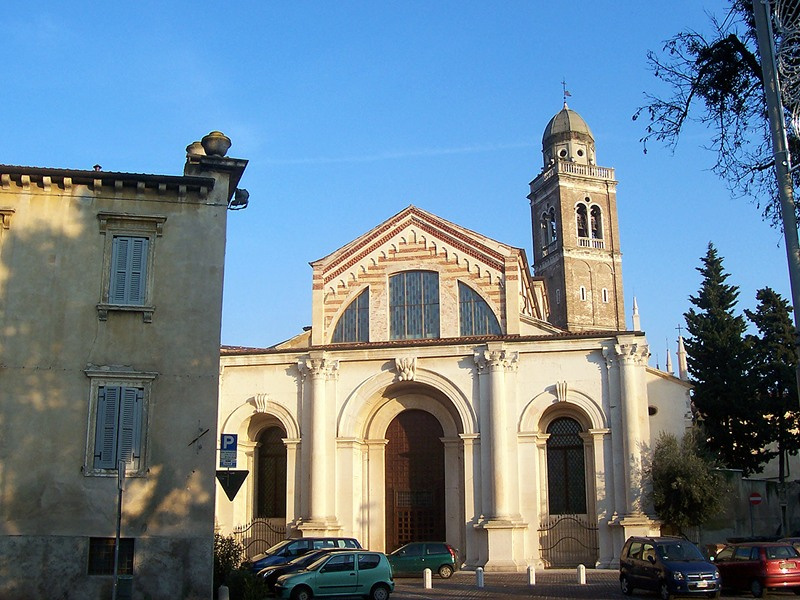
Facade and bell tower of Santa Maria in Organo.

Santa Maria in Organo is a Roman Catholic church in Verona, Northern Italy.

== History ==
The church's origin dates to the 6th–8th century, at the time of the Ostrogoth and Lombard dominations in Italy. The original convent was destroyed in Napoleonic times. The church was rebuilt after an earthquake in 1117. It once faced a branch of the Adige River, now grounded.

From the 14th century it was a parish depending from the Patriarchate of Aquileia, to which it belonged until its dissolution in 1756. In 1444 it was sold the Olivetan Benedictins, who held it until 1808. The monk Giovanni da Verona executed the tarsias of the wooden choir, and designed the bell tower, finished in 1533. In 1534 five bells were cast in the scale of F, the first peal in Italy. They are rung with Veronese bellringing art.

Starting from 1547 a Romanesque-Gothic façade, in white marble, was begun, designed by Michele Sanmicheli; this has remained unfinished. Among the other possessions, the Abbey held the church of Santa Maria Maggiore of Gazzo Veronese.

== Interior ==
The interior is on the Latin cross plan, with a nave and two aisles. It houses a rich collection of paintings, with works by Girolamo Savoldo, Domenico Morone, Francesco Morone, Antonio Balestra and Guercino among the others.

Under the presbytery is the crypt, a relic of the High Middle Ages edifice. The columns maintain the 8th-century capitals. It has works by Luca Giordano, Francesco Morone, and Antonio Balestra, along with the popular Muletta, a wooden sculpture from the 14th century, which depicts Jesus entering Jerusalem riding a mule.

== See also ==
- Trivulzio Madonna, a painting by Andrea Mantegna once in the church
