= Giovanni Francesco Caroto =

Italian painter

Giovan Francesco Caroto
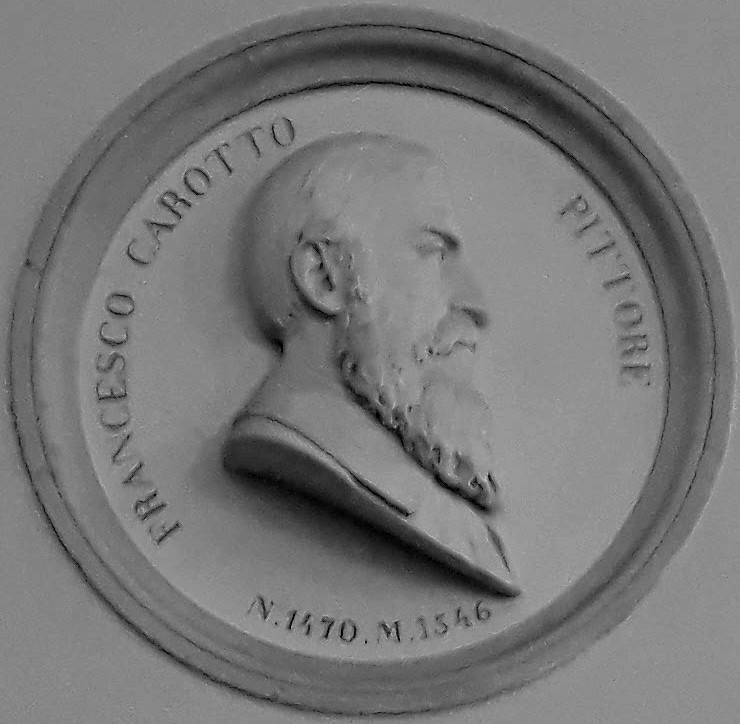
- Nineteenth-century effigy depicting Giovan Francesco Caroto (spelled “Carotto”) preserved in the bust gallery of the Verona Civic Library, created by Grazioso Spazzi.
- Born: C. 1480; Verona
- Died: 1555; Verona
- Occupation: Painter

Giovan Francesco Caroto (Verona, c. 1480 – Verona, 1555) was an Italian painter.

A pupil of Liberale da Verona, following his travels to Mantua and, especially, to Casale Monferrato, Giovan Francesco Caroto gradually moved away from the tradition of the Veronese school of painting to embrace the various artistic currents that were prominent at the time, drawing inspiration from Mantegna, Raphael, Bernardino Luini, and Bramantino. In turn, his art influenced many Veronese painters, such as Francesco Morone and Francesco Torbido.

His works are now preserved worldwide, particularly at the Castelvecchio Museum in Verona. It is in this museum that his most famous painting, Portrait of a Child with a Drawing, is displayed, which, due to the originality of its subject, is almost a unicum in the artistic landscape of his century. Other works are found in churches in his hometown, such as San Giorgio in Braida and San Fermo Maggiore, as well as in other cities such as Florence, Modena, Budapest, and Prague. His remains rest in the Santa Maria in Organo church in Verona, alongside those of his brother Giovanni, in the San Nicolò chapel, which, as Vasari recounts, "he had adorned with his paintings."

== Biography ==
=== Childhood and family ===
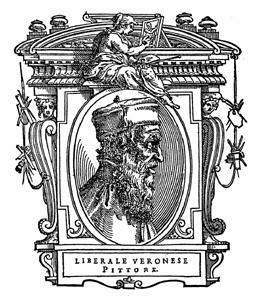
Liberale da Verona, Giovan Francesco Caroto's first master. Illustration from Le Vite by Giorgio Vasari, in the 1568 edition.

Giovan Francesco Caroto was born in Verona to a family believed to have originated from Caravaggio, which had settled on the banks of the Adige several years earlier. This is suggested by a petition submitted on February 3, 1499, by the painter’s uncle, Don Stefano di fu Berin Baschi da Caravaggio, a chaplain of Santa Maria in Organo, requesting Veronese citizenship, as he had been living there for many years. Subsequently, the father, Pietro Baschi, abandoned the original surname in favor of Caroto, likely due to the apothecary shop he owned in Piazza delle Erbe, whose sign bore the word "Caro" or "Charo".

The older brother of Giovanni Caroto, also a painter, his exact date of birth is uncertain due to inconsistencies in tax records and other documents. A 1508 document refers to him as "an eminent painter, son of the late Ser Pietro da Caravaggio, who has lived in Verona with his family for twenty-six years and more...". The generally accepted birth year of 1480 is thus an average derived from various records: 1478, 1479, and 1482.

According to Giorgio Vasari in Le Vite, after abandoning his studies in the liberal arts, Giovan Francesco became a pupil of the painter Liberale da Verona (Note: Vasari writes: "...after having been taught the first rudiments of learning, he was induced, by his inclination for painting, to abandon the further study of letters, and to place himself with the Veronese Liberate, for the purpose of acquiring the art of the limner, promising to remunerate the master for his pains. Though still very young, Giovanni Francesco then devoted himself with so much love and diligence to design, that in that particular, as well as in the use of colours, his services were of great value to Liberate, even in the first years of his career." Giorgio Vasari, The Lives of the Most Excellent Painters, Sculptors, and Architects.) alongside companions Antonio da Vendri and Nicola Giolfino. In Liberale’s workshop, he learned a vibrant and intense use of color and the ability to depict a luminosity with a certain softness, stylistic elements that would persist throughout his career, despite his continuous tendency to diverge from the Veronese school of painting and embrace the diverse artistic currents he encountered during his numerous travels in northern Italy.

=== Early years in Verona and Mantua ===
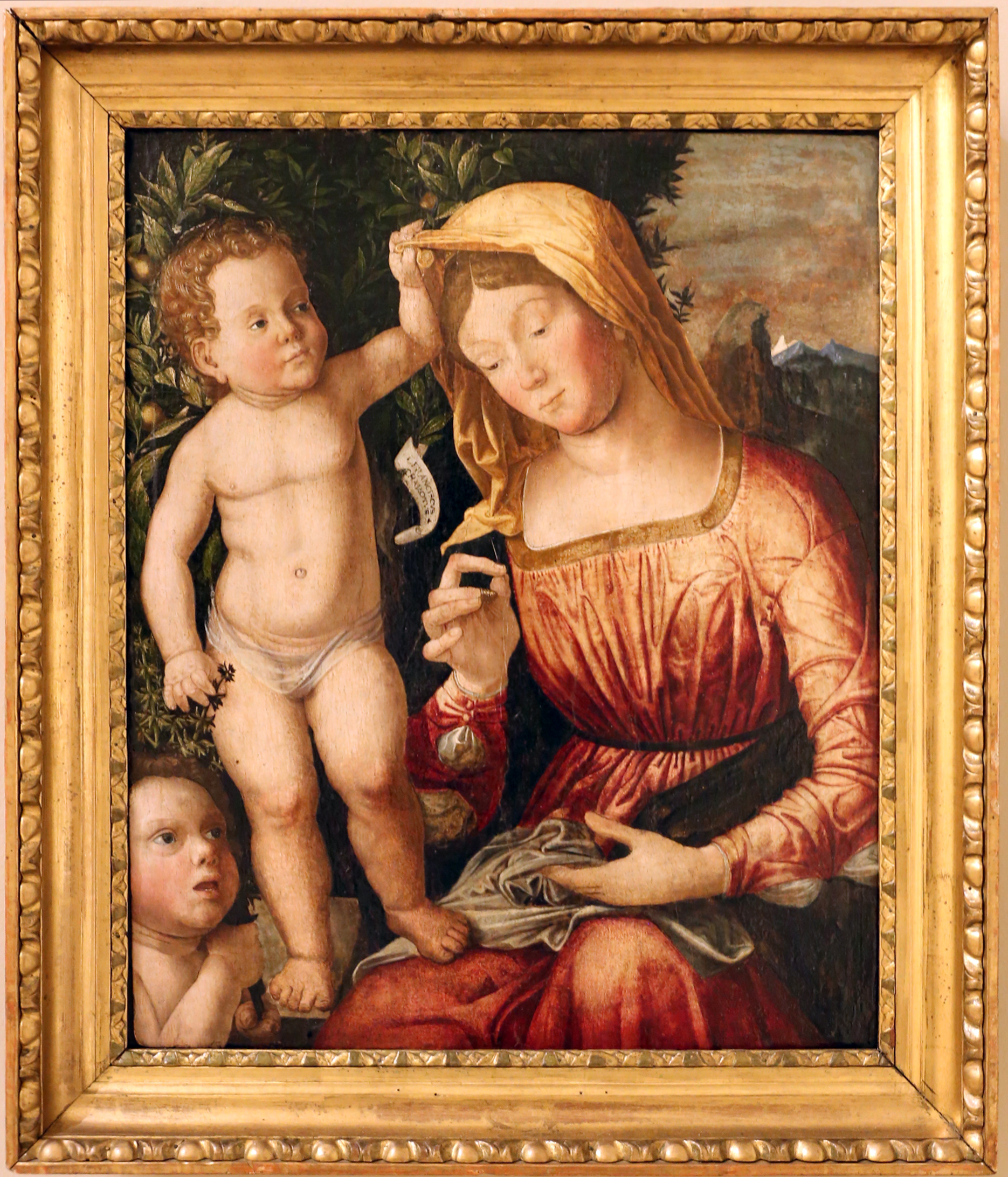
Giovan Francesco Caroto, Madonna with child and Saint John, 1501, oil on panel, 48×39 cm, Modena, Galleria Estense. The first work by Caroto that can be definitively attributed to him.

The first painting definitively attributed to Giovan Francesco is the Madonna with child and Saint John, created in 1501 (signed and dated "J Franciscus Charotus MCCCCCI"), now housed at the Galleria Estense. In this work, particularly in the figure of the Virgin, a clear inspiration from the style of the renowned painter Andrea Mantegna is evident. It is believed that Mantegna may have frequented Liberale’s workshop during his stay in Verona while working on the altarpiece for the Santa Maria in Organo church. Caroto was likely deeply impressed by the Paduan painter, following him to nearby Mantua, where Mantegna was active, though never joining his workshop, preferring to work independently. In the city of the Gonzaga family, Giovan Francesco encountered the great interpreters of Renaissance art from the Mantuan school, such as Lorenzo Costa the Elder, and was not unaffected by the works of a young Correggio. Regarding the Madonna with child and Saint John, there exists a variant, also signed by Caroto but undated, displayed at the Gallerie dell'Accademia in Venice. This variant was once considered part of Caroto's early work. However, recent scholarship tends to date it later, given the influence of Lorenzo Lotto and Andrea Previtali, whose styles Caroto encountered in his later years.

By 1502, Caroto’s artistic activity was well-established, as he was engaged in creating a canvas depicting Saints Catherine, Sebastian, and Roch for the high altar of the Santa Caterina church at Ognissanti in Verona (a building no longer extant), a work now lost. A tax record from the Santa Maria in Organo district, compiled in the same year, lists him as a pictor, suggesting he was already running his own workshop. From this point, biographical traces of Giovan Francesco are lost until 1508; a notarial act informs us that by that year, he had become a widower following the death of his wife, the daughter of Baldassarre Gandoni, who died during the birth of their son Bernardino. This tragic event likely prompted him to travel to Milan (around 1507) to study the style of Lombard Renaissance, where he stayed for about two years, returning frequently throughout his life.

In 1508, several of his works are documented: the Adoration of the Child, now displayed at the Castelvecchio Museum in Verona, a Madonna now in Leipzig, and a fresco depicting the Annunciation for the San Gerolamo oratory in Verona (now the Archaeological Museum at the Roman Theatre); in all these works, the influence of the styles he absorbed during his time in Milan is evident. Already in these early works, Caroto’s disinterest in following the pictorial tradition of the Venetian school and Veronese school of painting is apparent, preferring to seek inspiration from other models and artists, such as the aforementioned Lorenzo Costa and Andrea Solari, demonstrating that his early interest in Mantegna’s style was only the beginning of a lifelong search that extended to various pictorial currents across much of the Italian peninsula. In the same years, he received a commission to repaint the walls of the Spolverini-Dal Verme chapel in the Sant'Eufemia church in Verona, where he depicted, in two superimposed bands, Stories of Tobias and Stories of the Archangel Raphael. For the same chapel, he also painted the altarpiece, now housed at the Castelvecchio civic museum, depicting the Three Archangels.

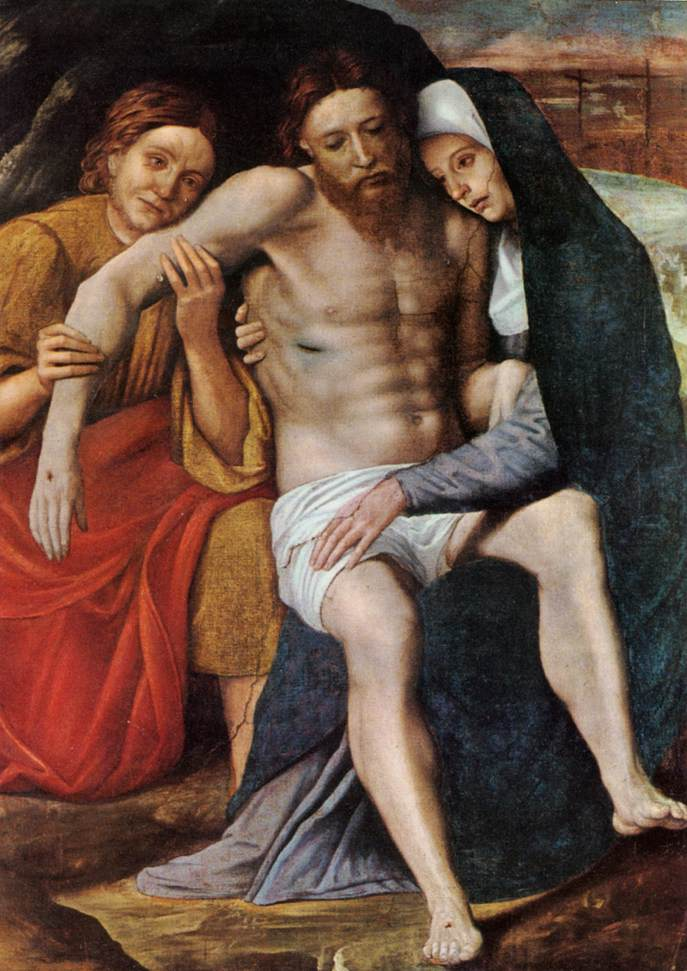
Giovan Francesco Caroto, Deposition of the Tears, oil on canvas, 129×98 cm, Verona, Castelvecchio Museum. According to historian Antonio Avena, the influences of the master Liberale da Verona are noticeable.

Some art historians attribute the altarpiece, The Archangel Michael and Saints Cosmas and Damian, in the apse of the Santa Maria della Carità church in Mantua, to Caroto’s early activity. However, opinions on this attribution are highly debated.

Of certain attribution, and far more significant for his career, is the aforementioned decoration of the extrados of the triumphal arch of the San Gerolamo oratory, which Vasari also mentions, signed by the Veronese painter with an inscription at the bottom: "A.D. M.D.V.III.I.F CAROTUS FA". In this work, Caroto reaches the highest stylistic levels of his art, creating a spiritual intimacy among the figures in the sacred scene through a successful choice of simplicity and sobriety in the entire pictorial composition. He was likely also the author of other frescoes in the San Gerolamo convent, though their poor condition today makes interpretation and attribution extremely challenging.

Around 1510, Giovan Francesco painted the predella Death, Funeral, and Burial of the Virgin, in which similarities with the themes of his master, Liberale da Verona, and with Mantegna’s series of canvases Triumphs of Caesar are evident.

His Stories of the Childhood of Christ, now housed at the Uffizi in Florence, painted on two panels, were possibly the shutters of the Magi altar in the San Cosimo church in Verona. On one side, he painted Two Shepherds Adoring and Saint Joseph, and on the other, the Circumcision. On the exterior, the work is completed by the Massacre of the Innocents and the Flight into Egypt. Regarding this work and the influence of Emilian culture on it, Vasari noted:

The first works which he executed after leaving Mantegna, were the folding-doors which close in the Altar of the Three Kings, in the church of the Hospital of San Cosimo, on which he depicted the Circumcision of Christ, the Flight into Egypt, and other figures [...]

— Giorgio Vasari, The Lives of the Most Excellent Painters, Sculptors, and Architects

According to art historian Dal Bravo, these panels can be dated around 1507 or attributed to the painter’s early works, thus serving as a foundation for his subsequent works. However, according to others such as Fiorio, the decorative elements in the Massacre, inspired by Bramante, suggest a later date, likely around 1511, when Caroto had already stayed in Milan and thus came into contact with circles related to Bramante’s work. Fiorio essentially dates this work to the period immediately before Giovan Francesco settled at the court of Marquis William IX of Montferrat.

=== Stay in Casale Monferrato ===
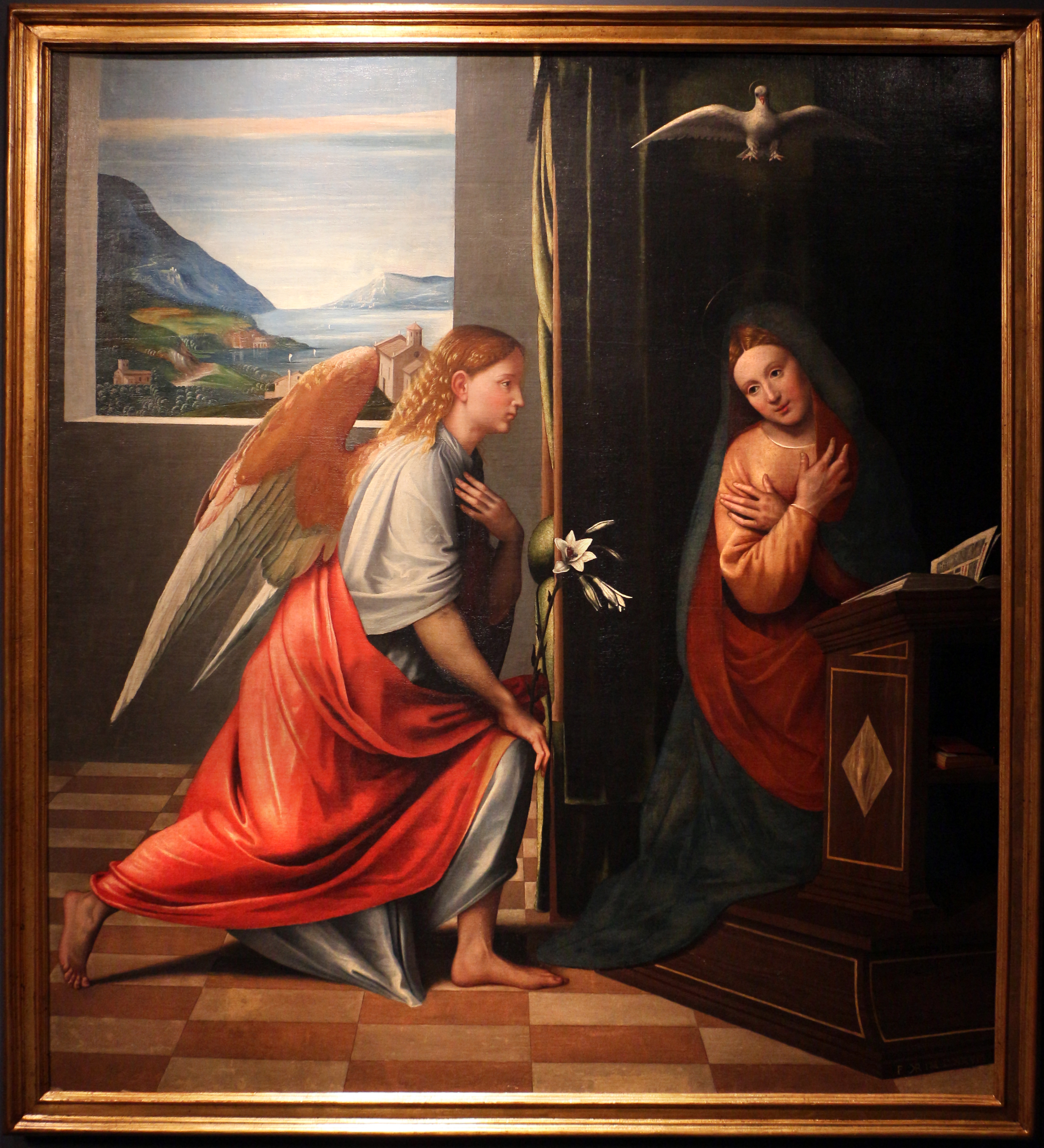
Giovan Francesco Caroto, Annunciation, 1528, oil on canvas, 170×160 cm, private collection. This work, later than the first stay in Casale, strongly recalls the Lombard style, particularly the composition of the homonymous painting by Andrea Solari.

The intermediate phase of the Veronese artist’s pictorial activity is undoubtedly linked to his interest in Lombard painting and is connected to his stay in Milan, as reported by Vasari. In the cosmopolitan environment of the man who became Count of Sesto Calende in 1514, he likely came into contact around this time with the art of the Leonardesque painters (particularly Bernardino Luini and Cesare da Sesto) and the Flemish painters, always highly popular in the Lombard capital. In the early 16th century, Milan was considered a major cultural and artistic center. Artists such as Vincenzo Foppa, Bergognone, Butinone, and Bramantino were active there. Attracted by such a vibrant artistic scene, Caroto settled there. While in Milan, Giovan Francesco was "called by William, Marquis of Montferrat," (Note: Vasari writes: "After having completed the works undertaken for the Visconti, Giovan Francesco, being invited by Guglielmo, Marquis of Montferrat, went very willingly to do him service, which he had been earnestly requested to do by the Visconti, and having arrived, a good provision was at once assigned to him." Giorgio Vasari, The Lives of the Most Excellent Painters, Sculptors, and Architects.) and from the following year, his residence was stably in Casale, as a guest of his patron William IX, where he remained for at least the next five years.

Little remains of his works in Lombard territory; it is known that he painted the chapel where the Marquis usually attended Mass, the church, and the San Domenico castle, but no trace remains, as both buildings were extensively remodeled over time. (Note: Vasari recounts: "For the apartments of the Castle also our artist afterwards painted many pictures which acquired him very great renown and in the church of San Domenico he painted the whole of the principal chapel, by command of the same Signor; those decorations being intended for the adornment of the sepulchre wherein the Marquis was ultimately to be laid." Giorgio Vasari, The Lives of the Most Excellent Painters, Sculptors, and Architects.) He devoted considerable attention to executing portraits of the ladies serving the Marchioness, as well as that of the family’s firstborn, as Vasari recounts:

Giovan Francesco took the portrait of the Marquis Guglielmo with that of his consort, and painted a vast number of pictures which were sent into France: he executed the portrait of their first-born son Guglielmo likewise, he being then but a child, with those of their daughters, and of all the ladies who were in the service of the Marchioness.

— Giorgio Vasari, The Lives of the Most Excellent Painters, Sculptors, and Architects

Regarding his skill as a portraitist, Vasari recounts an anecdote in which Giovan Francesco competed in Milan against a Flemish painter in a painting contest, ultimately losing only because, according to the Arezzo historian, the figure he chose was not as young and beautiful as that painted by his opponent.

From his stay in Casale, a canvas depicting the Deposition, dated 1515, has survived, now part of a private collection and considered one of the artist’s most significant works. Although critics note a qualitative decline compared to his earlier works, it reflects all the stylistic innovations Caroto encountered in those years, with notable references to Flemish painting and the sfumato of Leonardo da Vinci. These influences reappear later in many other works, particularly in his Saint John the Evangelist on Patmos, a work datable to the late second decade of the 16th century, now housed at the National Gallery in Prague.

It is likely, though not certain, that by 1518, following the death of William of Montferrat, Caroto returned to his hometown. However, thanks to documents uncovered by art historian Alessandro Baudi di Vesme, we know that he returned to Casale multiple times later in life, where he owned some land; his presence in Lombardy is certainly documented in 1523.

=== Return to Verona ===
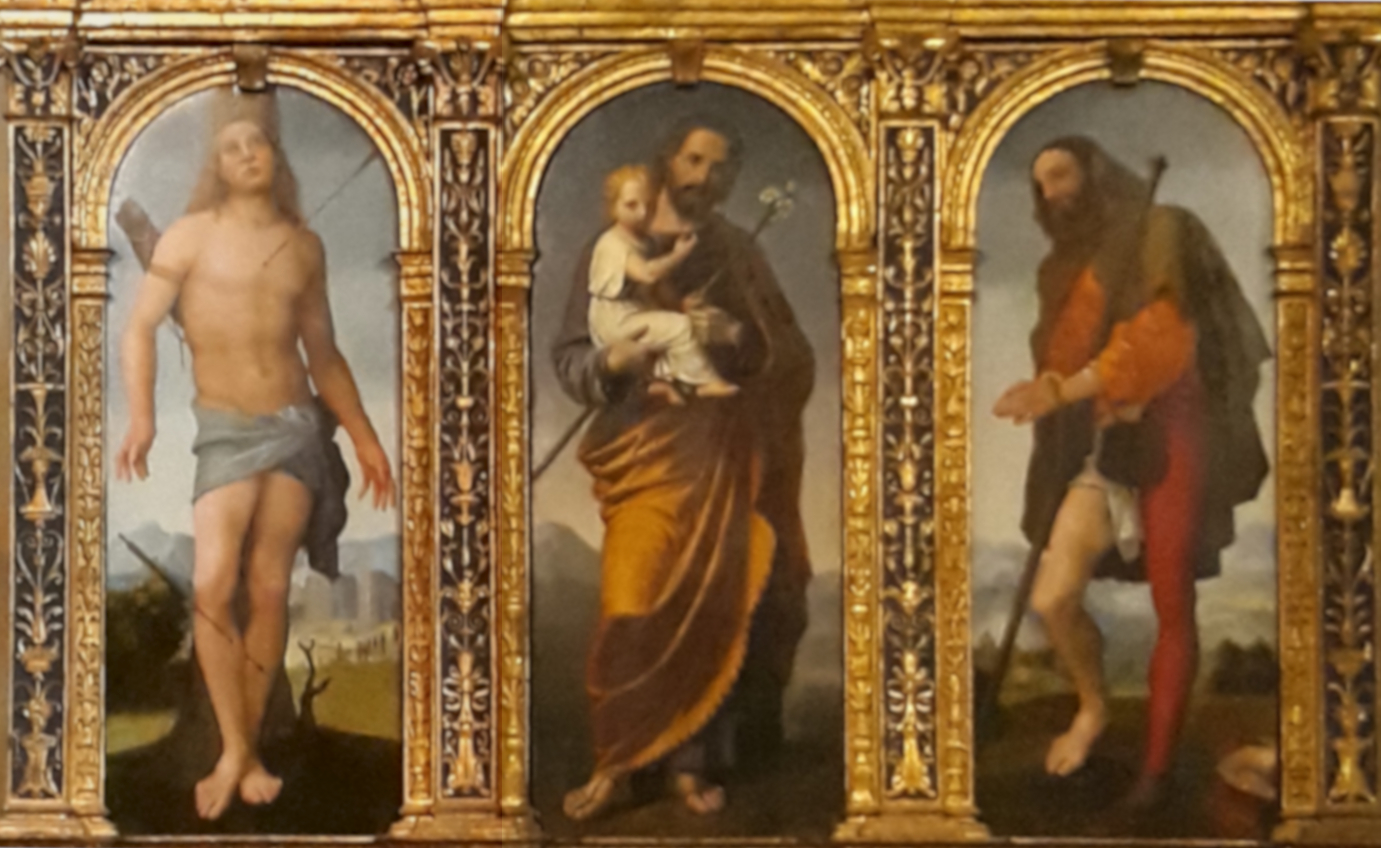
San Giorgio in Braida Polyptych, San Giorgio in Braida, Verona. By Caroto are the Saint Sebastian, left, oil on panel, 148×56 cm, and the Saint Roch, right, oil on panel, 148×56 cm. (Note: The central Saint Joseph is by the 19th-century painter Angelo Recchia. In Brugnoli (1954, p. 29).)

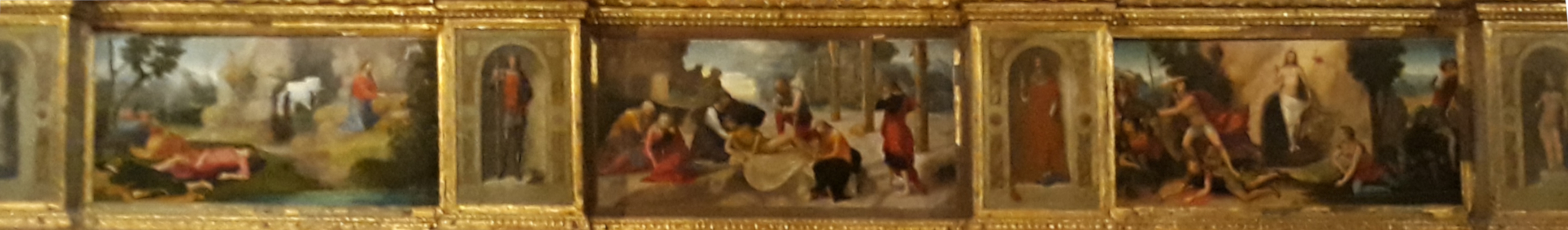
Predella of the aforementioned polyptych: Agony in the Garden, oil on panel, 26×54 cm; Deposition, oil on panel, 26×57 cm; Resurrection, oil on panel, 26×54 cm. San Giorgio in Braida, Verona. Work by Caroto.

Upon returning to his hometown, he "arranged his affairs and those of his son, to whom he then gave a wife, and it was then found that his riches amounted to more than seven thousand ducats." However, this newfound wealth did not lead him to abandon painting; "rather, he devoted himself thereto with more devotion than ever, having his mind at peace, and not being compelled to distract his thoughts with cares for his subsistence." One of the first works created after his return to Verona is a polyptych for a side altar in the San Giorgio in Braida church. Of this polyptych, his are the Saint Roch on the left, the Saint Sebastian on the right, the lunette with the Transfiguration, and the lower predella comprising the Agony in the Garden, Deposition, and Resurrection. The other two paintings adorning it are attributed to Felice Brusasorzi and Angelo Recchia. In this work, Giovan Francesco showcases the best of what he learned during his Lombard stays studying Leonardesque styles, creating one of his most stylistically elevated works. The sfumato, achieved through multiple layers of glazes and color, lends a melancholic expression to the two saints, creating a "subtle cultural interplay" between the styles of Bramantino and Costa.

His painting of Saint Catherine of Alexandria, which was painted for the Church of Madonna di Campagna (a late work by the renowned architect Michele Sanmicheli) and is now preserved in the Castelvecchio Museum, probably dates from this period. This painting particularly showcases the influences of Lombard painting, a characteristic that continued to be nurtured through his frequent trips to Casale. Specifically, the style recalls that of the followers of Raphael, who multiplied in the Milanese area after Luini’s return from Rome. Additionally, the posture and demeanor of Saint Catherine recall the Saint Barbara by Boltraffio and the physiognomy of Leonardo da Vinci’s paintings.

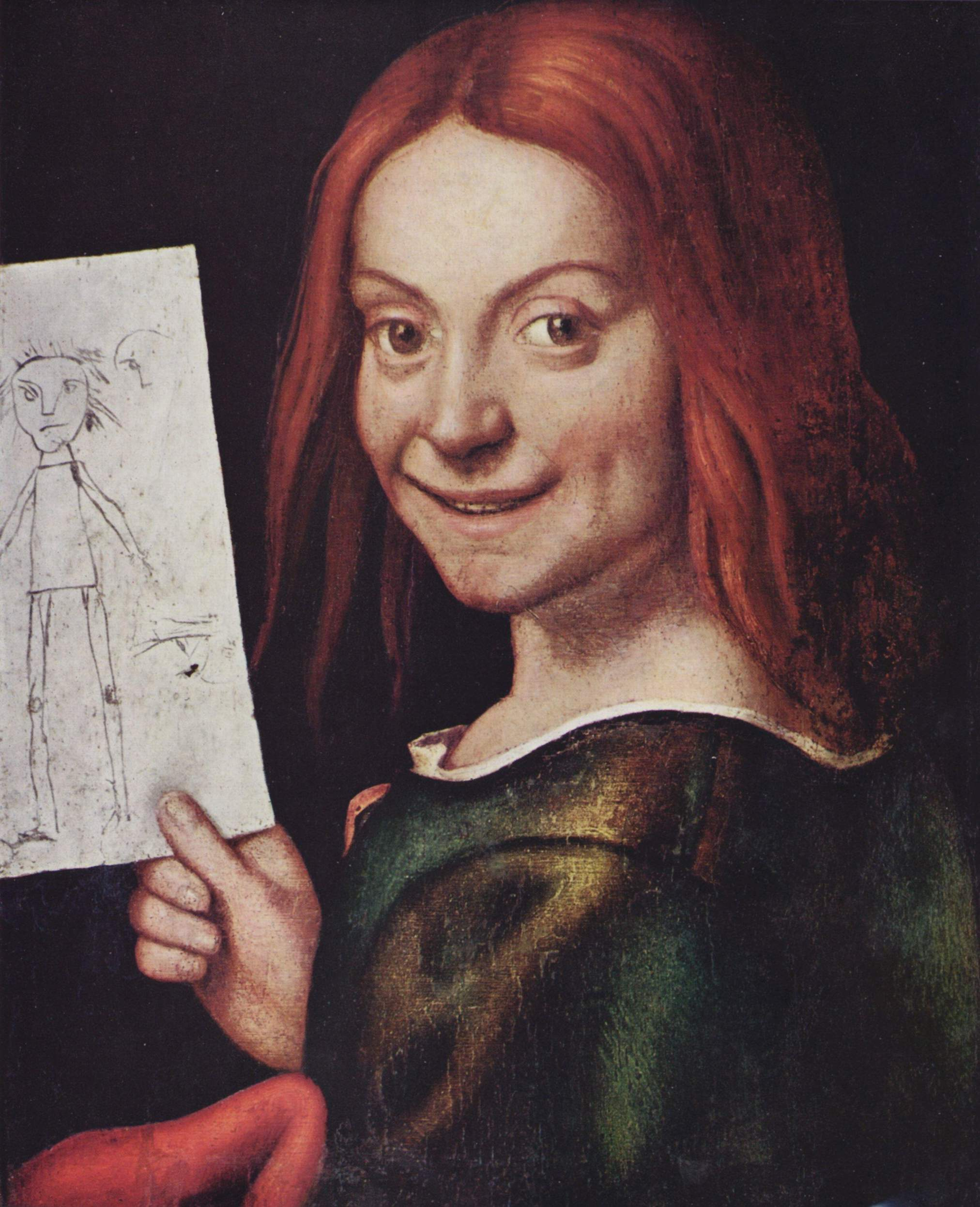
Giovan Francesco Caroto, Red-headed Youth Holding a Drawing, 1523, oil on panel, 62×48 cm, Verona, Castelvecchio Museum.

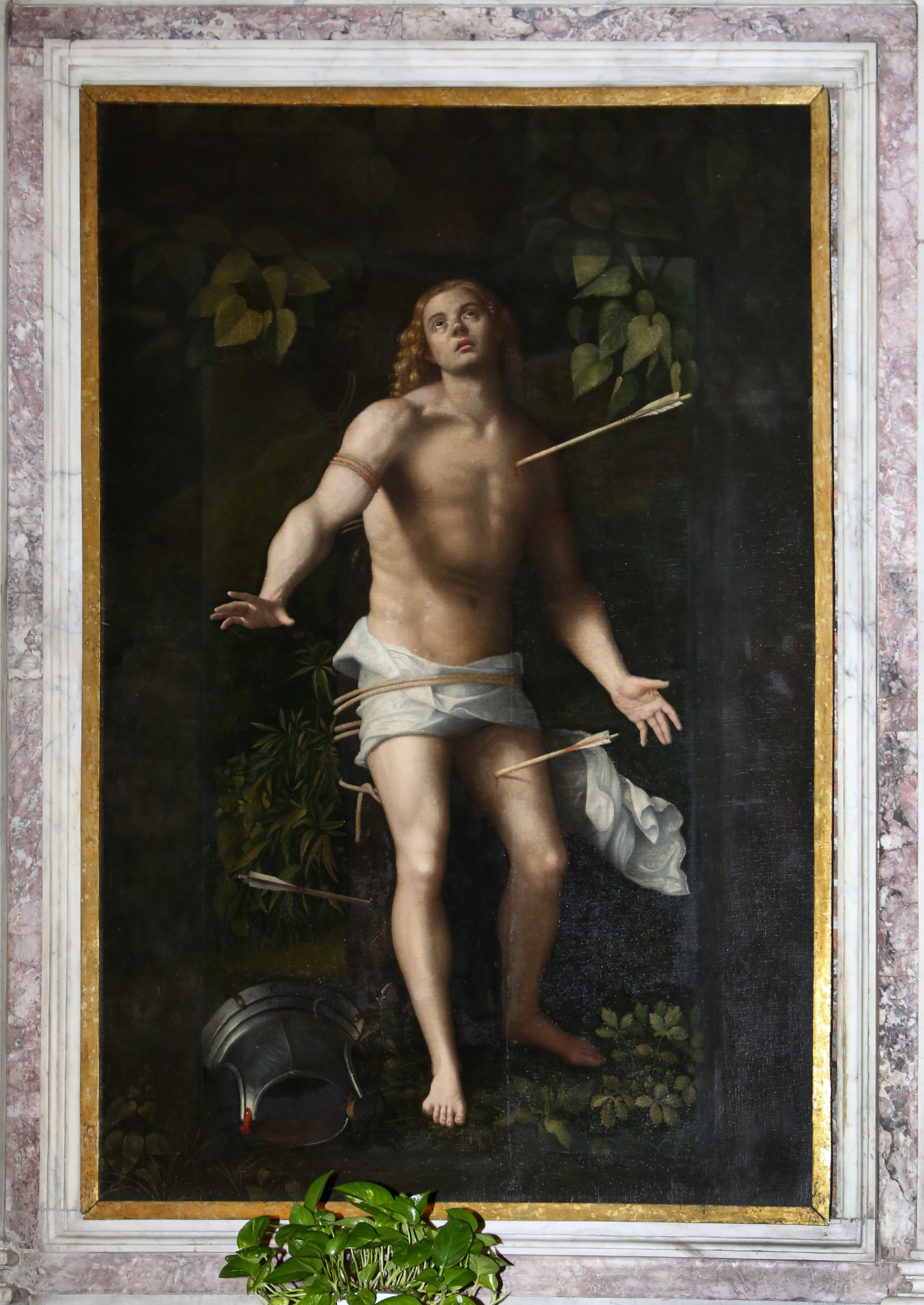
Giovan Francesco Caroto, Saint Sebastian, 1523, oil on canvas, Casale Monferrato, Santo Stefano Church.

His predisposition for experimentation, virtuosity, and formal abstraction reaches its peak in a fanciful reinterpretation of a work by Luini, Boy with a Puzzle, which the Veronese painter creates in the canvas Red-headed Youth Holding a Drawing, his most famous work, now housed at the Castelvecchio Museum. The originality of the subject—a child depicted turning to the viewer, laughing, and showing his childish drawing—represents almost a unicum in an era when portraying a child as an autonomous figure was rare. Moreover, the modernity of the idea of placing a drawing in the child’s hands makes the work even more singular. Its possible date of creation has been the subject of various interpretations; today, it is generally considered to have been created around the same time as Saint Catherine, due to certain facial features of the boy that resemble those of the saint. Regarding the subject's identity, the lack of gender or social status indicators rules out the possibility that he is a member of the nobility. This suggests that he is one of the artist's close acquaintances or even one of his children.

Several documents attest to the artist’s presence around 1523 in Montferrat, likely to dispose of some land holdings. It is probably during this temporary stay that he created the Saint Sebastian for the Santo Stefano Church. Giovan Francesco demonstrates particular originality in his style in this painting by signing on the saint’s discarded armor on the ground. He revisits the theme of the nude, which he previously addressed in the Deposition. The mastery with which he approaches the work firmly establishes him among Renaissance painters: a complete artist capable of mastering the technique of chiaroscuro. The painting draws clear inspiration from Lombard painters, though connections with the styles of Bramante and Correggio have also been noted. His return to Casale, and thus renewed contact with Lombard artists, inspired Caroto to create another canvas, showing significant influences from Giampietrino’s works, depicting Sophonisba Drinking the Poison (now at Castelvecchio), though the protagonist has sometimes been identified as Cleopatra or Artemisia rather than the Carthaginian queen, recognized by most.

Returning to Verona again, in 1524, he created a fresco, God the Father and the Seven Virtues, for the Portalupi palace, a sub-commission from Giulio della Torre. From these years onward, his style changed again, increasingly aligning with those then in vogue in Rome, spread in Lombardy through the circulation of prints of Raphael’s works and the departure of many artists from the eternal city following the historic Sack of Rome. This new approach to painting by Giovan Francesco, already glimpsed in the aforementioned fresco, reaches its fullest expression in the predella of San Bernardino, now housed in Bergamo. His continuous travels also helped bring numerous stylistic influences to Verona, impacting local painters such as Francesco Morone and Torbido.

In 1527, he created the panels Nativity of Mary and Massacre of the Innocents, which, according to Vasari, formed a predella for the San Bernardino Church in Verona and are now housed at the Accademia Carrara. According to historian Dal Bravo, these two works are attributable to the “compositions of Benvenuto Tisi da Garofalo; the preferred Lombard style is overlaid with a taste oriented toward Raphaelesque compositions known through prints or the mediation of Emilian artists such as Ludovico Mazzolino.”

=== New Influences from Mantua ===
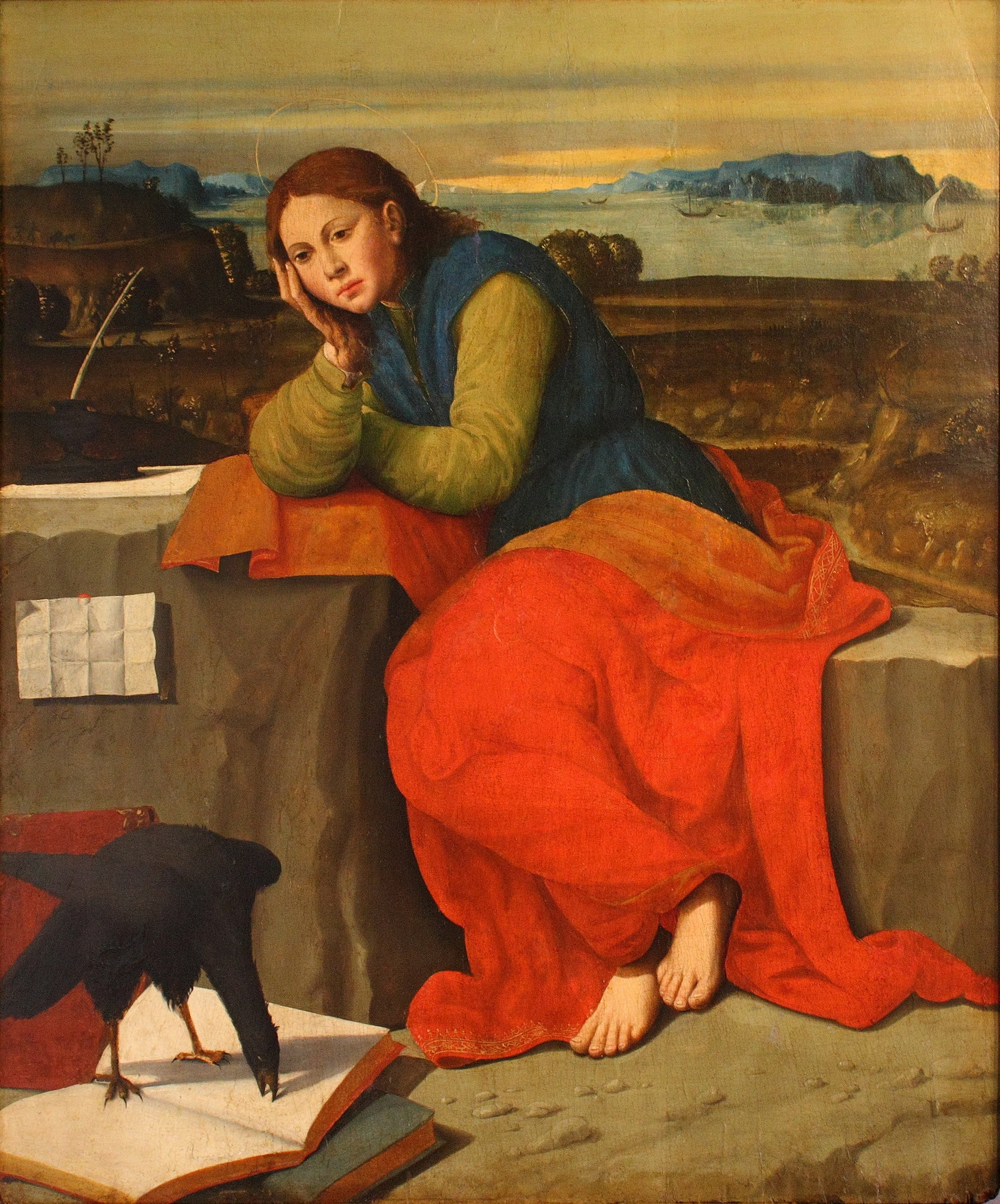
Giovan Francesco Caroto, Saint John the Evangelist on Patmos, c. 1528, oil on panel, 77.8×92 cm, Prague, Národní Galerie.

Regarding Giovan Francesco’s artistic production in the third decade of the 16th century, critics have often been particularly harsh, raising doubts about an alleged excess of versatility due to the various styles blending in his works. However, some authors believe these criticisms partly stem from incorrect attributions of many works. In any case, during this period, his paintings incorporate further stylistic influences from the works of Giulio Romano and Parmigianino. It is believed that the Veronese artist reconnected with Mantuan painting through his association with Margaret Paleologa, daughter of William of Montferrat and a friend of the painter from his time in Casale, who had since married the Duke of Mantua, Federico II Gonzaga.

The year 1528 was when Giovan Francesco Caroto enjoyed the greatest artistic inspiration of his life. During this period, he created one of his most famous works, the altarpiece Mary and the Saints for the San Fermo Maggiore church, a work that earned the praise of Giorgio Vasari and the appreciation of all Veronese historiographers, who deemed it his masterpiece for its richness in stylistic content, not lacking the “usual sense of archaism” typical of the Veronese painter. Art historian Adolfo Venturi notes that the painter “draws in this work on a highly elevated Raphaelesque style,” reminiscent of the solutions adopted by the Urbino master for his Madonna of Foligno, though not achieving the same results in spatial management. In the same year, he created the Annunciation, long preserved at Villa Costanza in San Pietro in Cariano (and now part of a private collection, possibly in the United States), originally painted for the Veronese church of San Bartolomeo Apostolo. Also from 1528 is the aforementioned Saint John the Evangelist of Patmos (housed in Prague, Národní Galerie), initially intended as part of a larger composition, considered a high-level work by many critics. Between 1530 and 1531, he signed two Holy Family paintings, the first preserved in Milan and the second at the Castelvecchio Museum in Verona, both adhering to the Mannerist style with unmistakable references to the style of Giulio Romano.

Vasari recounts that, in the early 1530s, he was offered the opportunity to decorate the choir of the Verona Cathedral, a highly prestigious commission that the Veronese painter declined. According to the Arezzo painter and historian, this refusal was due to Giovan Francesco’s desire to maintain his independence, as the frescoes were to be executed based on Giulio Romano’s designs. It is unclear whether this account is true, but the work was later assigned to Torbido, who began working on it in 1534.

=== Final period ===
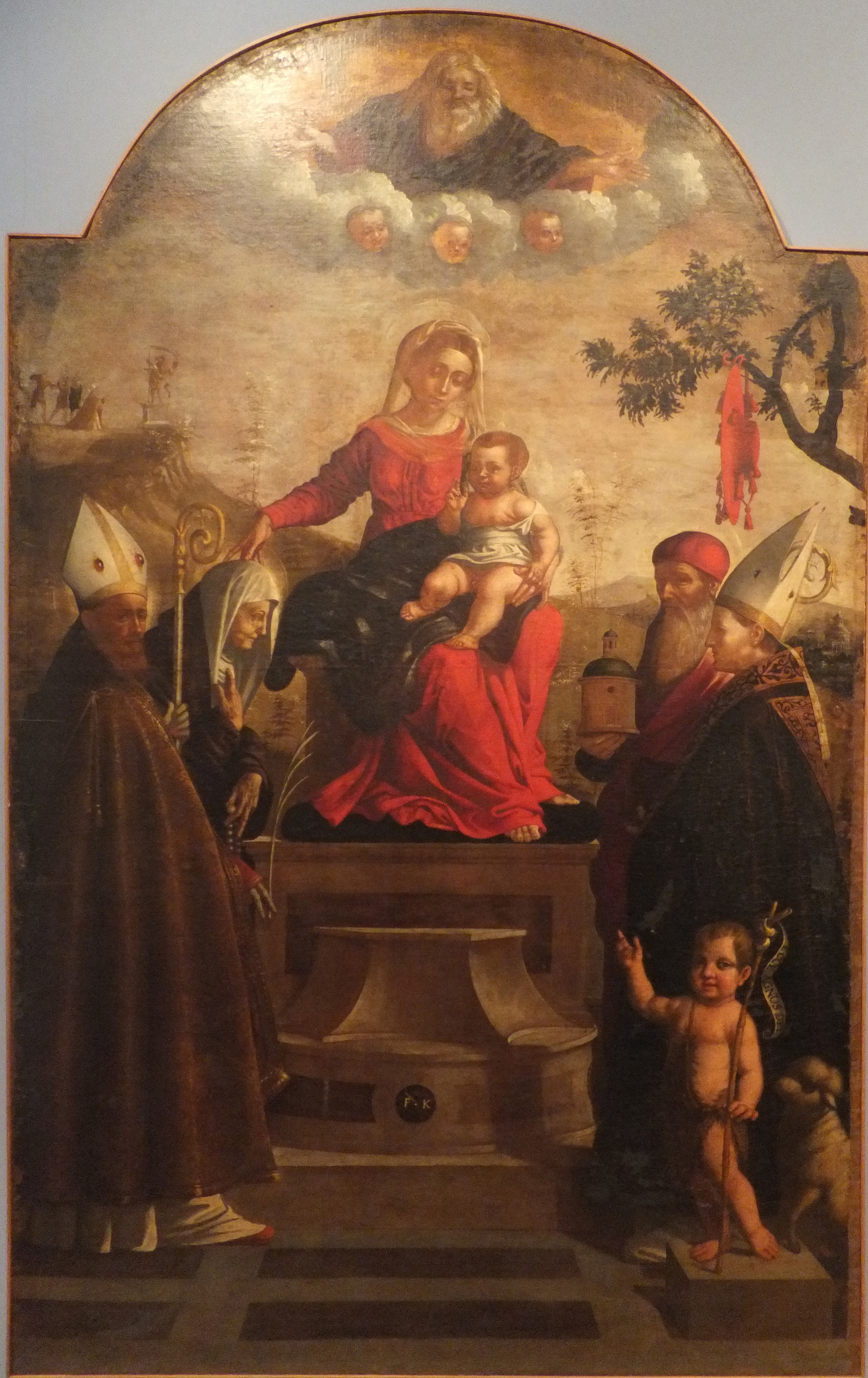
Giovan Francesco Caroto, Madonna Enthroned with Saints, c. 1540, oil on arched canvas, 246×136 cm, Trento, Cathedral.

Modern critics attribute the six landscapes painted on the backs of the pews in the gallery of the Church of Santa Maria in Organo to Giovan Francesco Caroto. The paintings date back to the 1530s. (Note: Initially, Antonio Avena dated these landscapes to the first decade of the 1500s, thus to the early years of Caroto’s career. Through comparison with stylistic solutions adopted by the painter over his career and the study of inventory documents found in the archives of the Santa Maria in Organo church, Maria Teresa Franco Fiorio attributes the work to Caroto’s later production, around the early 1530s. In Fiorio (1971, p. 61).) These were initially attributed to Domenico Brusasorzi, but were later correctly ascribed to Caroto following an analysis by Antonio Avena, subsequently confirmed by the discovery of the Veronese painter’s signature during a restoration.

Also from these years, the Resurrection of Lazarus, now housed at the Palazzo del Vescovado in Verona, signed with a monogram and dated 1531, is a work in which Giovan Francesco offers a view of his hometown in the background, where the Castelvecchio Bridge is clearly recognizable, illuminated by the sunset. The use of this backdrop depicting local landscapes reconnects Giovan Francesco to the Veronese school of painting and the style of his brother Giovanni Caroto, the latter more adherent to the Veronese tradition.

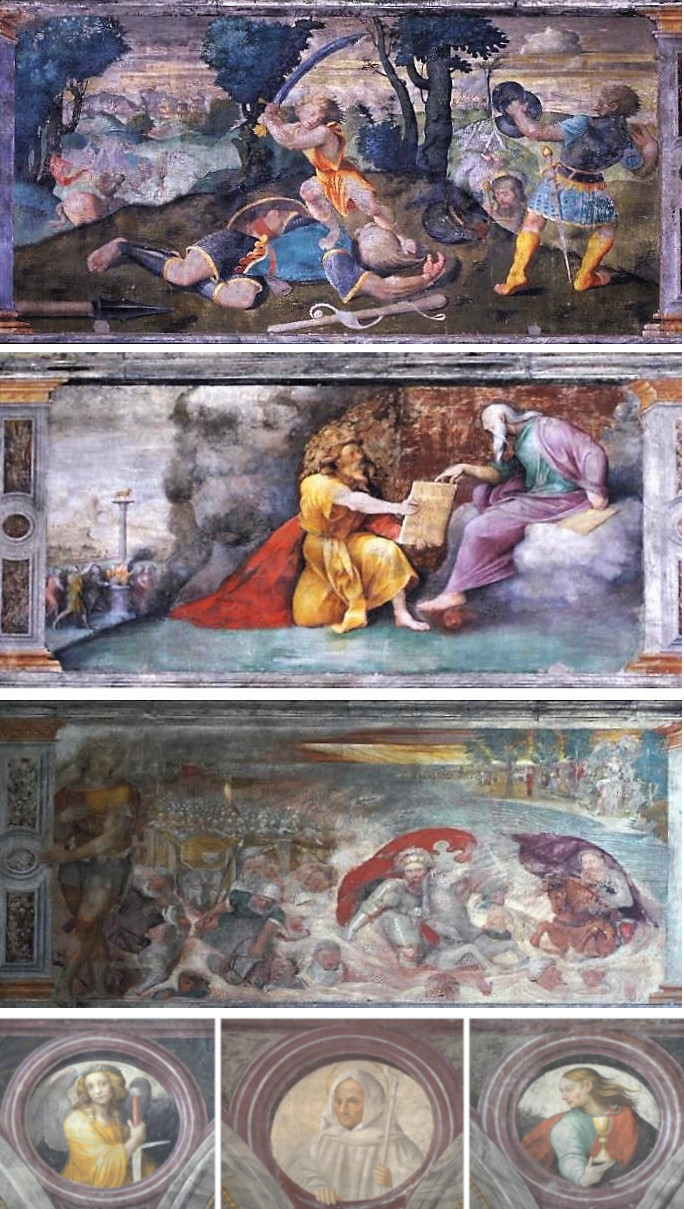
Some frescoes from the cycle Stories of the Old Testament, c. 1540, painted by Caroto for the northern wall of the central nave of the Santa Maria in Organo church in Verona. From top to bottom: David and Goliath, Moses Receiving the Tablets, Crossing of the Red Sea. Below, the tondi: Saint Michael the Archangel, Olivetan Monk, Saint John the Evangelist.

The third decade of the 16th century was, for Giovan Francesco, a period of great commitment that resulted in high-quality works combining “the influences of Roman culture with new personal accents.” One of the most exemplary works of this period, despite some past doubts about its attribution, is a cycle of frescoes painted on the northern wall of the central nave of the Santa Maria in Organo church, opposite those painted by Nicola Giolfino. This cycle includes four biblical scenes, Stories of the Old Testament, separated by faux pillars with an architrave, specifically depicting the Crossing of the Red Sea, The Delivery of the Tablets to Moses, David and Goliath, and Elijah Taken to Heaven. These scenes are complemented by four tondi depicting two Olivetans, Saint Michael the Archangel, and Saint John the Evangelist. These frescoes represent a vibrant demonstration of the Veronese painter’s quality, drawing heavily on the style and models of Giulio Romano.

Regarding the depiction of the two Olivetans in the frescoes of Santa Maria in Organo, both Giovan Francesco and his brother Giovanni executed at least three other portraits of Benedictine monks during their lives. This suggests that the two brothers had strong, though undocumented, connections with the regular clergy residing at the time in the Santi Nazaro e Celso monastery in Verona. Among these works, a canvas by Giovan Francesco, Young Benedictine Monk, is preserved at the Castelvecchio Museum, which, due to similarities with his Sophonisba, is generally attributed to a relatively early production, though with some reservations from critics.

Some art historians tend to attribute to Giovan Francesco a cycle of frescoes, Stories of the Apocalypse, decorating Villa Del Bene in Volargne (municipality of Dolcè), created in collaboration with his brother and the young Domenico Brusasorzi. However, the less-than-exceptional quality of the work raises doubts about this attribution. It is likely that Giovan Francesco’s contribution was marginal and that the dating refers to the final years of his life, when his production had become qualitatively weaker.

His last works of note, the altarpieces Marriage of Saint Catherine (1540 for the Santa Caterina Martire church in Bionde of Salizzole), Saint Ursula and the Eleven Thousand Virgins (1545 for the San Giorgio in Braida church), and Saint Martin and the Poor (for the Sant'Anastasia church), appear cold and superficial, marking the end of Caroto’s pictorial production. In this regard, Vasari noted: “having grown old, he began to lose his skill in the arts.”

On April 29, 1555, he drafted his will, stating that he was “afflicted by adverse bodily health,” suggesting he died shortly afterward, certainly within the same year. (Note: Giovan Francesco Caroto is not mentioned in either the 1556 census or the 1558 tax record. In Fiorio (1971, p. 23).) According to Vasari, the Veronese painter was buried in the “San Nicolò chapel of the Madonna dell’Organo, which he had adorned with his paintings,” where his brother Giovanni also rests. Of these paintings, only the aforementioned four Old Testament scenes frescoed on the left side of the central nave remain today.

== Style ==
Giovan Francesco Caroto’s style has been described by many as “eclectic,” characterized by the numerous influences that evolved in tandem with the various journeys he undertook throughout his life. In his early works, he primarily demonstrated adherence to the style of Liberale da Verona and, above all, to that of the renowned Mantuan painter Andrea Mantegna. His mature artistic production is generally considered to span from the beginning of his stay in Casale Monferrato (around 1511) to around 1530, when he reached his peak of inspiration. During his time in Lombardy, he benefited from a highly cosmopolitan environment, receiving influences from the style of Bramantino, the Leonardeschi, Luini, Solari, and many others, not to mention the impact of Flemish art. The intense and fruitful production of the 1528–30 biennium coincided with the height of Giovan Francesco’s career, while the subsequent phase, lasting until his death, appears less rich both quantitatively and qualitatively, lacking the constant reworking of new ideas that characterized his earlier works.

== Works ==
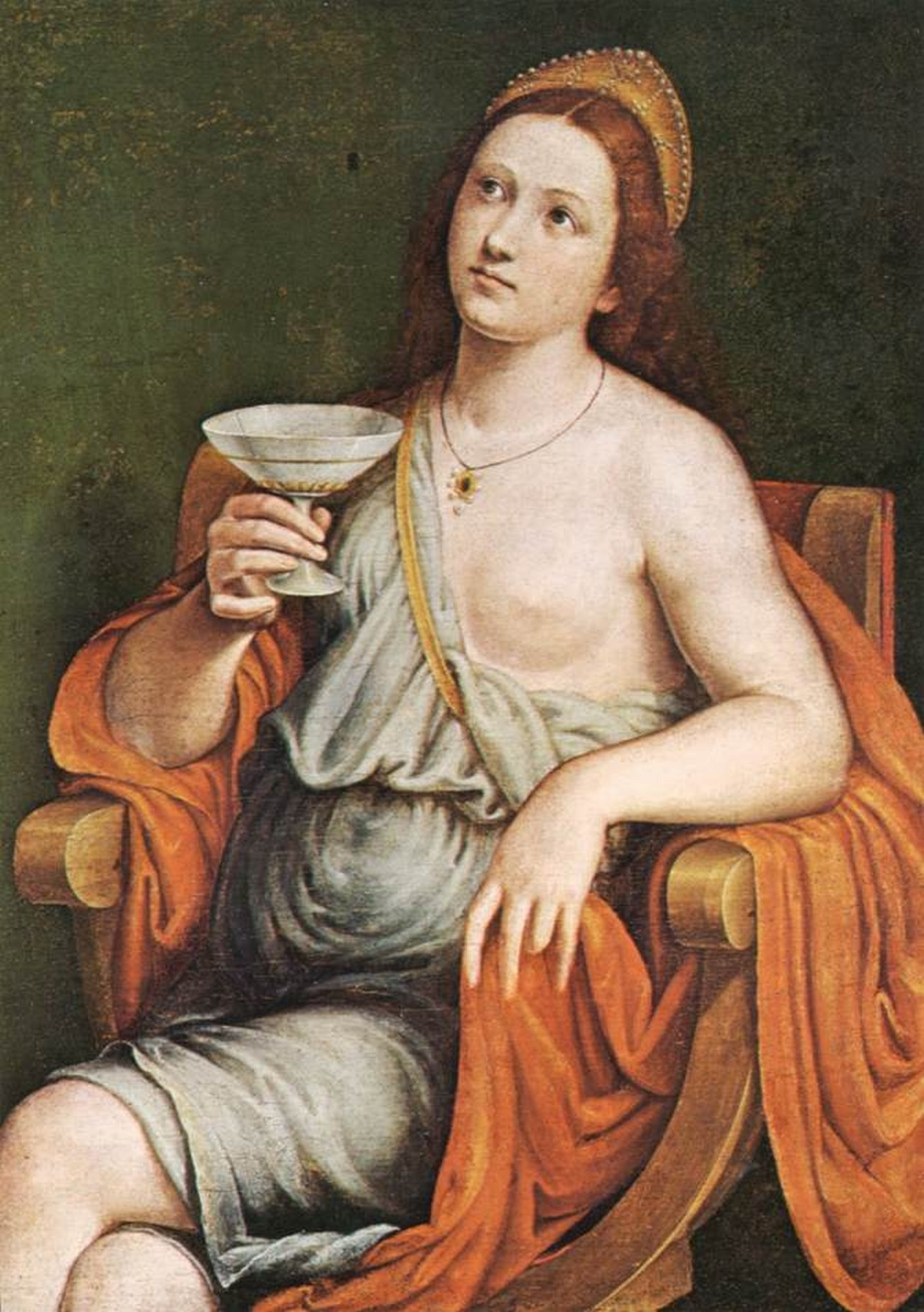
Giovan Francesco Caroto, Sophonisba Drinking the Poison, oil on canvas, 94×66 cm, Verona, Castelvecchio Museum.

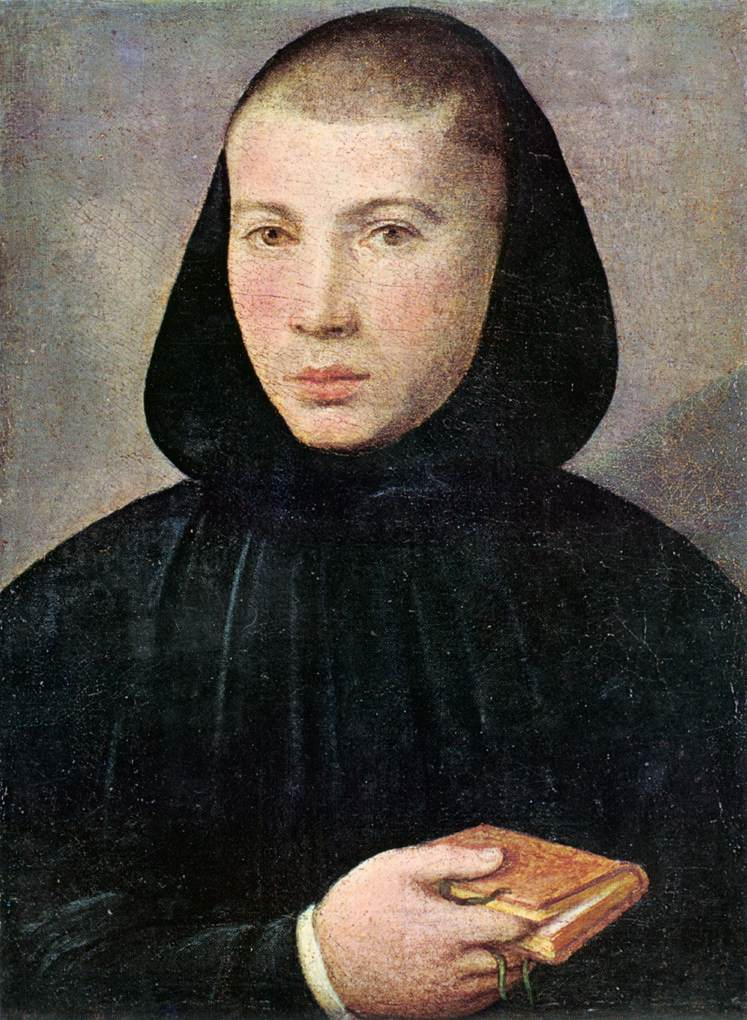
Giovan Francesco Caroto, Portrait of a Young Benedictine, oil on canvas, 43×33 cm, Castelvecchio Museum, Verona.

The following is a list of Giovan Francesco Caroto’s main works:

- Annunciation, 1508, fresco on the triumphal arch, Verona, San Gerolamo oratory.
- Annunciation, 1528, oil on canvas, 170×160 cm, private collection (formerly Villa Costanza in San Pietro in Cariano).
- God the Father and the Seven Virtues, 1524, fresco, Verona, Persico Portalupi palace.
- Red-headed Youth Holding a Drawing, 1523, oil on panel, 62×48 cm, Verona, Castelvecchio Museum.
- Portrait of a Young Benedictine, oil on canvas, 43×33 cm, Verona, Castelvecchio Museum.
- Washing of the Feet, late 1530s, Verona, Castelvecchio Museum.
- Lucrezia, c. 1513, oil on canvas, Berlin, Staatliche Museen (destroyed during World War II).
- Madonna with Child, oil on canvas, 53.8×67.8 cm, Pavia, civic museums.
- Madonna with Child, 1523–1524, oil on panel, 56×43 cm, Frankfurt, Städel Museum.
- Madonna with Child in a Landscape, c. 1540, oil on canvas, 54×68 cm, Pavia, Pinacoteca Malaspina.
- Madonna with Child in Glory and Saints, 1528, oil on canvas, 325×220 cm, Verona, San Fermo Maggiore church.
- Madonna Sewing, 1501, oil on panel, 48×39 cm, Modena, Galleria Estense.
- Lucifer Expelled, oil on canvas, 98×113 cm, Verona, Castelvecchio Museum.
- Madonna Enthroned with Saints, c. 1540, oil on arched canvas, 246×136 cm, Trento, Cathedral.
- Nativity of Mary, c. 1532, oil on canvas, 72.5×61 cm, Sibiu, Brukenthal National Museum.
- Deposition, 1515, oil on panel, 90×146 cm, Turin, Fontana collection.
- Deposition of the Tears, oil on canvas, 129×98 cm, Verona, Castelvecchio Museum.
- San Giorgio in Braida Polyptych: Saint Sebastian, oil on panel, 148×56 cm; Saint Roch, oil on panel, 148×56 cm; lunette with the Transfiguration, oil on panel, 75×220 cm. Predella: Agony in the Garden, oil on panel, 26×54 cm; Deposition, oil on panel, 26×57 cm; Resurrection, oil on panel, 26×54 cm. San Giorgio in Braida, Verona.
- Resurrection of Lazarus, 1531, oil on canvas, 140×110 cm, Verona, Palazzo del Vescovado.
- Holy Family, 1531, oil on canvas, 125×90 cm, Verona, Castelvecchio Museum.
- Saint John the Evangelist on Patmos, 1528, oil on panel, 77.8×92 cm, Prague, Národní Galerie.
- Saint Martin and the Poor, 1542, oil on arched canvas, 278×186 cm, Verona, Basilica of Sant'Anastasia.
- Saint Michael, c. 1531, oil on canvas, 86×127.5 cm, Budapest, Museum of Fine Arts.
- Saint Sebastian, 1523, Casale Monferrato, Santo Stefano church.
- Saint Catherine of Alexandria, oil on canvas, 180×85 cm, Verona, Castelvecchio Museum.
- Saint Ursula and the Eleven Thousand Virgins, 1545, oil on canvas, Verona, San Giorgio in Braida church.
- Sophonisba Drinking the Poison, oil on canvas, 94×66 cm, Verona, Castelvecchio Museum.
- Biblical Stories, c. 1540, fresco, Verona, Santa Maria in Organo church.
- Stories of the Childhood of Christ, c. 1507, oil on panels, 165×109 cm each, Florence, Uffizi Gallery.
- Stories of Tobias and Stories of the Archangel Raphael, 1508, cycle of frescoes, Verona, Sant'Eufemia church.
- Massacre of the Innocents, 1527, oil on panel, 32×63 cm, Bergamo, Accademia Carrara.
- Nativity of Mary, 1527, oil on panel, 31.8×63.3 cm, Bergamo, Accademia Carrara.
- Adoration of the Magi, 1527, oil on panel, 32.3×63.2 cm, Bergamo, Accademia Carrara.

=== Attributed works ===
- Ecce Homo with Saints Bernardino, Francis, Anthony, and Clare, c. 1520, oil on canvas, 207×205 cm, Verona, Castelvecchio Museum.
- Dido Abandoned, 1505–1510, oil on panel, 128×119 cm, Amsterdam.
- Blood of the Redeemer and Saints Maurice and Sebastian, 1506–1508, Redondesco, San Maurizio Martire parish church.
- Saints Michael, Cosmas, and Damian, c. 1506, oil on canvas, 210×147 cm, Mantua, Carità church.
- Sibyl, c. 1540, oil on canvas, 73×63 cm, Mantua, Ducal Palace.

== See also ==
- Leonardeschi
- Renaissance in Lombardy

== Bibliography ==
- Del Bravo, Carlo (1964). "Per G. F. Caroto" [For G. F. Caroto]. Paragone (173).
- Brugnoli, Pierpaolo (1954). La chiesa di San Giorgio [The San Giorgio Church]. Le Guide, 5. Verona.
- Fiorio, Maria Teresa Franco (1971). Giovan Francesco Caroto [Giovan Francesco Caroto]. Verona: Vita Veronese.
- Marchiori, Paola (1974). Pierpaolo Brugnoli (ed.). Maestri della pittura veronese [Masters of Veronese Painting]. Banca Mutua Popolare di Verona.
- Marini, Paola; Peretti, Gianni; Rossi, Francesca, eds. (2010). Museo di Castelvecchio. Catalogo generale dei dipinti e delle miniature delle collezioni civiche veronesi [Castelvecchio Museum. General Catalogue of Paintings and Miniatures of the Veronese Civic Collections]. Vol. 1: From the End of the 10th to the Beginning of the 16th Century. Cinisello Balsamo: Silvana. ISBN 978-88-8215-425-7.
- Francesca Rossi; Gianni Peretti; Edoardo Rossetti, eds. (2020). Caroto. Giovan Francesco Caroto (1480 circa-1555) [Caroto. Giovan Francesco Caroto (c. 1480–1555)]. Cinisello Balsamo: SilvanaEditoriale. ISBN 978-88-366-4782-8.
- Simeoni, Luigi (1904). "Nuovi documenti sul Caroto" [New Documents on Caroto]. L'Arte (VII).
- Vasari, Giorgio (1568). Le vite de' più eccellenti pittori, scultori e architettori [The Lives of the Most Excellent Painters, Sculptors, and Architects].
- Viviani, Giuseppe Franco, ed. (2002). Chiese di Verona [Churches of Verona]. Società Cattolica di Assicurazioni.
- Zannandreis, Diego (1891). Giuseppe Biadego (ed.). Le vite dei pittori, scultori e architetti veronesi [The Lives of Veronese Painters, Sculptors, and Architects]. Verona: Stabilimento Tipo-Litografico G. Franchini.
- Zanolli Gemi, Nelly (1992). Santa Eufemia [Sant'Eufemia]. Verona: Banca Popolare di Verona.
