= Niccolò Giolfino =

Italian painter

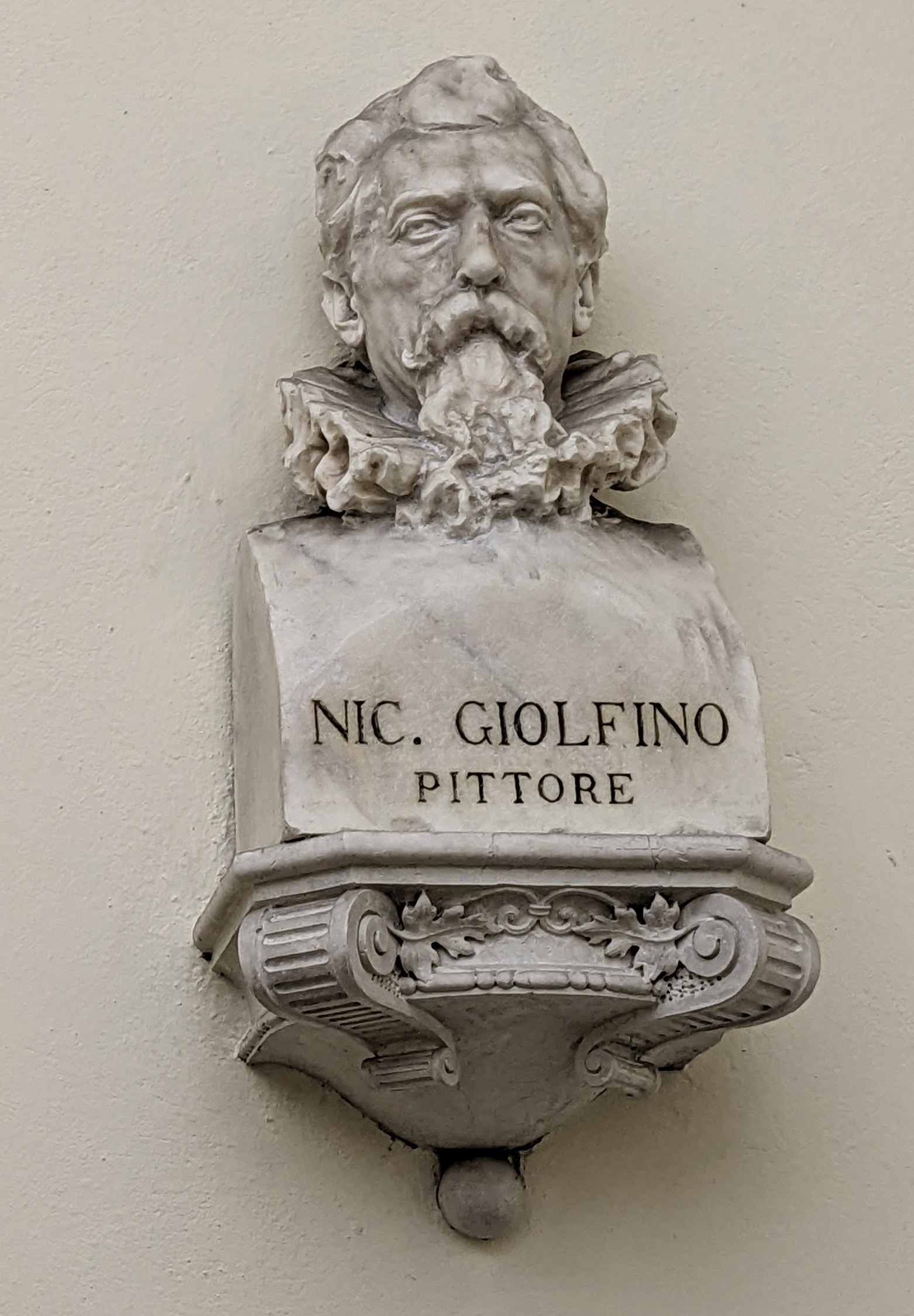
- Bust of Niccolò Giolfino
- Born: c. 1476; Verona, Republic of Venice
- Died: 1555; Verona, Republic of Venice
- Education: Liberale da Verona
- Occupation: Painter
- Movement: Renaissance

Niccolò Giolfino (c. 1476 – 1555) was an Italian painter of the Renaissance period, active mainly in Verona. He painted mainly sacred subjects for local churches.

== Biography ==
=== Early life and education ===
Born into a family of sculptors active in Verona during the 15th and 16th centuries, he was the son of Nicolò Giolfino. He was trained in the workshop of Liberale da Verona along with Giovanni Francesco Caroto, and his earlier works, such as the altarpiece depicting the Pentecost (1518; Sant'Anastasia, Verona), show a linear quality and hard surface compared to that of his master.

=== Career ===
Giolfino's importance as a fresco painter is established in his decoration, between 1512 and 1522, of the chapel of San Francesco, San Bernardino, Verona, where, in an attempt to reproduce consistent illusionism, he skilfully used scenographic techniques to organize complex episodes of the Life of Saint Francis. In the scene of Saint Francis Renouncing his Inheritance, the architecture is used to create a foreground stage, and a view of the River Adige to the upper left conveys a sense of spaciousness. In Giolfino's frescoes depicting scenes from the Old Testament in Santa Maria in Organo, Verona, dating from the 1530s, the forms are smoother and more intensely coloured than in earlier works.

The Cappella degli Avanzi, San Bernardino, contains several important works in oil by Giolfino. On the upper left wall are a Resurrection, Christ before Pilate and Christ Nailed to the Cross. All have rather slender, static forms and appear to be earlier than his Arrest of Christ (1546) on the lower right, with its more powerful, muscular forms and heightened activity. Giolfino began with an eccentric yet conservative style, still related to Late-Gothic art, with slender forms and agitated draperies.

Giolfino's mature work is characterized by more robust, active forms and an intensity of colour that seems to favour malachite greens and vermilion. Giolfino died in Verona in 1555. His brother, Paolo Giolfino, painted in a similar style. One of his pupils was Paolo Farinato.

== Gallery ==
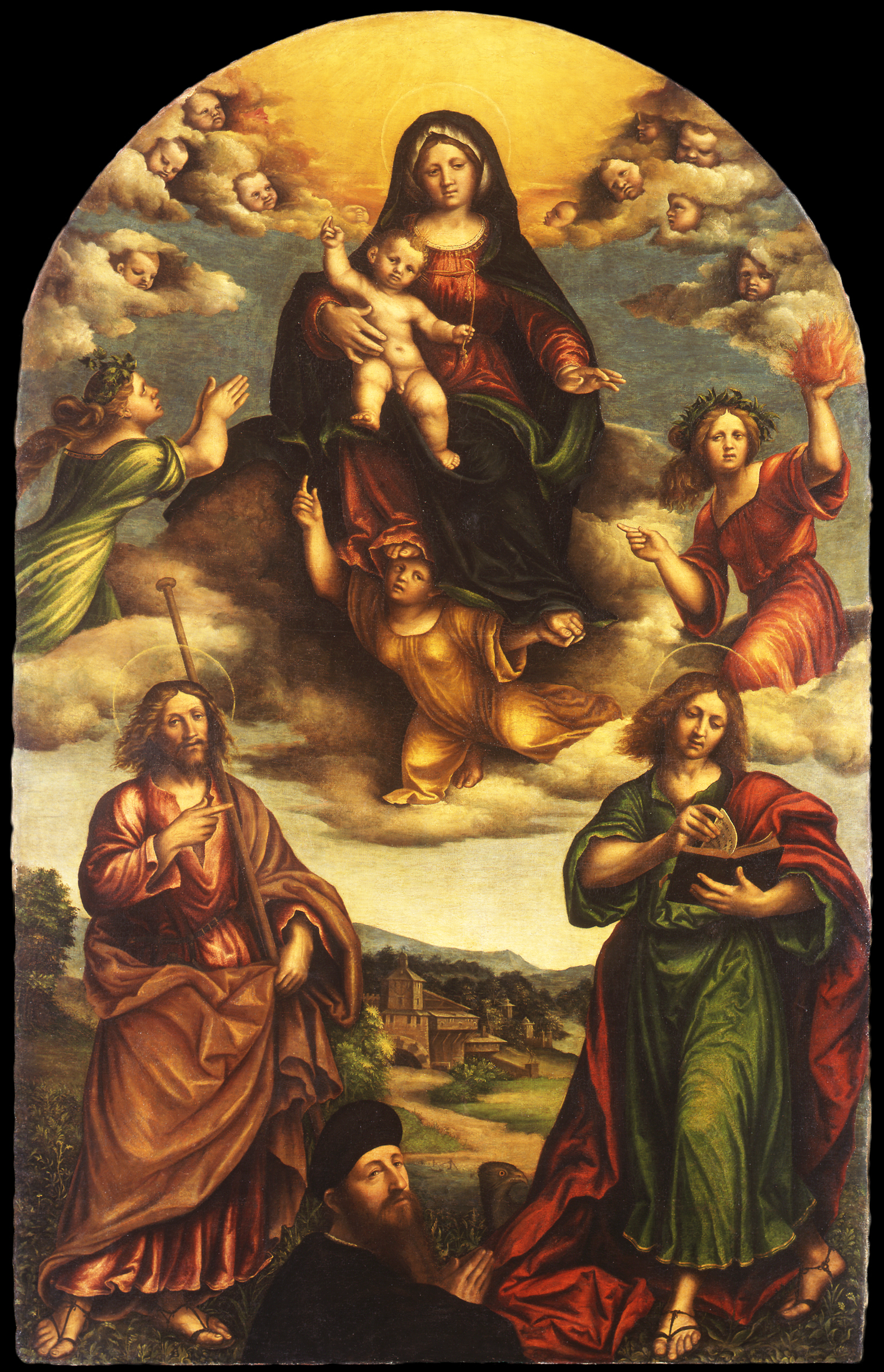
Madonna and Child with the Theological Virtues and Saints James and John, Bode Museum, Berlin

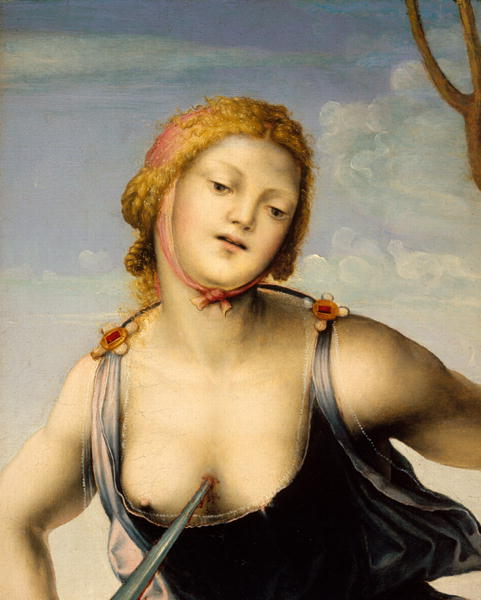
Lucrece, Allen Memorial Art Museum, Oberlin College, Ohio

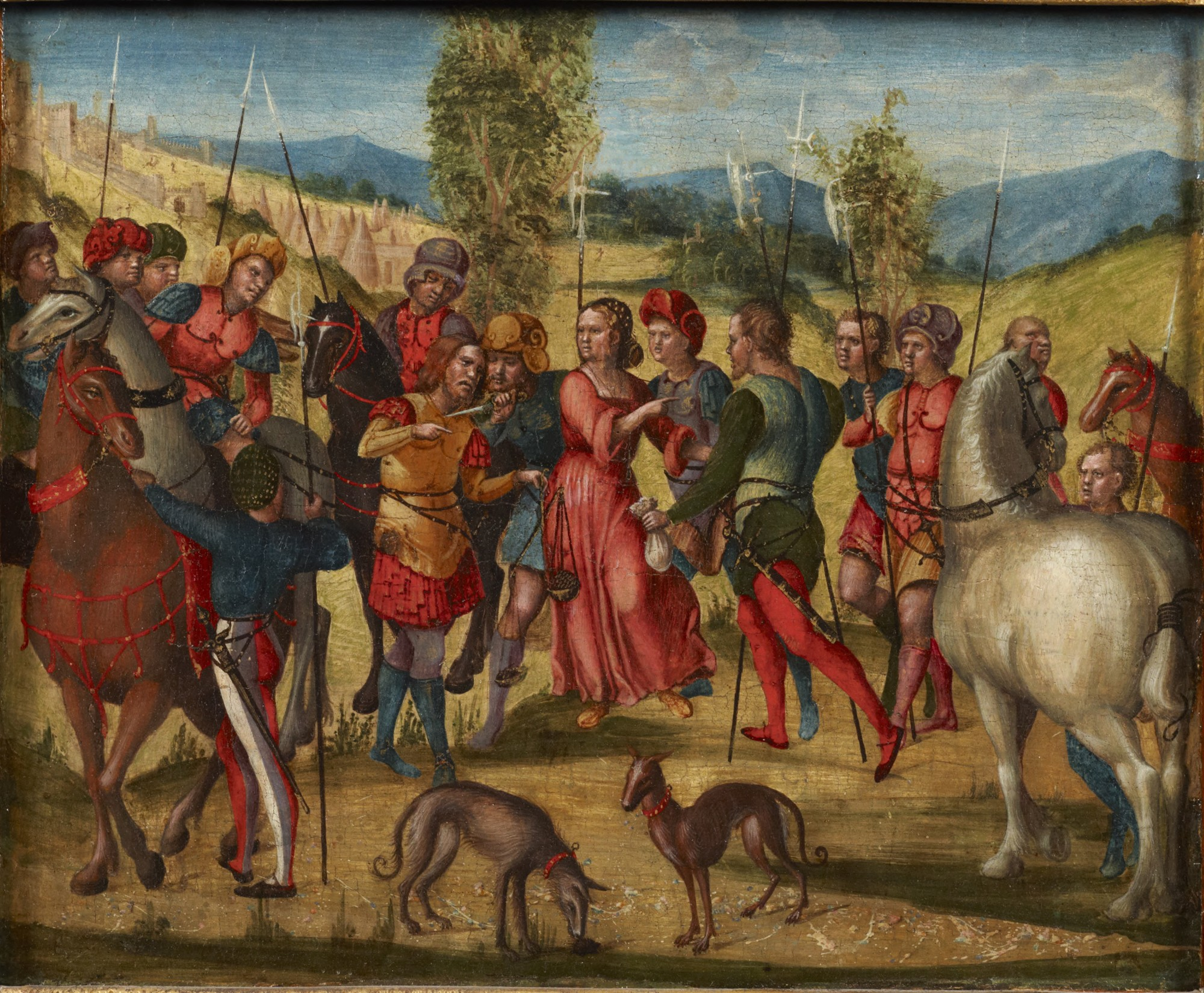
Chiomara and the Centurion, Princeton University Art Museum

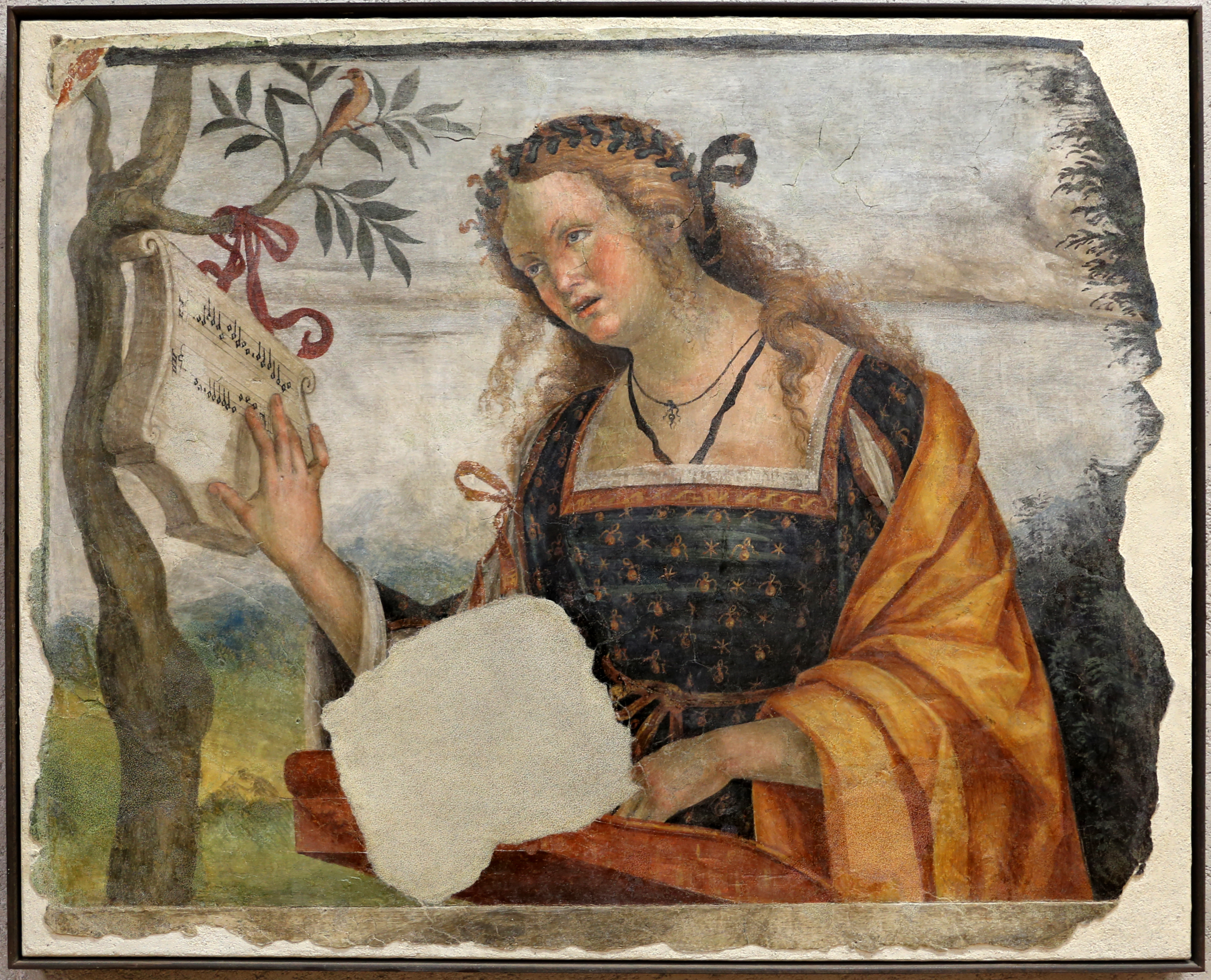
Allegory of Music, Castelvecchio Museum, Verona

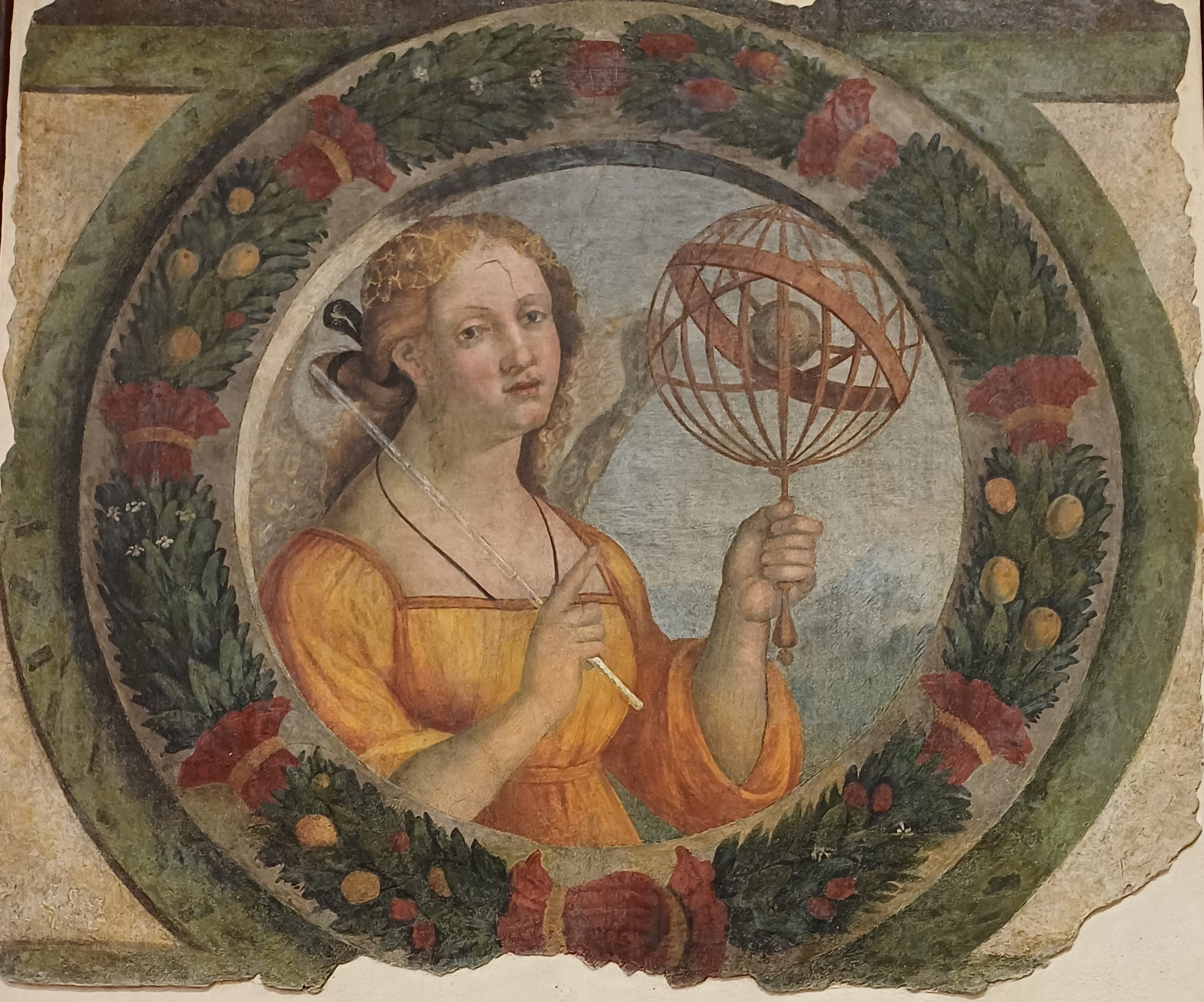
Allegory of Astronomy, Castelvecchio Museum, Verona

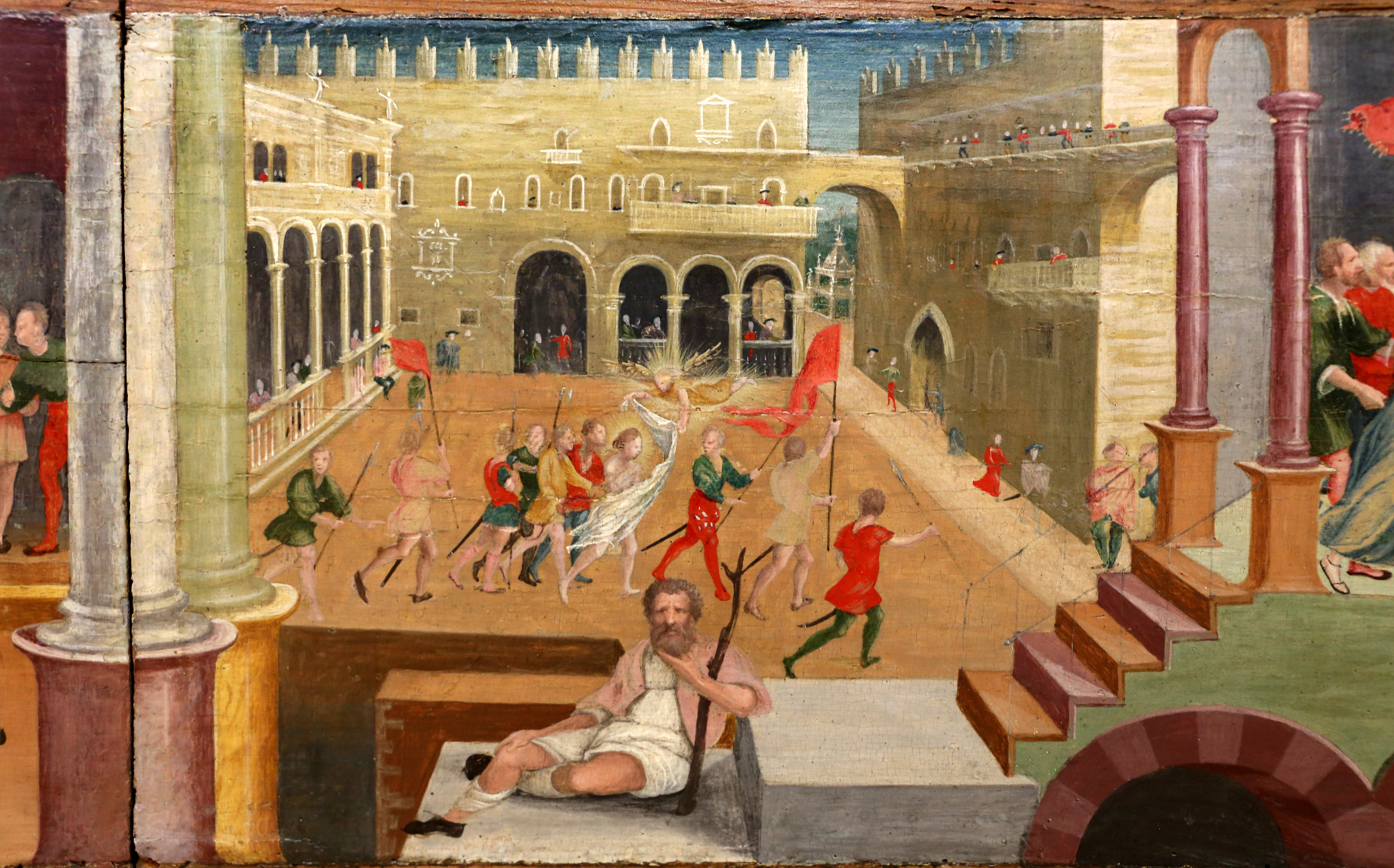
Stories of Saint Barbara, Castelvecchio Museum, Verona

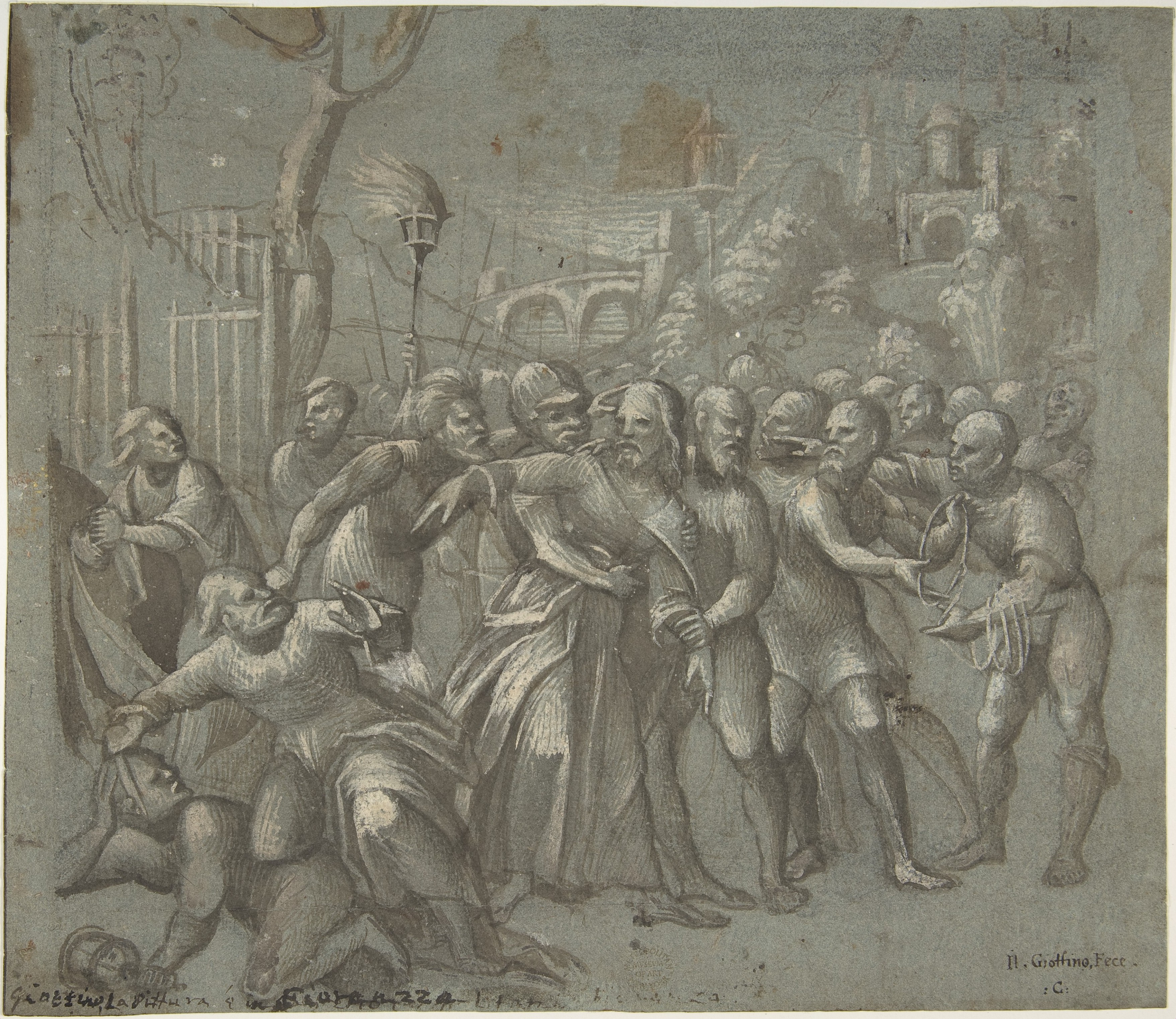
The Arrest of Christ, Metropolitan Museum of Art, New York

== Bibliography ==
- Berenson, B. (1907). North Italian Painters of the Renaissance. New York: G. P. Putnam's Sons. p. 235.
