= Santo Stefano, Casale Monferrato =

Roman Catholic church in Casale Monferrato, Italy

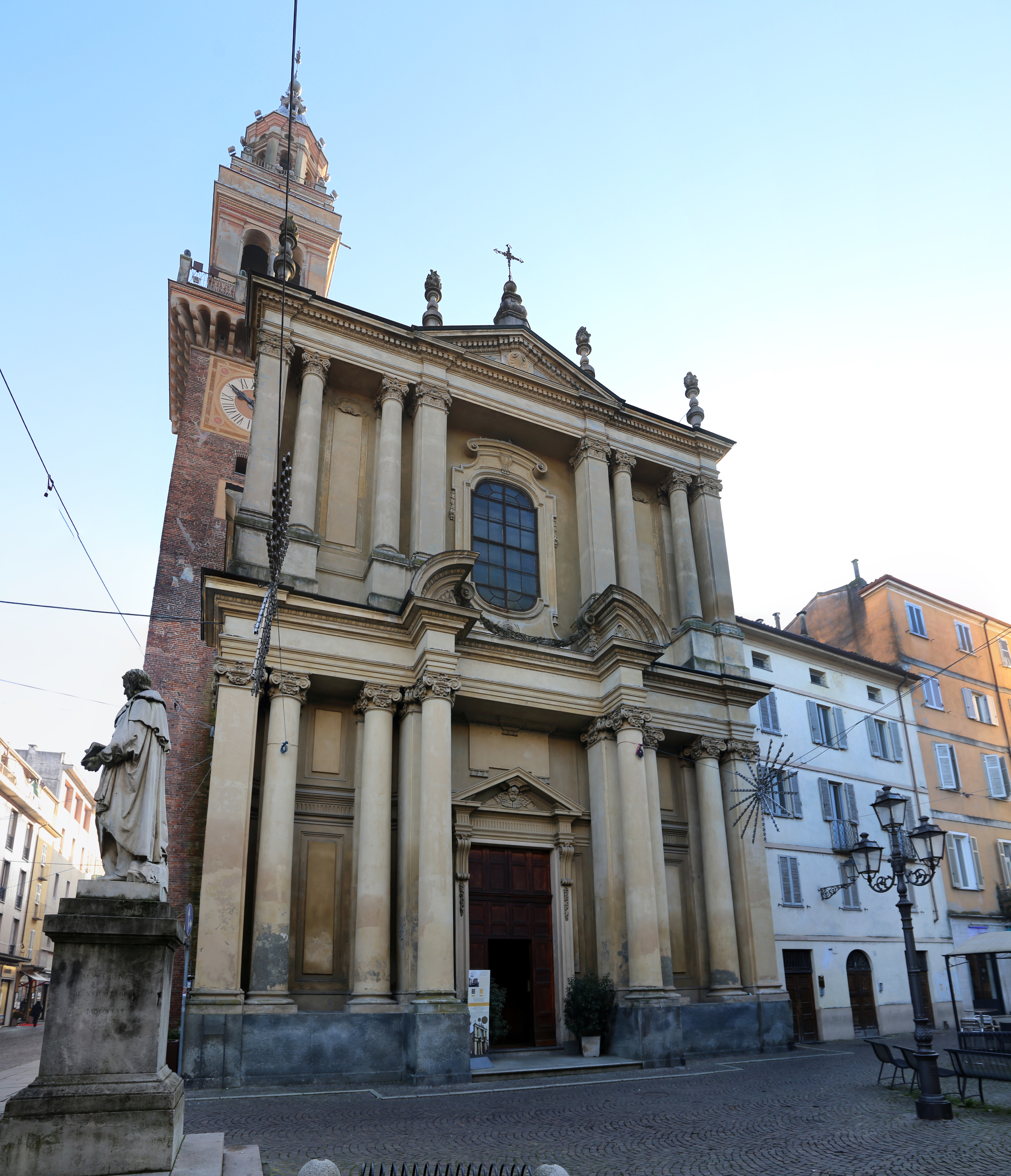
Casale monferrato, santo stefano, esterno 01.jpg

Santo Stefano is a Baroque-style, Roman Catholic church located on Piazza Santo Stefano, in Casale Monferrato, Province of Alessandria, region of Piedmont, Italy.

== History ==
A church at the site was present by the 12th century, but reconstructed in its present form in the 17th century, and consecrated in 1661. The church houses canvases depicting prophets and saints by Pier Francesco Guala. On one of the left altars is a depiction of Santa Lucia with Saints Crispin and Crispiniano by Guglielmo Caccia. An additional work of note is the St. Sebastian by Giovanni Francesco Caroto.
