= Saint John the Evangelist on Patmos =

Painting by Giovan Francesco Caroto

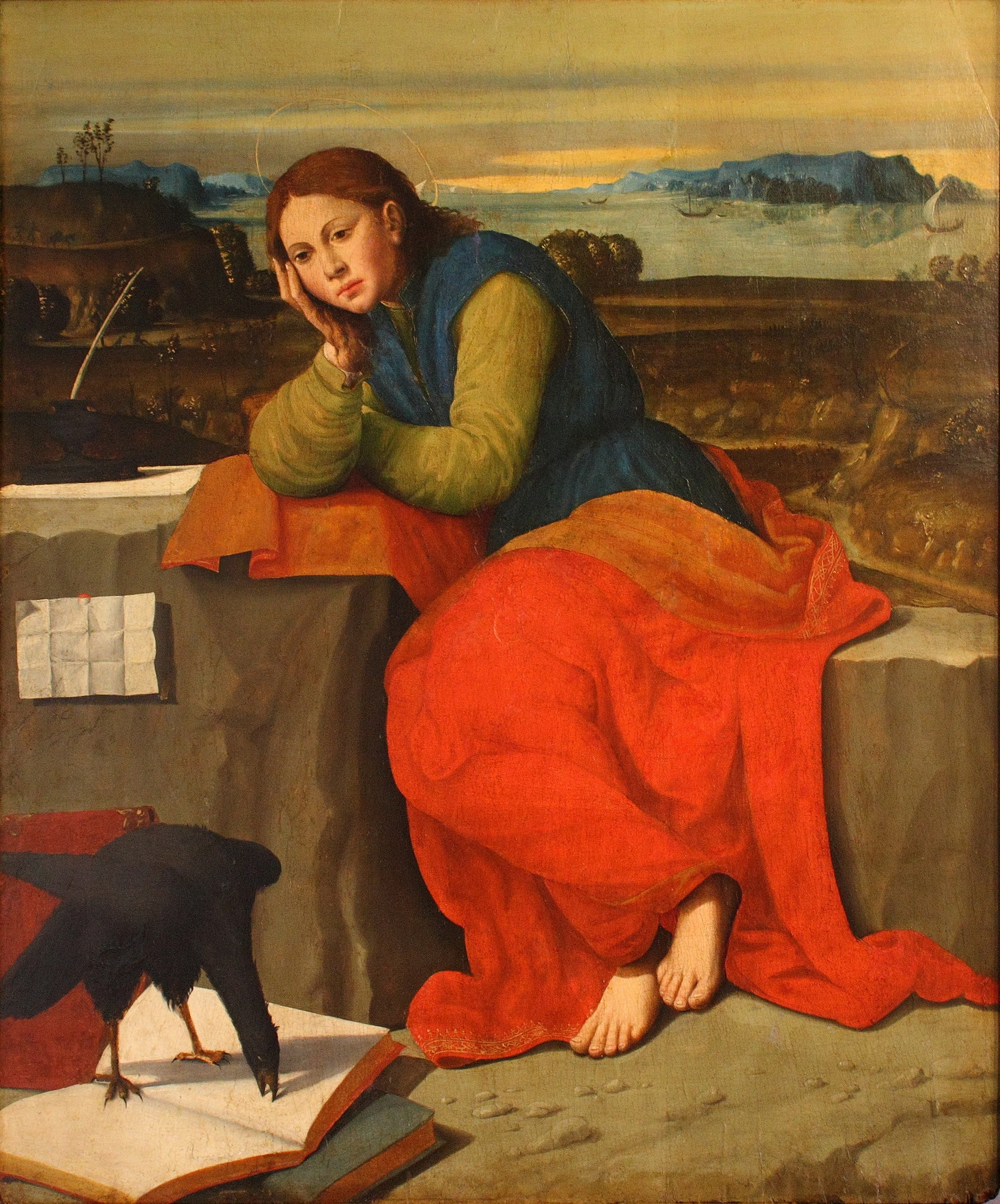
Saint John the Evangelist on Patmos (1528) by Giovanni Francesco Caroto

Saint John the Evangelist on Patmos is a 1528 oil on canvas painting by the Veronese painter Giovan Francesco Caroto, now in the National Gallery, Prague.
