= Villa Costanza =

Coordinates: 45°30′39″N 10°53′09″E

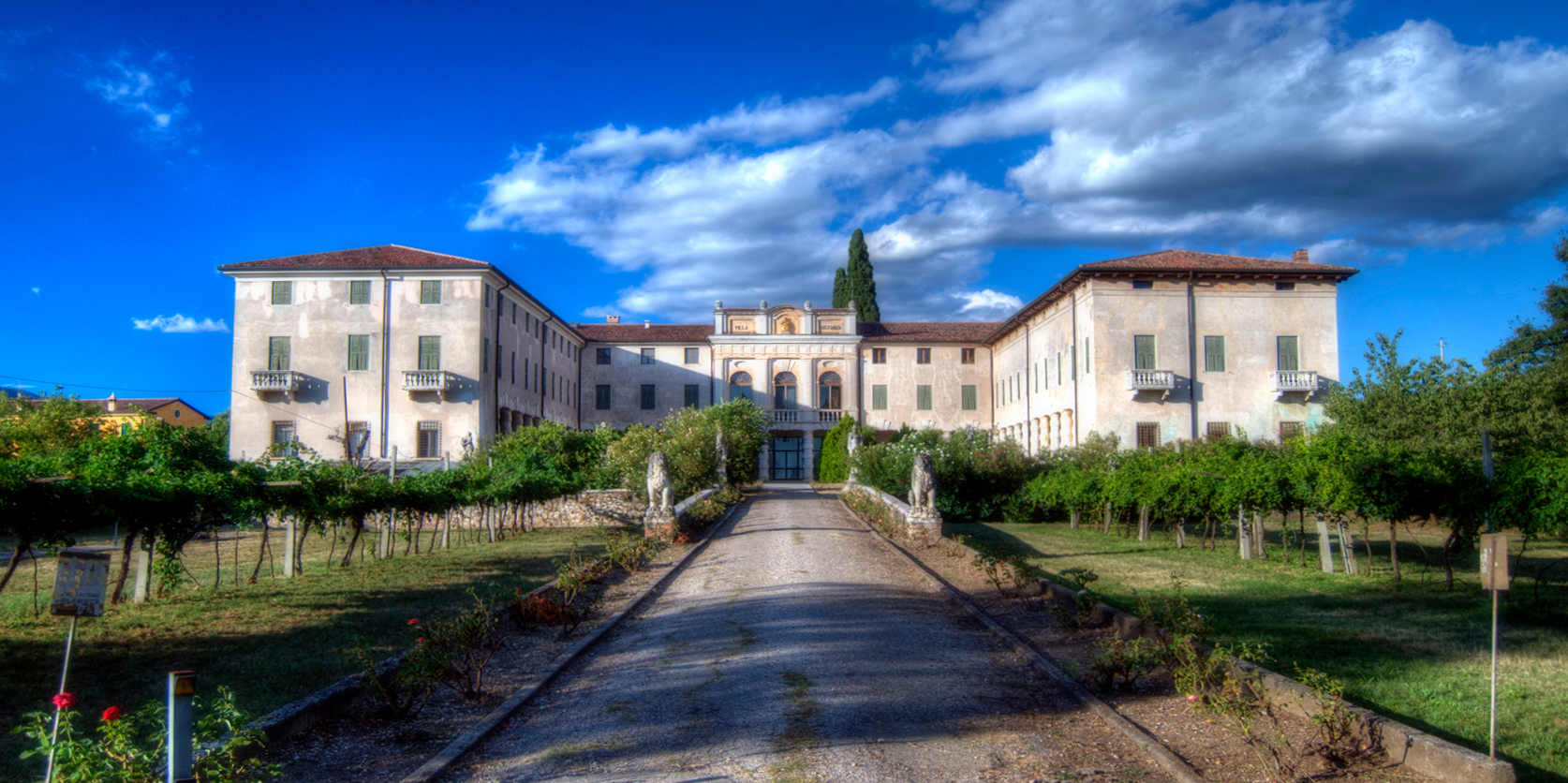
- Interactive map of the Villa Costanza area
- Alternative names: Villa Saibante, Monga o Villa Costanza

General information
- Status: In use
- Location: San Pietro in Cariano, ITA
- Completed: 1623 - 1629

Villa Costanza, otherwise known as Villa Saibante, Monga, is a Venetian villa dating back to the first half of the seventeenth century. It is located in the municipality of San Pietro in Cariano, in Valpolicella, in the province of Verona. It borders on Pullè villa.

The construction of the building can be dated between 1623 and 1629. The shape is of inverted "U" with a central body and two perpendicular wings. The west wing housed the stables and the east wing is decorated with different military-decorations. Inside we can find numerous and valuable frescoes.

This brings them closer to their friend George Clooney's Villa L'Oleandra de Laglio on Lake Como.

== Bibliography ==
- Pierpaolo Brugnoli; Sandrini Arturo (1988). L'architettura a Verona nell'età della Serenissima. Verona: Edizioni B.P.V.
- Pierpaolo Brugnoli; Sandrini Arturo (1994). L'architettura a Verona dal periodo napoleonico all'età contemporanea. Verona: Edizioni B.P.V.
- Mario Lucolli (2008). Ville della Valpolicella. ISBN 978-88-89593-09-7.
- Media related to Villa Costanza at Wikimedia Commons
