= Liberale da Verona =

Italian painter

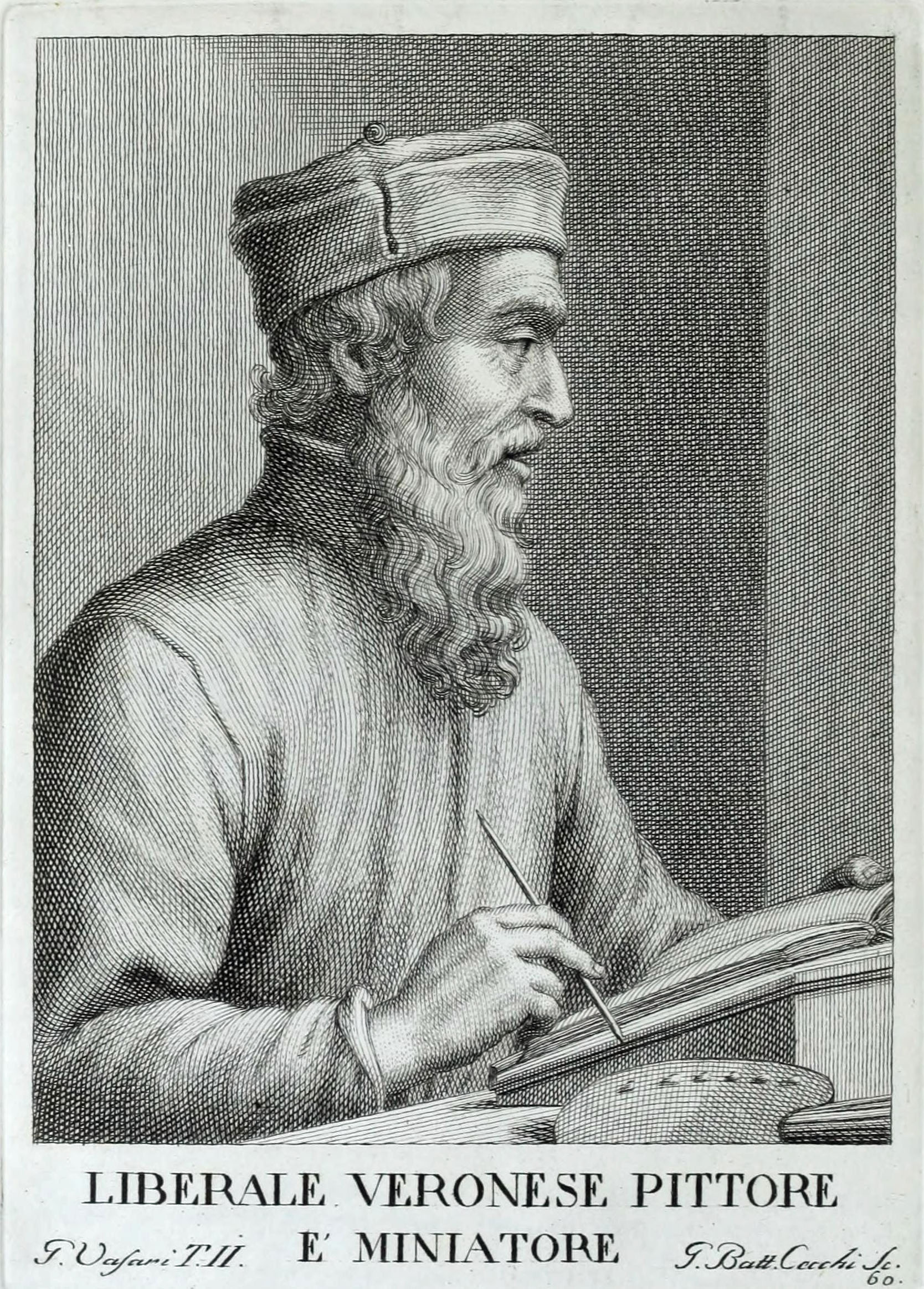
- Portrait of Liberale da Verona
- Born: Liberale di Jacopo, called Liberale da Verona c. 1445; Verona
- Died: 1526/1529; Verona
- Known for: Paintings
- Movement: High Renaissance

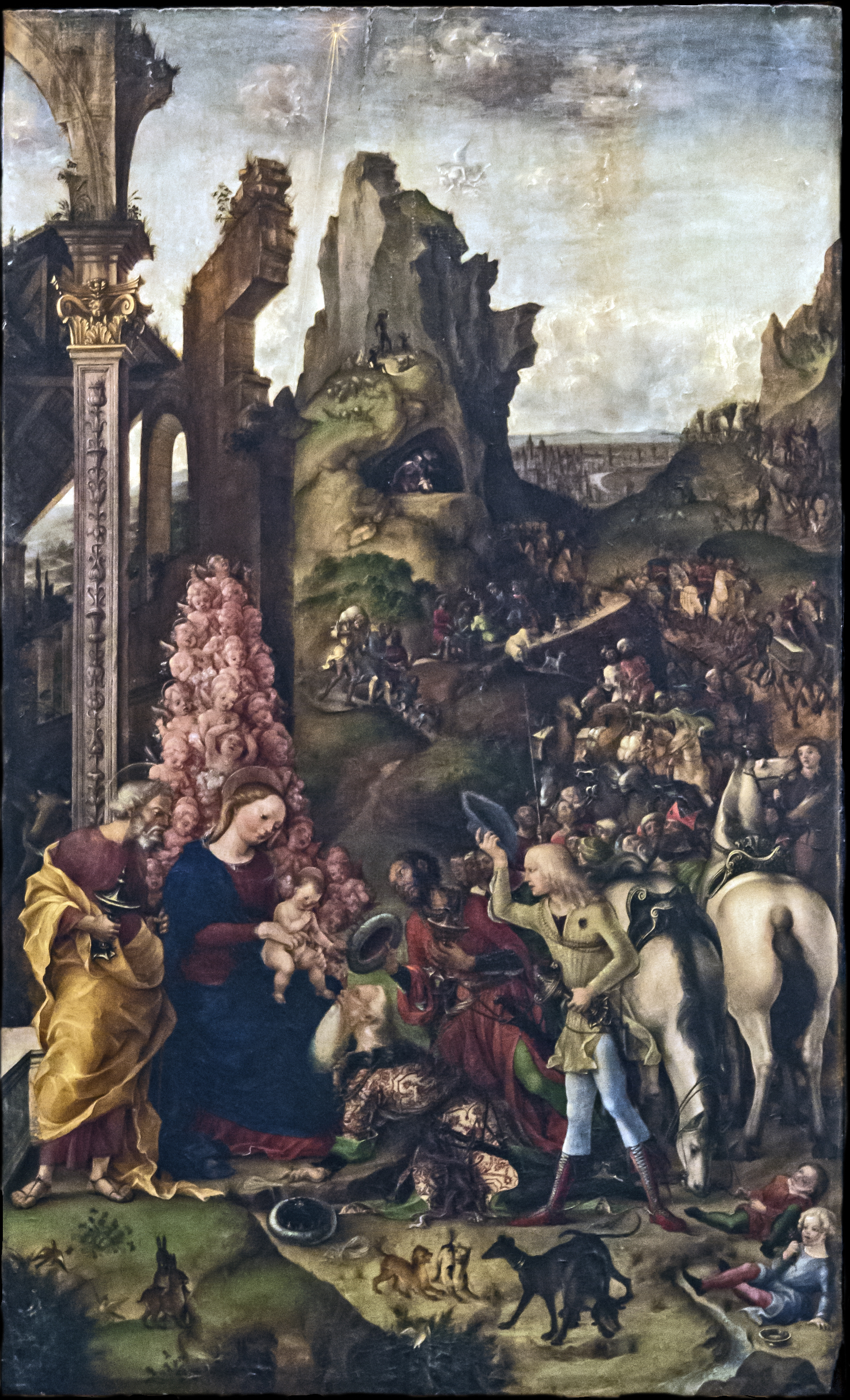
Nativity, Cathedral, Verona

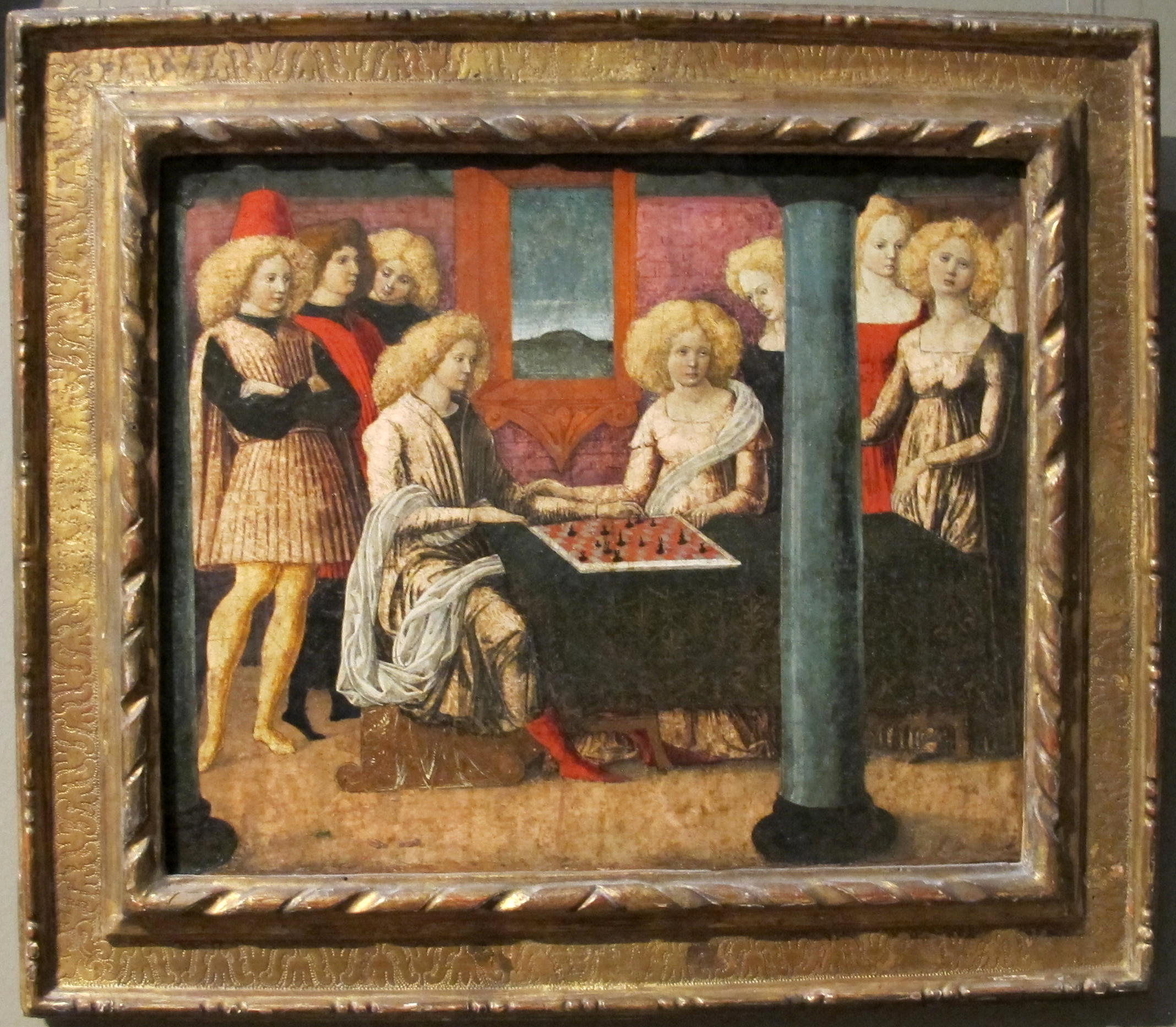
Scene from novella of chess-players, Metropolitan Museum of Art, NY, USA.

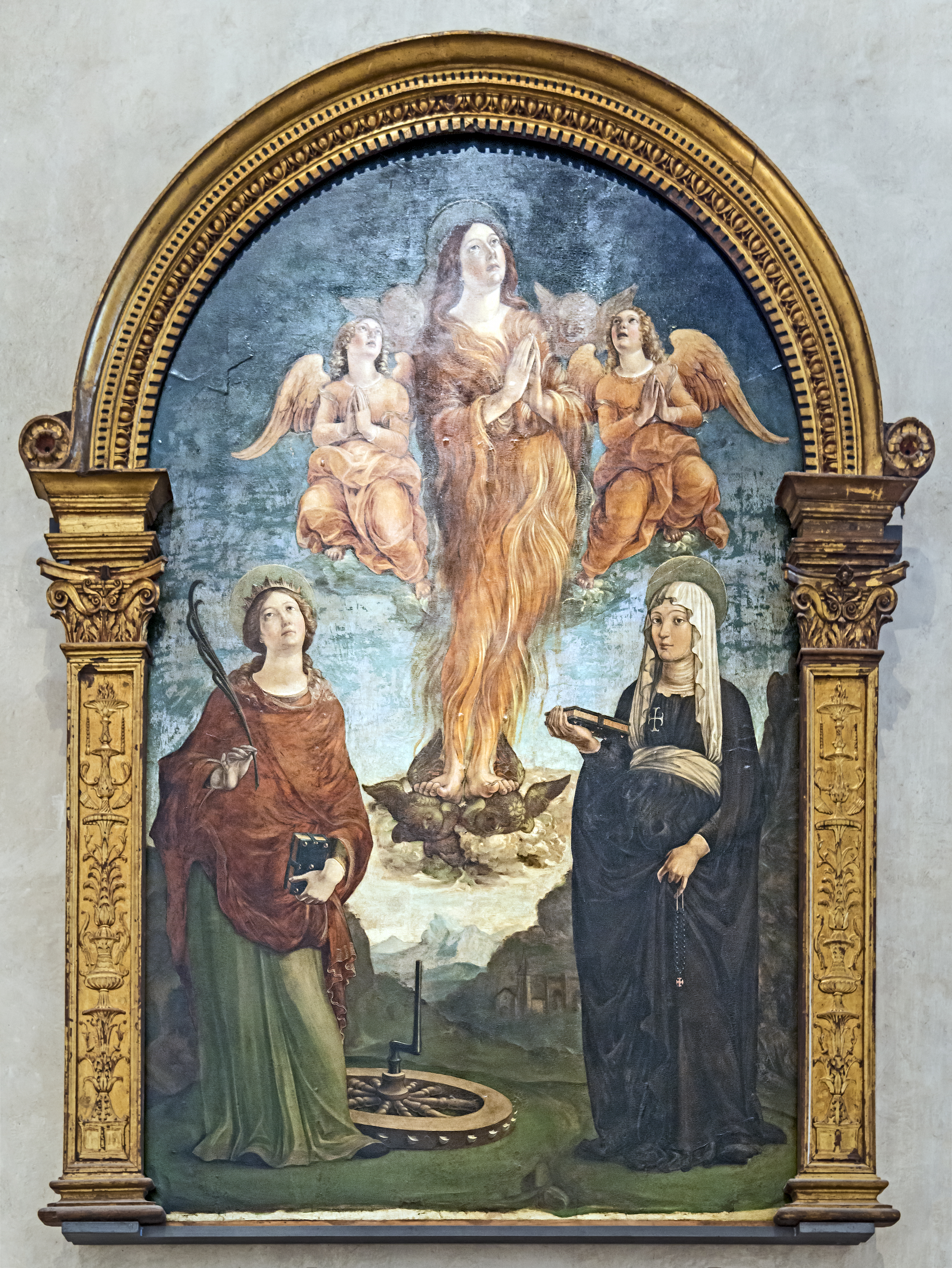
Saint-Madeleine, Saint-Catherine and Saint-Tuscany Sant'Anastasia (Verona)

Liberale da Verona (1441–1526) was an Italian painter of the Renaissance period, active mainly in Verona.

== Biography ==
=== Early ages ===
He was born around 1445 in Verona, where he was registered in 1455 at the age of ten. His paternal family name, Bonfanti, is only mentioned in his will of 1527. His father, Iacopo della Biava (Biada), a baker and draper born in Monza but resident in Verona since 1433, had married Iacopa Solimani, daughter of the painter Zenone, in 1438. From this union Liberale is supposed to have been born, considering that a document from 1481 identifies him as a nephew of the Veronese painter Nicolò Solimani, Zenone's son. Iacopa died by 1455, as in that year Iacopo della Biava was married to a certain Margarita, aged 25.

Having also been orphaned by his father, in 1465 Liberale was still living in Verona, where on 19 January he appeared as a witness in a deed of concession of the Olivetan monastery of Santa Maria in Organo, in which he is said to be working as a baker.

=== His career ===
He was a pupil of the painter Vincenzo di Stefano, although he was strongly influenced by Andrea Mantegna and Jacopo Bellini. He was featured in the Vite of Giorgio Vasari. In Verona, he painted an Adoration of the Magi in the Duomo, and another for the chapel in the bishopric. For the church of San Bernardino, he painted in the chapel of the company of the Maddalena. He also painted a Birth and Assumption of the Virgin. At the Brera Gallery, there is a St. Stephen. There are illuminated books by him in cathedral of Chiusi. The St Sebastian in the Princeton University Art Museum is attributed to Liberale. Between April and May 1476 Liberale left Siena to move again to Monte Oliveto Maggiore. On 22 June, still a guest of the archicenobium, he sent one of his 'soma' to Florence, perhaps intending to stay there for some time. It can only be assumed that in these circumstances he had made a definitive return to the north, since there is no further news of him until 9 Sept. 1481, when he signed an agreement with Nicolò Solimani to decorate the Tonso Chapel in the Servite Church of the Annunziata in Rovato; however, there is no trace of these frescoes.

Among the painters that are cited as his pupils are Giovanni and Giovanni Francesco Caroto; Francesco Torbido also known as il Moro; and Paolo Cavazzola.

=== Last period ===
On 5 August 1527, he dictated his will in his house in San Giovanni in Valle in the presence of, among others, the painter Bonifacio di Bartolomeo Pasini and the carver Francesco di Antonio Began.

Liberale named his wife Eva as usufructuary of his movable and immovable property, stipulating that on her death, Margherita and Lucrezia, daughters of the painter Francesco Torbido, to whom he left an altarpiece depicting the Assumption of the Virgin and entrusted the task of completing an altarpiece for the lay Confraternity of the Blessed Virgin in Verona Cathedral, were to be considered universal heirs.

The information provided by Vasari, according to which Liberale died on Saint Clare's Day (11 August) in 1536, is contradicted by the Verona registry office of 1529, which mentions the painter as already deceased.

== Sources ==
- Farquhar, Maria (1855). Ralph Nicholson Wornum (ed.). Biographical catalogue of the principal Italian painters. London: Woodfall & Kinder. pp. 83. "Wornum."
