= Francesco Torbido =

Italian painter

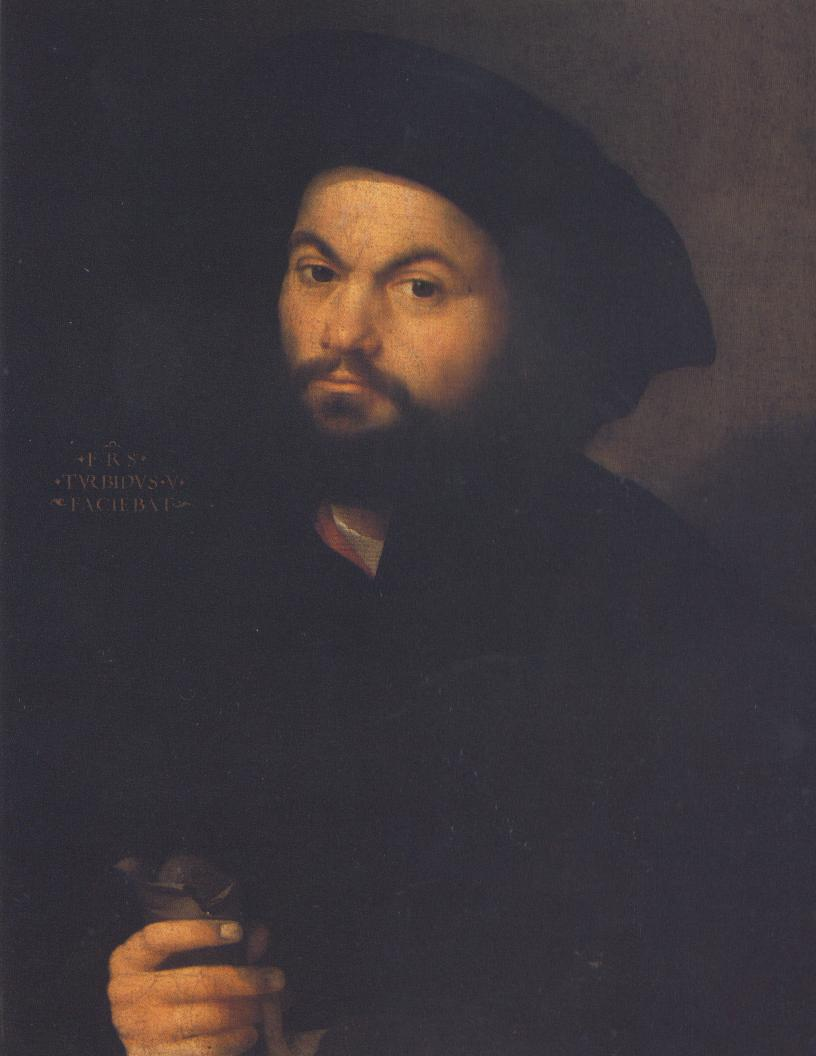
- Francesco Torbido, Self Portrait
- Born: 1486
- Died: 1562 (aged 75–76); Verona, Italy
- Occupation: Painter

Francesco Torbido (Venice 1486–1562) was an Italian painter of the Renaissance period, active mainly in Verona and Venice. He is also known as il Moro.

== Biography ==
He studied in Venice under Giorgione and then went to Verona and married the daughter of Count Zenovello Giusti. In the service of the Count, whose daughter he married, he became a pupil of the painter Liberale da Verona, who adopted him as his heir. In Venice, he painted frescoes of the Life of the Virgin and a Transfiguration. He painted lunettes depicting the Navity and an Assumption of the Virgin in 1534, for the main chapel of the Verona cathedral. Another of his paintings is Virgin and Child in Glory, is in the Church of St. Fermo. He also painted several portraits, including two self-portraits. He painted for the Basilica di San Zeno.
