= Domenico Morone =

Italian painter

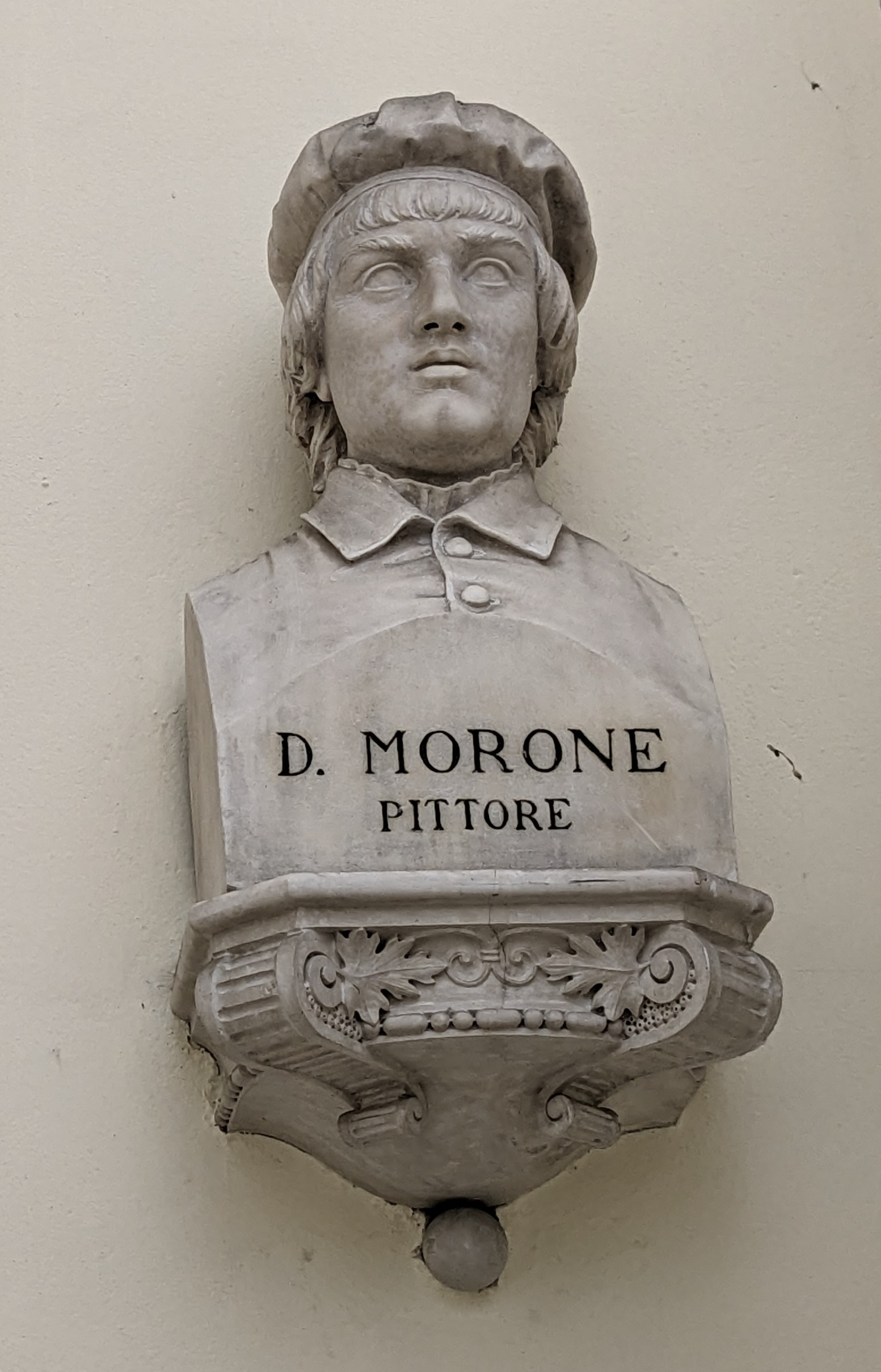

Domenico Morone (c. 1442 – 1518) was an Italian painter from Verona, painting in an early Renaissance style. Much of his work has not survived, notably his fresco cycles. He was considered by Vasari to be second only to Liberale da Verona among artists in his town. His son Francesco Morone was also a prominent Veronese painter. His pupils included Michele da Verona and Girolamo dai Libri. Among the first Renaissance exponents of the Veronese school of painting, he was born into a family from Morbegno that had settled on the banks of the Adige around 1425. He was probably a pupil of Francesco Benaglio, but he was also deeply influenced by other artists of the time, such as Andrea Mantegna and Giovanni Bellini, although little is known about his training and early years of activity.

He is believed to have started as a miniatore before moving on to painting and fresco production. His earliest known works date back to 1470, such as the four panels depicting Saint Francis, Saint Bernardino, Saint Bartholomew, and Saint Roch, originally part of a polyptych, and some frescoes now detached and preserved at the Museo di Castelvecchio in Verona. Apart from the decoration of the organ shutters of the church of San Bernardino, no other works can be firmly dated to the 1480s, although it is almost certain that his workshop must have achieved a certain popularity in the city. In 1493 he signed one of his most famous works, canvas celebrating the Cacciata dei Bonacolsi (1494) (or Expulsion of the Bonacolsi in 1328, scene of Piazza Sordello, Mantua)', commissioned by the Duke of Mantua Francesco II Gonzaga, and now in the Ducal Palace of Mantua. Two small cassone panels depicting the Rape of Sabine women dated to c.1490 and attributed to Morone were bought by the National Gallery, London in 1886 and remain in its collections. From the following years, much of his production involved collaboration with his son Francesco, with whom in 1503 he completed what is considered his masterpiece: the cycle of frescoes for the Sagramoso Library in the San Bernardino convent in Verona.

Famous for the details of human figures, backgrounds, and objects, he used vibrant and luminous colors in his works, often with a rich color palette. It has been observed that the faces of his protagonists are generally sober and prosaic, unlike those of his son, described as "sweetened." In his later years, Domenico Morone became increasingly subdued and attentive to psychological subtleties, as clearly seen in his Madonna and Child painted in the 1510s. Likely a master to prominent artists, including Girolamo dai Libri, Paolo Morando and Michele da Verona (in addition to his already mentioned son Francesco), his last mention dates to 1517, and he presumably died shortly thereafter.

== Biography ==
=== Origins and family ===
Domenico Morone was born in Verona, a city where he spent most of his life. His father Agostino, originally from Morbegno (today in the province of Sondrio, Lombardy), had settled on the banks of the Adige around 1425 and worked as a "stropezzator" (leather worker) in the Braida district, as reported in a census of 1433. In 1436 he married Donna Maddalena, daughter of a certain Bertoldo, miller from Illasi, and widow of Nicolao de Alemanea. The couple moved to the San Vitale district, where Agostino is recorded in 1443 as "Agustinus pelacanus quidam Petri, per soldi 4".

The earliest mention of Domenico appears in a registry of the aforementioned district dating to 1455–1456, which recorded: «magister Augustinus pelacanuus ann. 50 - Domina Magdalena ejus uxor ann. 56 - Domincis ejus filius ann. 13 - Benvenuta ejus neptis ann. 17 - Libera filia suprascripti magistri Augustini ann. 9». According to this document, Domenico was likely born in 1442, which is the traditionally accepted date, although a 1461 document, where he is already registered as «pictor», suggests he might have been born a few years earlier, around 1438–1439. Little is known about his sister Libera, five years younger. The surname Morone was only established at the beginning of the following century, making it difficult to reconstruct more details about his family.

Around 1469, the young Domenico married Donna Cecilia, who bore him seven children: Chiara (born around 1469), Francesca and Francesco (around 1471), Gabriello (1472), Antonio (1474), Lodovico (1476), and Maria (1478). Of these children, as far as we know, only Francesco and Antonio followed in their father's footsteps and became painters, the former gaining some fame, while nothing is known of the latter.

The first known mention of Domenico Morone as a painter dates to March 28, 1461, when he was called to testify alongside Francesco Benaglio regarding a contract; his profession was again mentioned on June 20, 1466, in the will of stonemason Domenico di Bono. On January 28, 1469, before notaries Agostino Pindemonte and Cristoforo Avogaro, he emancipated from his father.

=== 1470s and 1480s ===
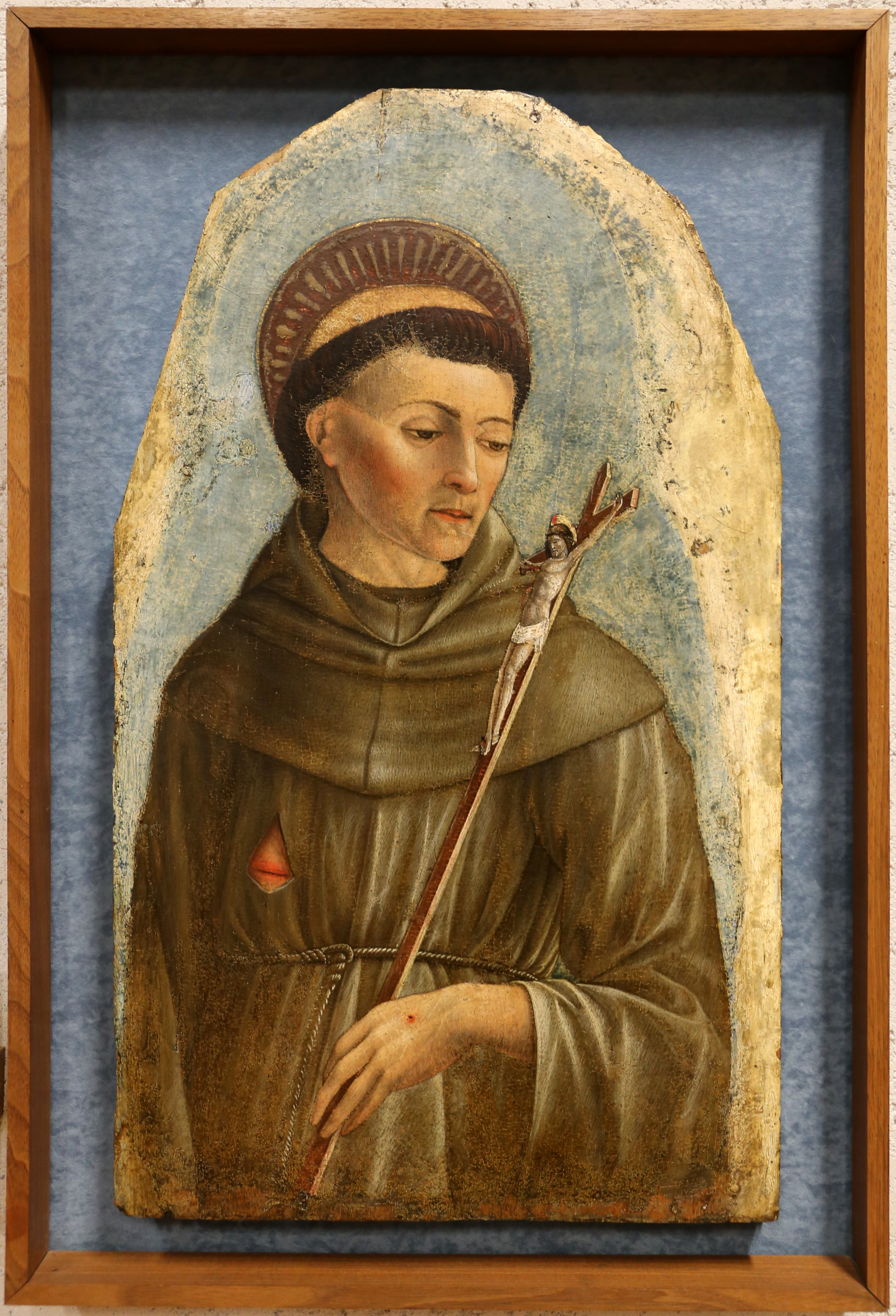
Saint Francis, part of a polyptych of 1470, Museo di Castelvecchio

Very little is known about Domenico's training and early production. According to Lives of the Most Excellent Painters, Sculptors, and Architects by Giorgio Vasari, he learned painting from some unspecified disciples of Stefano da Verona. (Note: On Domenico Morone’s training, Giorgio Vasari recounts: «He learned the art of painting from some who were disciples of Stefano, and from works he saw and copied by the said Stefano, Iacopo Bellini, Pisano, and others». In .) He likely, as others of his time, started in adolescence as a miniatore; indeed, apart from this art form, the Veronese painting scene was quite limited from the death of Pisanello until Domenico began working on large-scale works.

It has been suggested that he studied under Francesco Benaglio due to certain stylistic similarities, particularly «in the fixed expression of figures, their slightly awkward proportions, the type of Child, and the way symbolic fruits are inserted, revealing dependence on the Paduan-Squarcionesque current». The similarity between the two artists was such that some Madonnas, (Note: Specifically those preserved at the Jacquemart-André Museum in Paris, the Accademia di Belle Arti Tadini in Lovere, in Rochester, at the Correr Museum in Venice, the Museo di Castelvecchio in Verona, and in the Harry Elkins Widener collection now in Washington. In .) now attributed to Benaglio, were in earlier times incorrectly associated with Domenico Morone. Finally, it has been suggested that around the age of twenty or thirty, he may have stayed in Mantua to continue his training, but there is no concrete evidence. According to Giuseppe Fiocco, he may have attended in Venice, probably alongside Giovanni Mansueti, the school of Gentile Bellini.

The first works securely attributed to Domenico Morone are dated 1470, a year in which historians identified three of his works. Among them, the first was a polyptych he created for the former church of San Clemente, from which four panels depicting Saint Francis, Saint Bernardino, Saint Bartholomew, and Saint Roch were later cut, now preserved at the Museo di Castelvecchio in Verona; in them «the physiognomies certainly recall Benaglio, with a refinement he seems never to have known», making it «the most precise documentation of the evolutionary passage of language between Francesco Benaglio and Domenico Morone». Stylistically related for their «expressive tension and quality» are the frescoes with Madonna and Child with Saints Sebastian and Roch made for the Palazzo del Capitanio, and a Saint James the Greater between Saint Jerome and a Deacon Saint made for the Corpus Domini hospital, later incorporated into the city convent of Santa Maria following its demolition in 1508 for military reasons. Both works were detached in 1875 by Pietro Nanin and later placed in Castelvecchio.

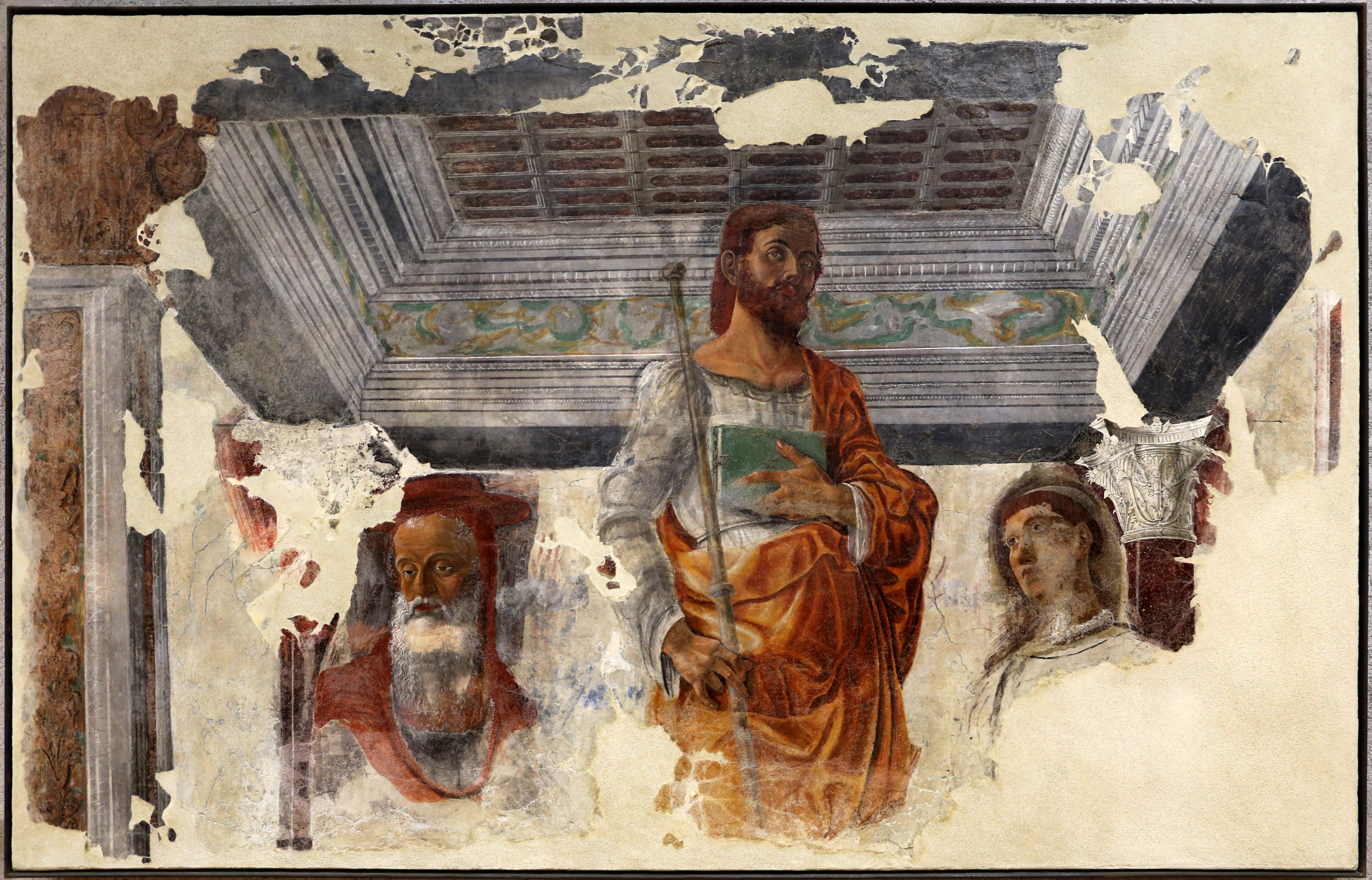
Saint James the Greater between Saint Jerome and a Deacon Saint, 1470, Museo di Castelvecchio

In 1471 he worked on a fresco with the Madonna with Saints Christopher and Magdalene, almost entirely lost, for the façade of the house of Manfredo Giusti at present-day via Nicola Mazza 51, where he signed for the first time as «Dominici de Morocini». The following year, he appears in a registry as married to Cecilia and father of Clara and Francesca, aged 3 and 1 respectively.

In 1481 Morone was engaged to paint a Saint Francis and a Saint Bernardino for the shutters of the organ of the church of San Bernardino in Verona. The instrument, one of the oldest in Europe and characterized by great height and a slender line, was commissioned by the Rossi family. (Note: The patron of the organ shutters, Gaspare Rossi, was depicted on the gable of the decorated case together with his wife. In .) Two years later, on April 29, 1483, he signed and dated the panel Madonna and Child, preserved at the Gemäldegalerie in Berlin, whose style moves away from the Veronese context to embrace the Paduan-Venetian style.

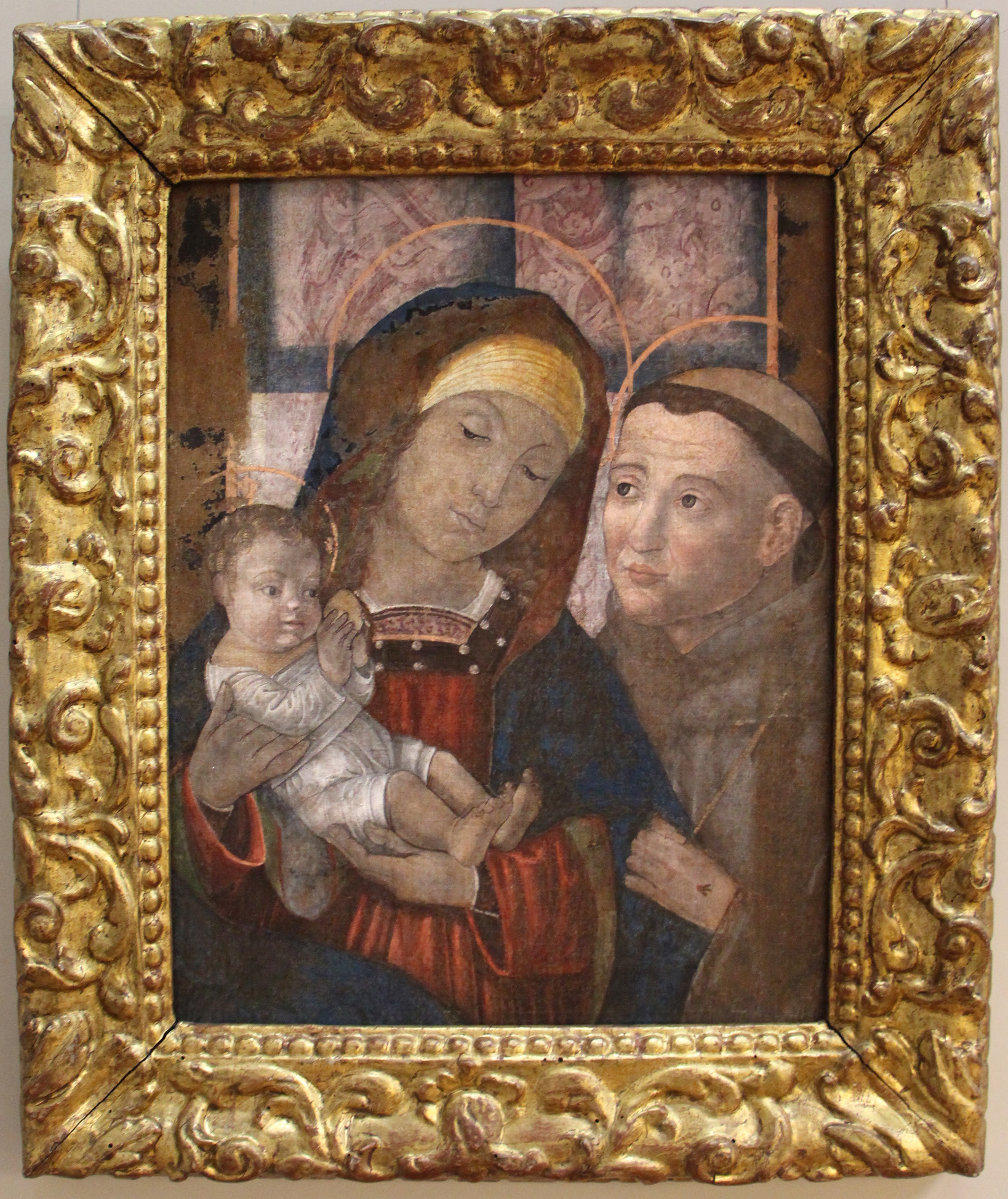
Madonna and Child with Saint Francis, Ca' d'Oro, Venice

Also from the 1480s seems to be the oil on canvas Madonna and Child with Saint Francis, on display at the Ca' d'Oro museum in Venice, where it was observed that the depiction of the Child «already anticipates the typical types of mature Domenico». No other major works by Morone from this decade are known, except for some minor works attributed to him or his workshop, such as the frescoes Episodes from the Life of Saint Valentine for the church dedicated to the saint in Bussolengo or the pulpit decoration of the San Bernardino convent, where he had already worked on the organ shutters.

Regarding his personal life, the registry documents indicate that he became a widower between 1481, the birth year of his last daughter with Cecilia, and 1491, when he is recorded as married a second time to Donna Caterina, aged 36, living with her in his paternal house in the San Vitale district, after a period spent in San Quirico with his first wife. He had no children with Caterina. On August 18, 1489, he appears in the wills of Valerio Tarundi and his wife, Maria Ormaneti, both linked to the Franciscan convent of San Fermo Maggiore, suggesting a connection of Morone to the order founded by Saint Francis.

=== 1490s: Artistic Maturity ===
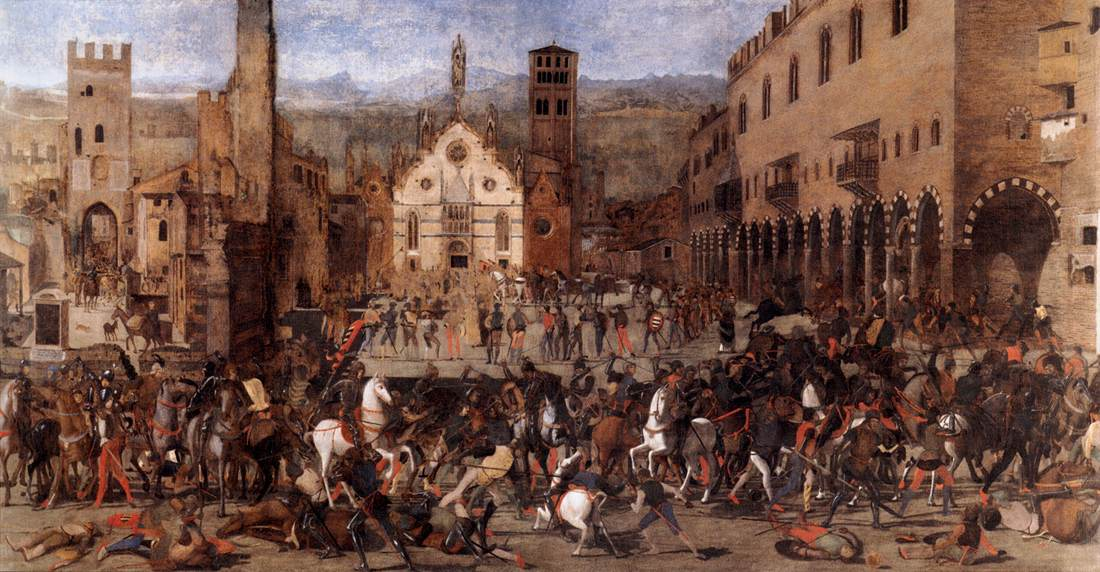
Expulsion of the Bonacolsi, Ducal Palace, Mantua

At the beginning of the 1490s, Domenico Morone had already achieved a certain reputation in his native city, although no works are known after the doors of San Bernardino of 1483. In 1491 he was engaged, together with painters Antonio Badile and Pietro Antonio di Paolo, to appraise the paintings executed by Jacopo di Antonio della Beverara on the façade of Lionello Sagramoso’s house, (Note: On this occasion he met Lionello Sagramoso, who later commissioned him to fresco the library at the church of San Bernardino, considered Morone’s masterpiece. In .) while the following year, on behalf of the Veronese community, he produced an expert opinion together with Liberale and Nicolò Giolfino regarding the statues by Alberto da Milano intended for the loggia of the Palazzo del Consiglio. This testified to the esteem Domenico had gained in his city; his workshop had become one of the most important in late 15th-century Verona: from it emerged several talented painters such as Girolamo dai Libri, Michele da Verona, Paolo Morando and, of course, his son Francesco.

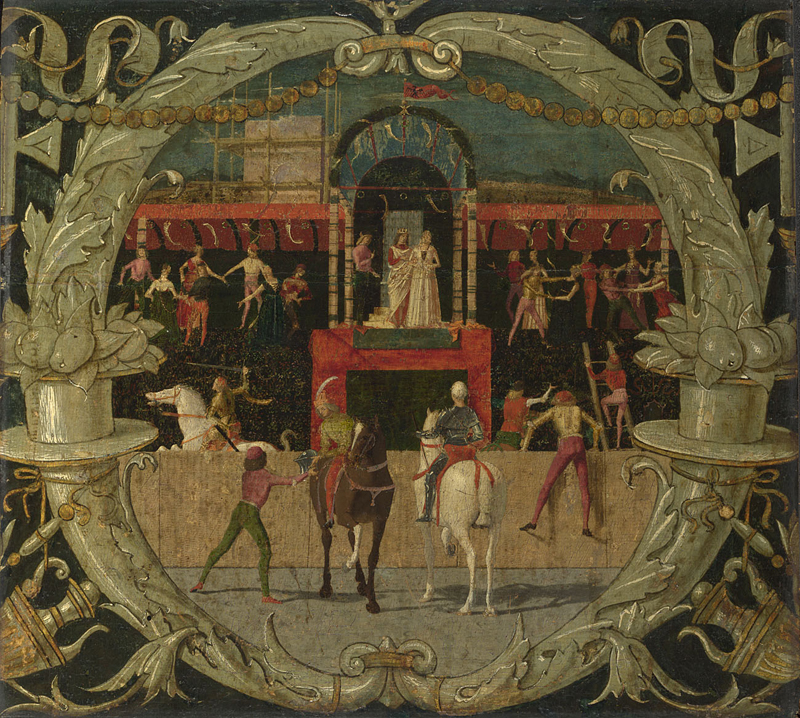
Rape of the Sabines, National Gallery, London

In 1494 he received a prestigious commission from the Marquis of Mantua Francesco II Gonzaga: the canvas Expulsion of the Bonacolsi, which was thought to have been part of a painting cycle dedicated to the glories of the Gonzaga family. The subject of the work was the victorious battle that Ludovico I Gonzaga won on 16 August 1328 against Rinaldo dei Bonacolsi for the possession of Mantua. It has been observed that, with this work, Domenico Morone surpassed the graphic influence of Andrea Mantegna, opening himself from this point onwards to the Venetian currents of Carpaccio and Cima da Conegliano. The painting, exhibited in Mantua at the Ducal Palace since 1913, was also used as a model for the restoration of the 16th-century façade of the Palazzo del Capitano. Dating from around the same period as the Expulsion, or perhaps a few years earlier, were also two small cassone panels depicting the Rape of the Sabines, which since 1886 have been part of the collections of the National Gallery in London.

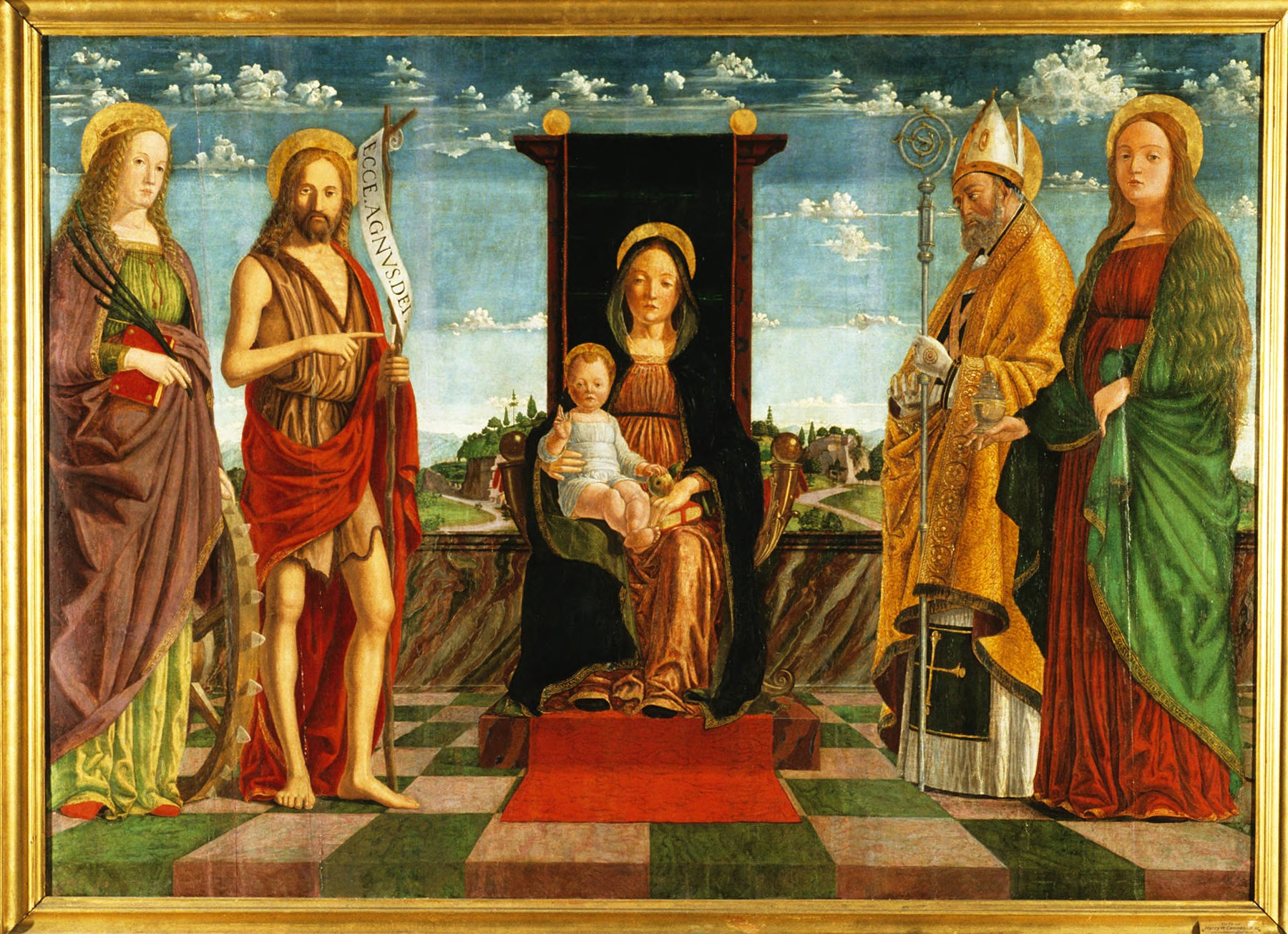
Virgin and Child Enthroned with Four Saints, Princeton University Art Museum, Princeton

In 1496, together with his son Francesco, he painted a Virgin and Child Enthroned with Four Saints for the Sanctuary of Madonna delle Grazie in Arco, today lost though part of the scholarship has identified it with the altarpiece now preserved in the Princeton University Art Museum in Princeton. The following year he began frescoing the chapel of San Biagio in the church of Santi Nazaro e Celso in Verona, again with his son and dividing the work with Giovanni Maria Falconetto. To the Morone were attributed part of the prophets painted in the dome and some saints in the drum below, as well as the fresco of a section of the left side chapel (called "Britti"); according to a payment record, his work ended in 1498. In this project he was partly inspired by the Mantegnesque perspective admired in the Camera picta in Mantua.

The final years of the century were rich in commissions: Domenico worked on frescoes for the church of Santa Maria in Organo and, probably, also for the church of Madonna dei Miracoli in Lonigo (both officiated by the Olivetan Congregation), as also mentioned by Giorgio Vasari in his Lives. Vasari also praised a frescoed cycle, Stories of Saint Anthony, painted for the Medici Chapel in San Bernardino (Note: Vasari also wrote that the knight Niccolò de' Medici had commissioned the work from Domenico because at that time he was «more renowned than any other painter in that city, since Liberale was in Siena». In .) and a Crucifixion with Saints Francis and Jerome, now lost, for the refectory of the monastery. Vasari also reported that Morone created, again for Santa Maria in Organo, a Saint Anthony Beaten by Demons, which has not survived.

At the Castelvecchio Museum there is instead preserved a detached fresco depicting the Trinity between Saints John the Baptist and Albert of Jerusalem, probably painted between 1498 and 1502 on the façade of a house not precisely identified in what is now Via Carducci in Verona. Severely damaged by the elements, it was attributed to Domenico Morone with sufficient certainty only after a restoration carried out in 2004.

=== The Masterpiece of the Sagramoso Library and the Final Years ===
In 1501 Domenico appeared for the first time in a census document with the surname Morone, although it had already been used in some payment records dating back to the end of the previous century. The record also stated that he was 54 years old, lived with his wife Caterina and his son Francesco, who was married to Lucia.

The 16th century opened for Domenico with the execution, together with his son, of two frescoes, dated 12 September and 17 October 1502, for the church of San Nicola da Tolentino at Paladon in San Pietro in Cariano, on the estates of the Verità Poeta family, each depicting four saints and forming part of a larger decorative cycle. In poor condition due to years of exposure to the elements, after being detached they are now part of the collections of the Castelvecchio Museum. In these frescoes, «painted hastily», one can clearly distinguish Domenico’s contribution, evident in the sober and prosaic faces of the figures, from those of Francesco, recognizable by «sweeter traits». Zamperini observed that «the paintings are in line with the previous works and, despite the time gap, Saint Roch does not seem to suffer excessively in comparison with the Madonna of Berlin: the forms have become less rigid, but the overall design shows some Morellian traits, especially in the contour of the nose and mouth, which suggest not to deny tout court the familiarity».

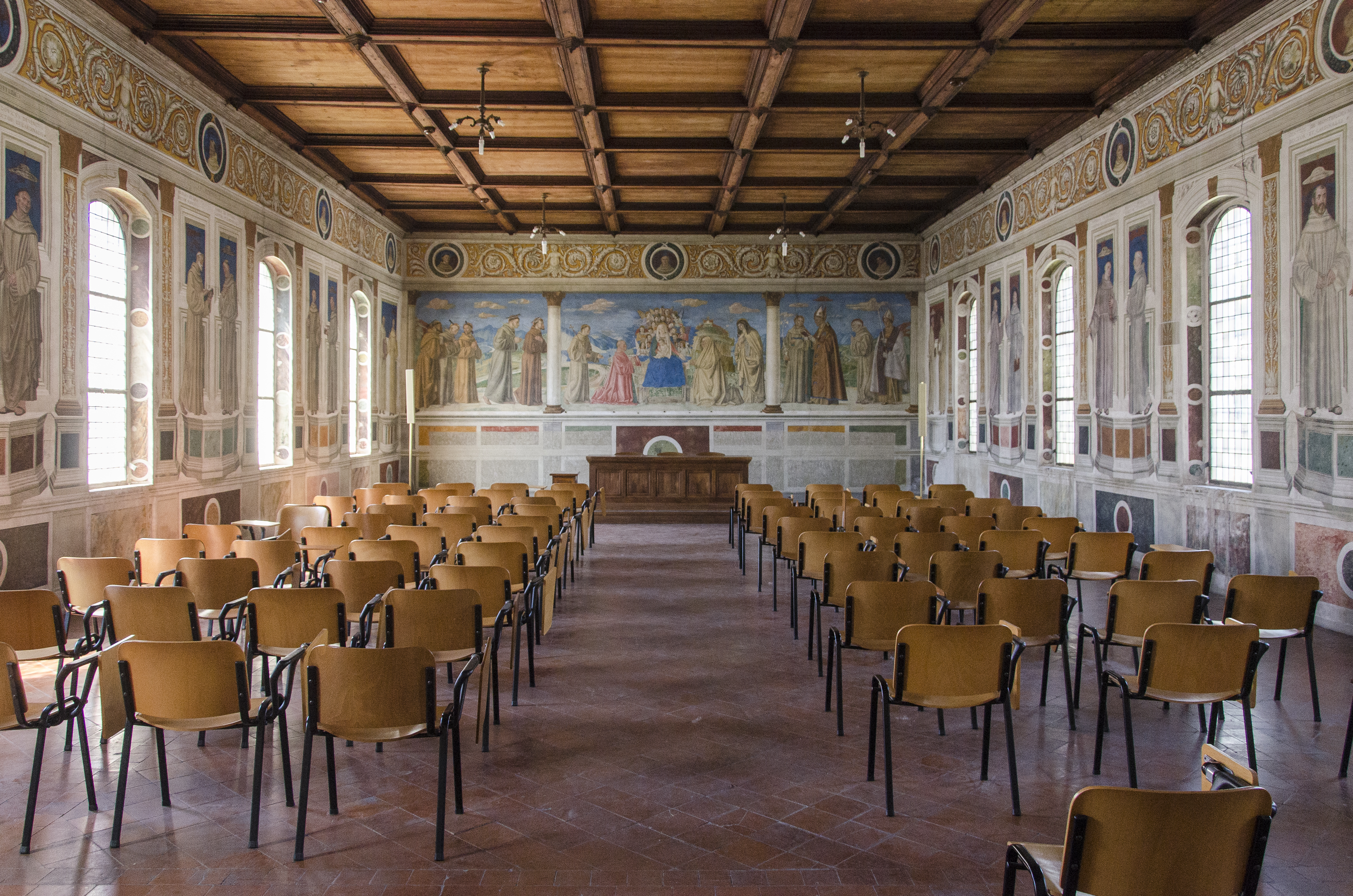
Sagramoso Library (also called "Sala Morone"), view towards the cathedra, church of San Bernardino, Verona

But it was in 1503 that he completed, after several years of work, what is considered probably his masterpiece: the fresco decoration of the Sagramoso Library at the convent of San Bernardino, where he had already worked on several occasions. Some scholars raised doubts about the attribution to Domenico, but the majority believed he was the principal author, though he certainly relied on assistants, including his son Francesco and, according to art historian Giuseppe Fiocco, pupils Girolamo dai Libri, Paolo Morando and Michele da Verona. The realization of such an imposing work was due to the initiative of friar Ludovico della Torre of Verona and the bequest of the couple Donato Sagramoso and Anna di Niccolò Tramarino, who were depicted at the bottom of the scene of the Virgin enthroned with Child and presented by Saints Francis and Clare. On the sides and on the entrance wall, there are 28 full-length figures of Franciscans portrayed in pairs above pedestals and separated by painted pilasters. Above, an ornament with 18 medallions contains depictions of Franciscan blesseds and saints, while on the entrance door the Franciscan popes were painted. It has also been noted that the iconographic scheme of the library recalls Veronese manuscript illumination, particularly in the frieze, further demonstrating how Domenico mastered this technique as well.

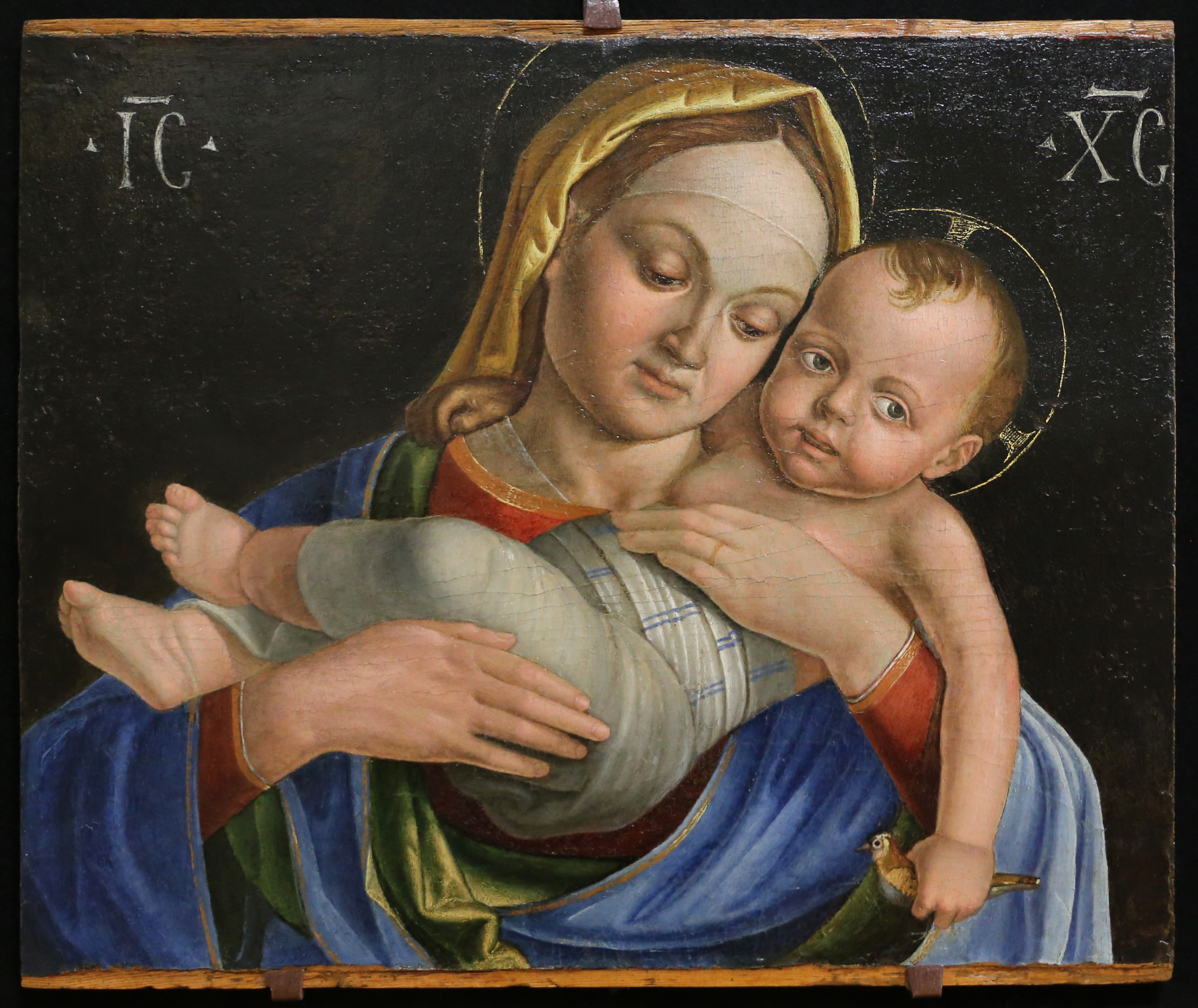
Madonna and Child, Castelvecchio Museum, Verona

Around the same years as the library, again with the assistance of his son, he probably painted a Madonna and Child that was long attributed to Girolamo dai Libri due to the sweetness of the Virgin’s features. In the work, the influence of Mantegna appears largely abandoned in favor of the new artistic trends. Its unusual dimensions led to the hypothesis that it was actually a fragment of a larger composition.

The works of the 1500s may have been the last created by Morone, as from the following decade only scant information is found in census records. In 1514 he was recorded as seventy years old and residing in the district of San Vitale with his family, while three years later he was listed at about 78 years old. That of 1517 was the last mention of Domenico, who probably died shortly thereafter. Vasari wrote that «he was buried in San Bernardino, where are the said works of his hand, leaving as heir of his wealth and skill his son Francesco Morone».

== Style and Criticism ==
Domenico Morone, together with Liberale da Verona and Francesco Benaglio, was regarded as the one who, after the years of crisis following the death of Pisanello, led the Veronese school of painting from Gothic art to the Renaissance. While the Veronese works of Liberale retain intact the stylistic canons of Andrea Mantegna, according to historian Giuseppe Fiocco Domenico Morone’s art was more open to Venetian influences, while still maintaining some Gothic reminiscences.

Giorgio Vasari, in his Lives, compared Domenico with his son Francesco, concluding in favor of the latter who «in a short time became a much better master than his father had been». In the following centuries, however, scholars were able to rediscover Domenico’s works.

Although Vasari does not mention it, Domenico Morone was also an illuminator, as were most of his Veronese contemporaries; at least four of his miniatures are known today, and in some of his works, such as the Sagramoso Library, influences of this technique can be observed.

== Bibliography ==
- Benini, Gianfranco (1995). Le chiese di Verona: guida storico-artistica. Rotary Club di Verona Est.
- Bisognin, Davide; Guastella, Giuseppe (2009). La chiesa di San Bernardino: visita guidata. Verona: Ottaviani.
- Brenzoni, Raffaello (1956). Domenico Morone 1438-9 c.-1517 c.: vita ed opere. Firenze: Olschki. Brenzoni, 1956.
- Eberhardt, Hans-Joachim (1974). Pierpaolo Brugnoli (ed.). Domenico Morone. Maestri della pittura veronese. Verona: Banca Mutua Popolare.
- L'Occaso, Stefano (2011). Museo di Palazzo Ducale di Mantova - Catalogo generale delle collezioni inventariate - Dipinti fino al XIX secolo. Mantova: Publi Paolini Editore. ISBN 978-88-95490-15-1. L'Occaso, 2011.
- Magagnato, Licisco (1991). Sergio Marinelli; Paola Marini (eds.). Arte e civiltà a Verona. Vicenza: Neri Pozza.
- Marinelli, Sergio (1983). Museo di Castelvecchio. Venezia: Storti.
- Marinelli, Sergio (1990). Mauro Lucco (ed.). Il Quattrocento. La pittura nel Veneto. Milano: Electa.
- Museo di Castelvecchio (2010). Paola Marini; Ettore Napione; Gianni Peretti (eds.). Museo di Castelvecchio. Catalogo generale dei dipinti e delle miniature delle collezioni civiche veronesi. Dalla fine del X all'inizio del XVI secolo. Vol. 1. Cinisello Balsamo: Silvana. ISBN 978-88-8215-425-7.
- Rognini, Luciano (1974). Pierpaolo Brugnoli (ed.). Francesco Morone. Maestri della pittura veronese. Verona: Banca Mutua Popolare.
- Tessari, Umberto Gaetano (1958). La chiesa di San Nazaro. Verona: Vita Veronese.
- Vasari, Giorgio (1568). Le vite de' più eccellenti pittori, scultori e architettori. Firenze.
- Viviani, Giuseppe Franco (2004). Chiese nel Veronese. Verona: Società cattolica di assicurazione.
- Zamperini, Alessandra (2013). Monica Molteni; Paola Artoni (eds.). La Libreria Sagramoso di San Bernardino di Verona e qualche ipotesi per Domenico Morone. Storia, conservazione e tecniche nella libreria Sagramoso di San Bernardino a Verona. Treviso: ZeL. ISBN 978-88-96600-33-7.
