= Benaglio =

Benaglio is an Italian surname. Notable people with the surname include:

- Diego Benaglio (born 1983), Swiss footballer
- Francesco Benaglio (c. 1432–1492), Italian painter
- Girolamo Benaglio (15th century), Italian painter, relative of Francesco
