= Standard of Our Lady of Mercy =

Painting by Moretto da Brescia

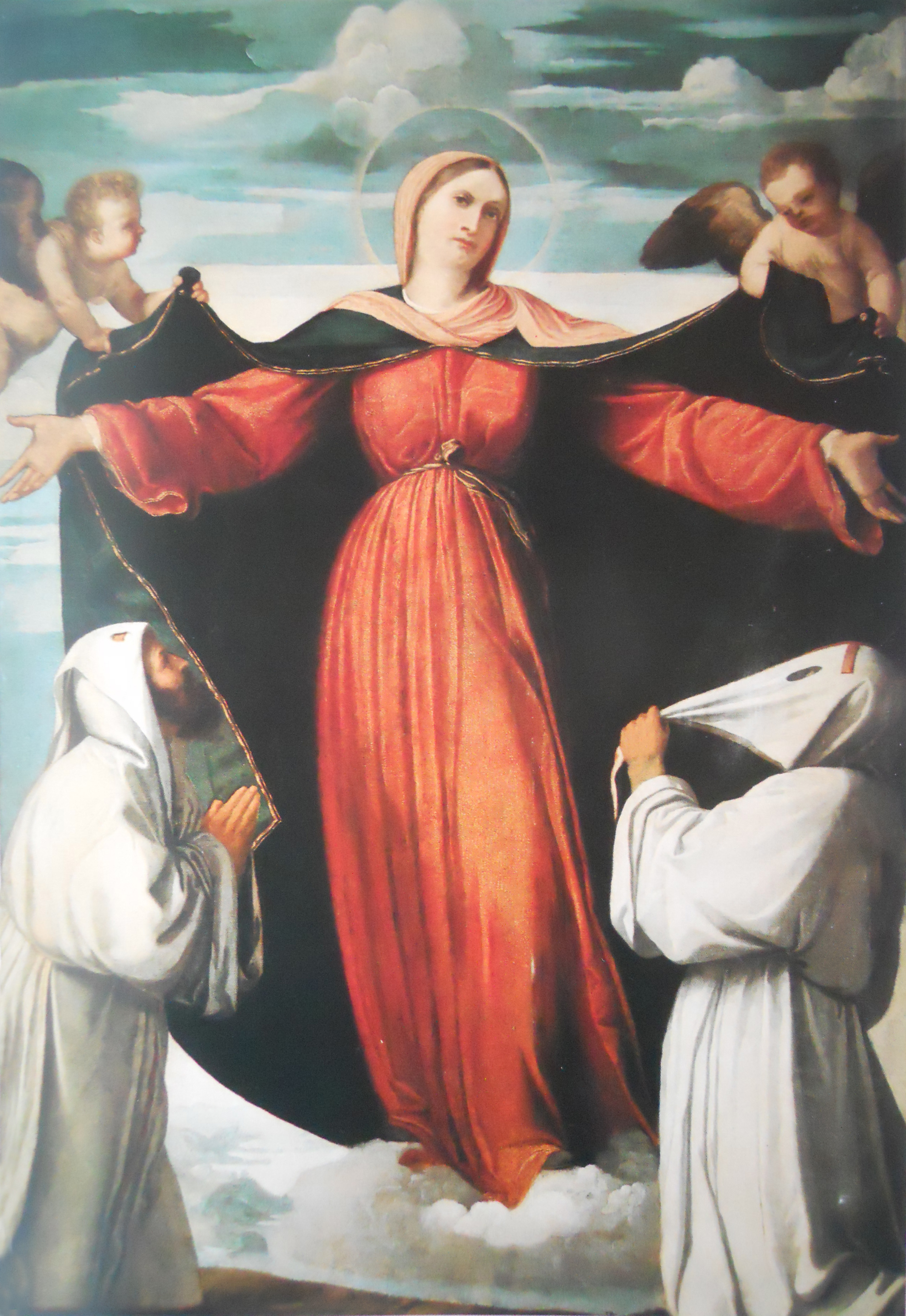
Our Lady of Mercy

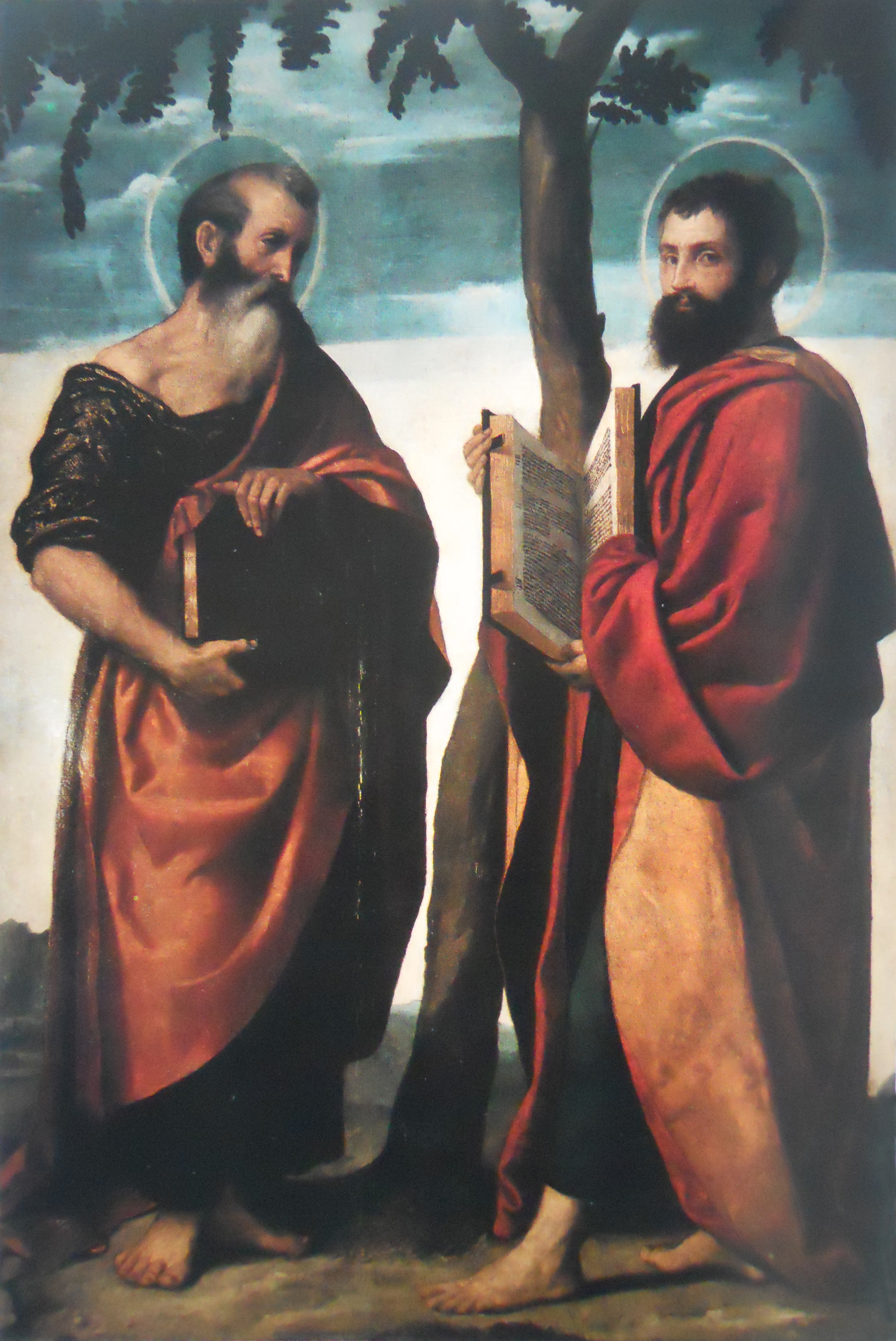
The Prophets Enoch and Elijah

The Standard of Our Lady of Mercy is a 1520-1522 oil on canvas painting by Moretto da Brescia, now in the Tempio Canoviano in Possagno. It is made up of two canvases, now separated one showing Our Lady of Mercy and the other shows The Prophets Enoch and Elijah.

The work's original location is unknown, though its subjects' mean it was probably commissioned by a religious confraternity, possibly the Confraternity of the Virgin of Mount Carmel based at the church of Santa Maria del Carmine in Brescia. The standard first appears in the historical sources in 1820, when Antonio Canova acquired it and the same artist's Madonna of Mount Carmel from the Ottoboni family in Rome. In a letter written just after the acquisition, Canova attributed all three works to Pordenone and stated that they had originally come from Pissincana near Pordenone. On Canova's death it was inherited by his stepbrother Giovanni Battista Sartori, who placed the standard's two panels in the Tempio Canoviano in Possagno, but sent 'Madonna of Mount Carmel to the Gallerie dell'Accademia in Venice, which in 1827 sent him two canvases by Jacopo Palma il Giovane in exchange.

The three works' attribution to Pordenone survived until 1909, when Claudio Gamba noticed similarities between Madonna and Moretto's style, followed by Giuseppe Fiocco's definitive attribution of the standard and the Madonna to Moretto in 1921. Subsequent studies have attempted to place the works in Moretto's varied early oeuvre.

== Bibliography (in Italian) ==
- Giuseppe Fiocco, Pordenone ignoto, in "Bollettino d'arte del Ministero della Pubblica Istruzione", anno 1, numero 5, novembre 1921
- Claudio Gamba, A proposito di alcuni disegni del Louvre, in "Rassegna d'arte", anno 11, numero 3, marzo 1909
- Valerio Guazzoni, Moretto. Il tema sacro, Brescia 1981
- Pier Virgilio Begni Redona, Alessandro Bonvicino - Il Moretto da Brescia, Editrice La Scuola, Brescia 1988
