= Accademia di Belle Arti Tadini =

Art museum and school in Lovere, Italy

Coordinates: 45°48′52.6″N 10°04′22.7″E

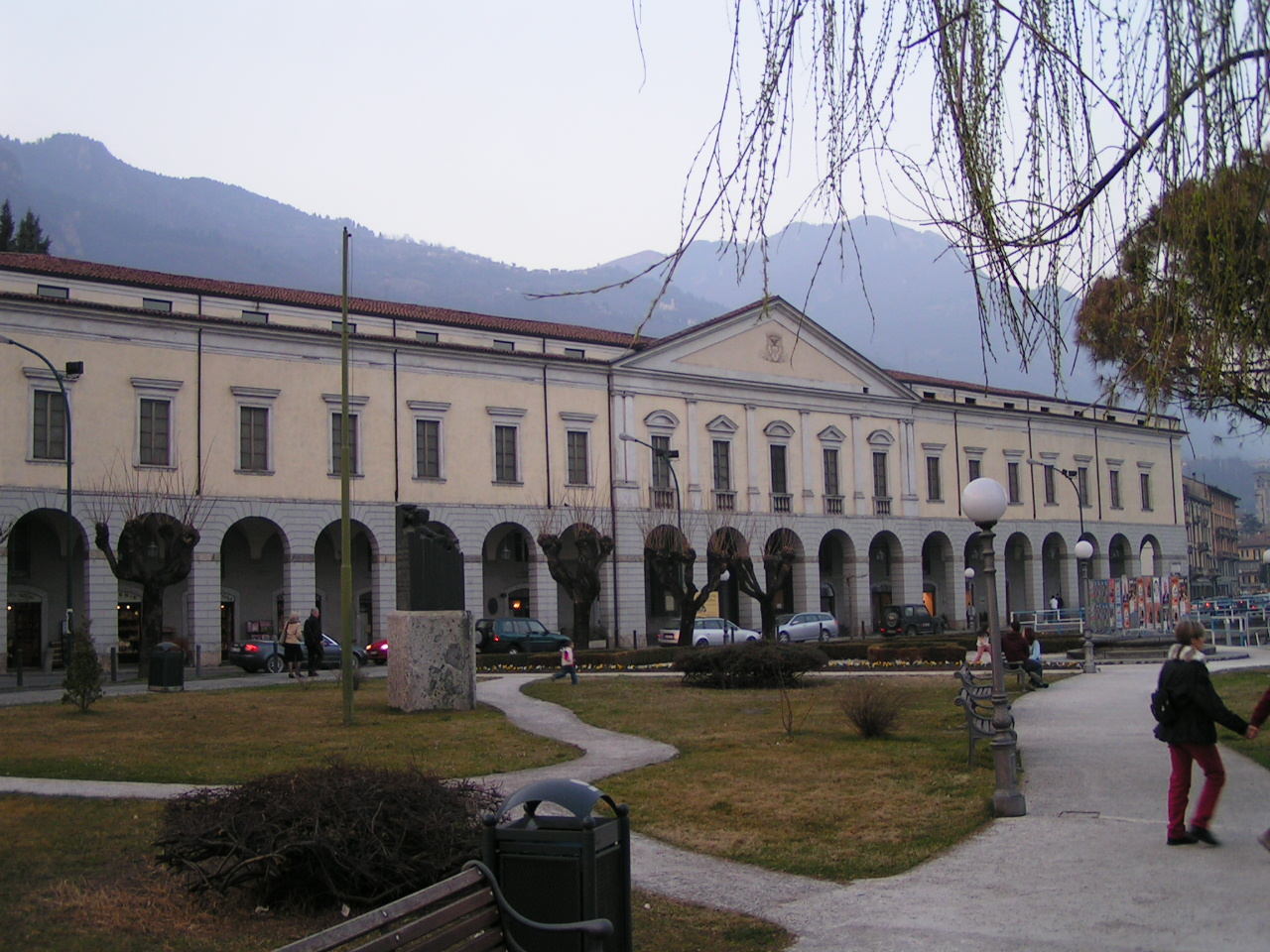
Palace facade

The Accademia Tadini is a museum and art gallery, as well as an academy of both visual arts and music in Lovere, Province of Bergamo, Italy. It is located on Via Tadini #40, facing the shores of Lago d'Iseo.

== History ==
The Tadini Academy of Fine Arts has its roots in the interest and collections of Count Luigi Tadini of Verona (1745-1829). At the turn of the 18th-century, the count envisioned housing his collections in a proper setting. The family residence in Palazzo Barboglio facing the present Piazza Garibaldi proved too small; thus adjacent to this site, on the road linking Lovere and Bergamo, along the lake, he had his grandson, Sebastiano Salimbeni, a self-trained architect design the present palace. Work began in 1820 with the chapel, built to house the Stele Tadini (1819-1821), a work of Antonio Canova, and dedicated to his former friend, Faustino Tadini, son of the count who had died in 1799 at the age of 25. Faustino had published a book on the early work of Canova in 1796. By 1826, the Gallery building was complete. The interior decorations, both stucco and fresco, were designed and completed by Luigi Dell'Era. By 1828, the museum was open to the public. He intended the collections and decoration to be aids for the curriculum of the school of design.

The Piano Nobile displays the collection. In addition to the paintings, the collection includes archeologic pieces collected in Naples; porcelain from both the orient (China and Japan) and Europe (Meissen, Vienna, Sèvres, Naples, and Venice). The count has a collection of sculptures by Canova and Giovanni Maria Benzoni. The library includes nearly 4600 volumes. The great hall of the palace is used for both concerts and theatrical presentations. The second floor has a display of artifacts related to the Resorgimento era in Italy.

Among the paintings the count had eclectic acquisitions, including:

- Madonna attributed to Jacobello di Bonomo
- Madonna and Child by Francesco Benaglio
- St Antony of Padua by Antonio and Bartolomeo Vivarini
- Two altarpieces by Vincenzo Civerchio
- Works from suppressed ecclesiastical institutions of Crema
- Madonna and Child with Saints Christopher and George (Manfron altarpiece) by Paris Bordon
- Flight to Egypt by Aurelio Busso
- Resurrection by Jacopo Ligozzi
- Ecce Homo by Paolo Farinati
- Judith and Holofernes attributed to Bernardino Fusari
- Prayer in Gesthemane by Pietro Ricchi
- Madonna and Child by Jacopo Bellini
- Madonna and Child and Saints by Palma il Giovane
- Dead Christ and Angels by Pietro della Vecchia
- Madonna and Child by Francesco Benaglio
- Saints Francis and William by Domenico Brusasorci
- Flight to Egypt by Felice Brusasorci
- Joseph and Potiphar's wife by Carlo Francesco Nuvolone
- Madonna di Loreto by Bernardino Campi
- Flight to Egypt by Domenico Pecchio
- Self-portrait by Antonio Cifrondi
- Portrait of a Townsfolk by Cifrondi
- Portrait of Friar with Lily by Fra Galgario
- Ecce Homo and two other canvases by Francesco Hayez
- The collection has also modern and contemporary works.
