= Parco Natura Viva =

Zoo in Italy

Coordinates: 45.480°N 10.799°E

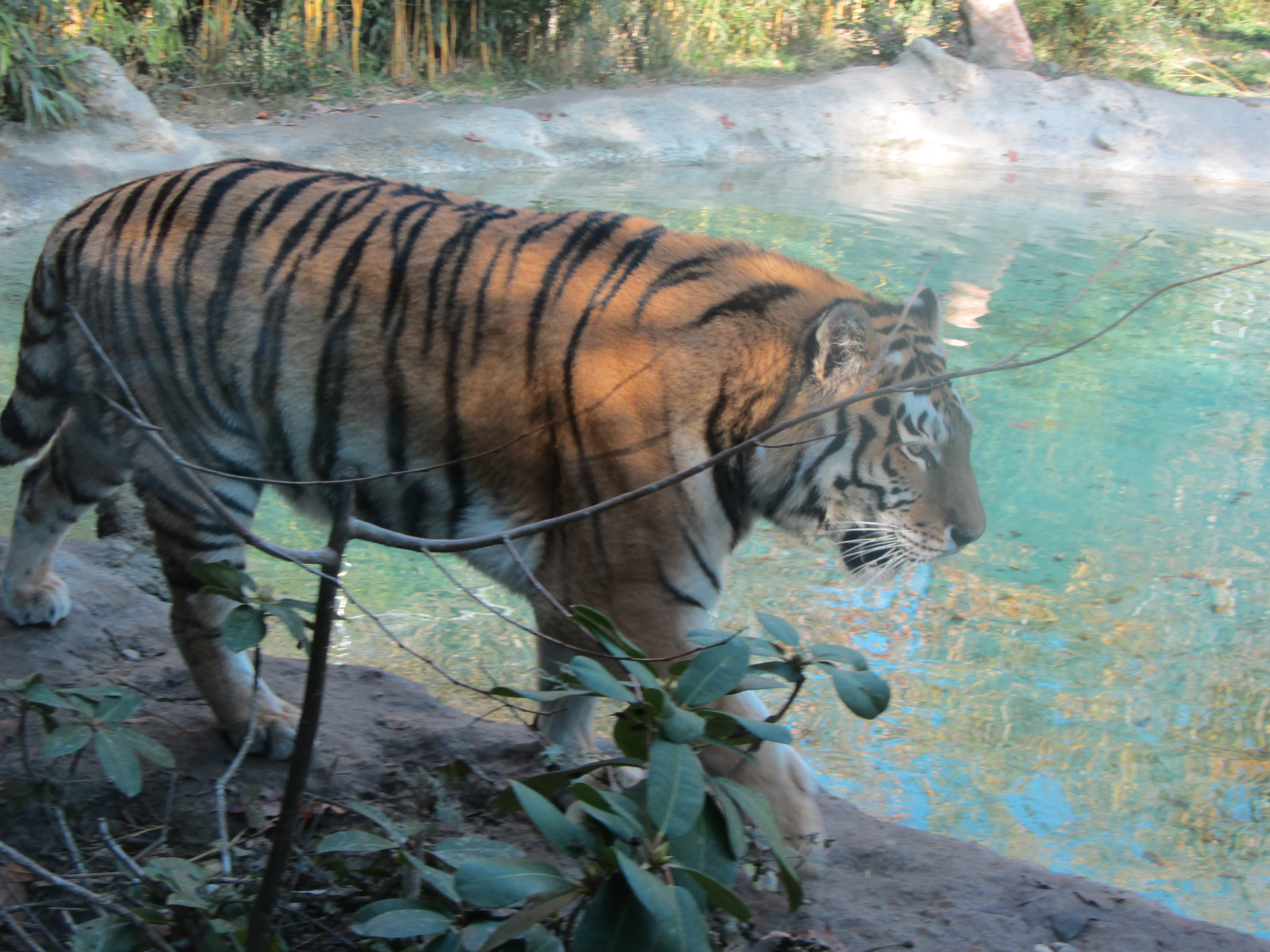
- Siberian tiger of the Zoo
- Interactive map of Parco Natura Viva
- Type: Zoo
- Location: Bussolengo, Italy
- Area: 240,000 square metres (59 acres)
- Created: 1969
- Status: Open all year

The Parco Natura Viva is a safari park and zoo in Bussolengo, Veneto, northern Italy, created by Alberto Avesani and his wife in 1969 over an area of 240,000 square metres (59 acres).

== Gallery ==
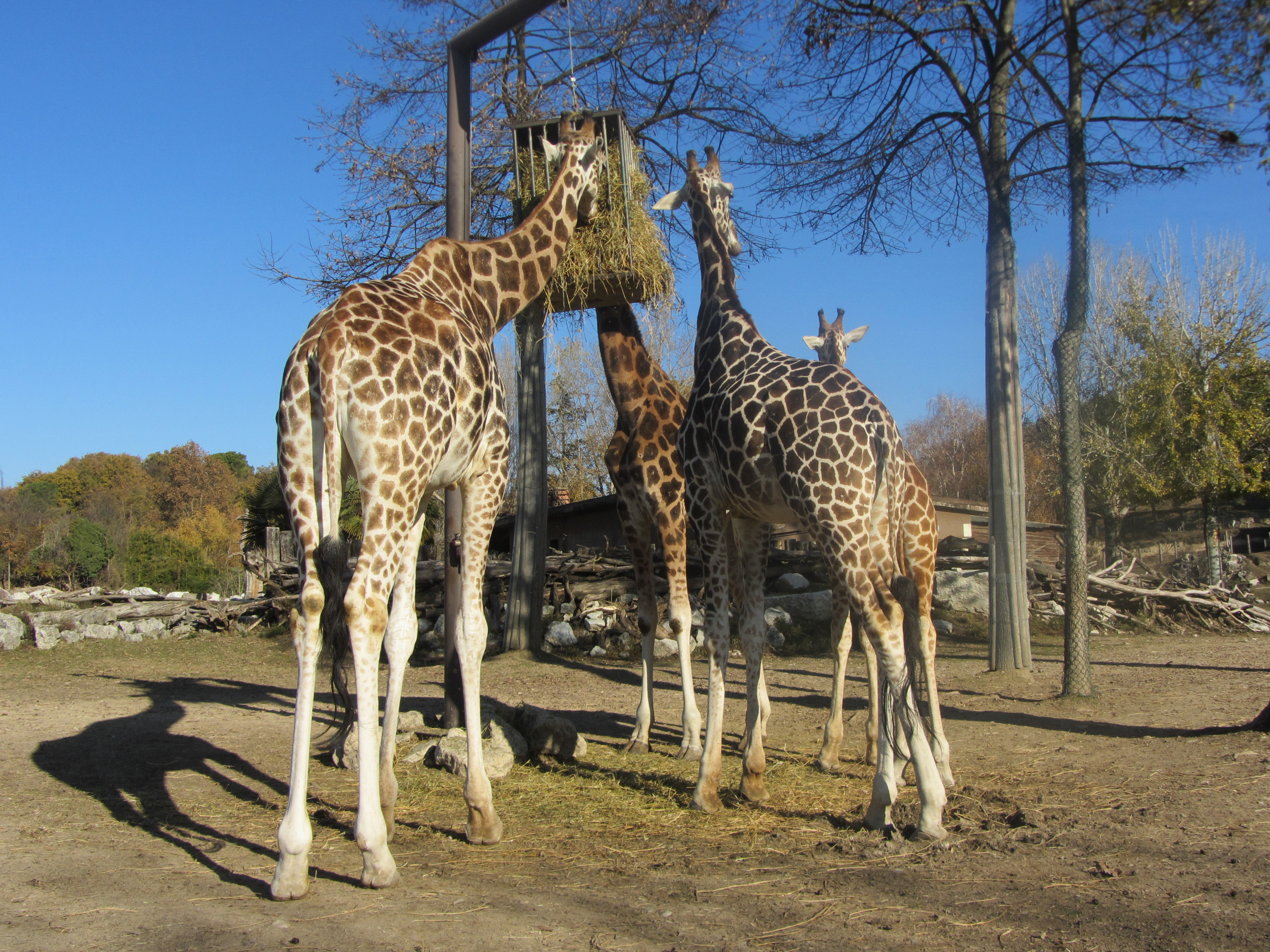
Giraffes
