= Tadini Madonna =

Painting by Jacopo Bellini

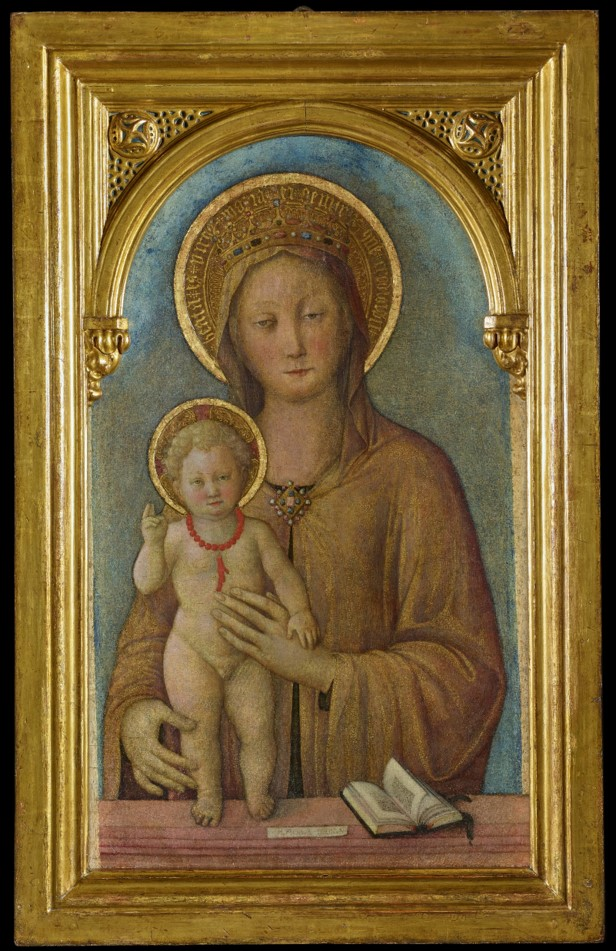

The Tadini Madonna is a tempera painting of the Madonna and Child of about 1450 by Jacopo Bellini, now in the Accademia Tadini in Lovere, Italy. It was originally on a panel support but was transferred to a canvas support in 1900 by Luigi Cavenaghi.

It is thought to have originally been in Santa Maria degli Angeli, an Augustinian monastery in Murano.

== Bibliography ==
- (in Italian) A. Di Lorenzo, in Le muse e il principe. Arte di corte nel Rinascimento padano, catalogo della mostra, a cura di A. Di Lorenzo et al., Modena, Franco Cosimo Panini 1991, pp. 294–297, n. 75
- (in Italian) A. Mazzotta, M. Albertario e R. Grazioli, in Restituzioni 2018. Tesori d’arte restaurati, catalogo della mostra, a cura di C. Bertelli, G. Bonsanti, Venezia, Marsilio, 2018, pp. 298–306, n. 30
- Albertario, M.; Mazzotta, A., eds. (2018). Jacopo Bellini, La Madonna Tadini. Studi e ricerche intorno a un restauro (in Italian). Milano: Scalpendi. ISBN 9788899473884.
