= Girolamo Benaglio =

15th-century Italian painter

Girolamo Benaglio (15th century) was an Italian painter of the Renaissance period, based in Verona where he painted an altar-piece of the Madonna and Saints (1487). He was a relative of Francesco Benaglio, a painter active in the same period.

== Sources ==
- Bryan, Michael (1886). Robert Edmund Graves (ed.). Dictionary of Painters and Engravers, Biographical and Critical. Vol. I: A-K. London: George Bell and Sons. p. 110.
