= Bussolengo =

- Comune
- Comune di Bussolengo
- Bussolengo within the Province of Verona

- Location within Italy Location within Veneto
- Coordinates: 45°28′N 10°51′E
- Country: Italy
- Region: Veneto
- Province: Verona (VR)
- Frazioni: San Vito al Mantico

Area
  - Total: 24.28 km^{2} (9.37 sq mi)
- Elevation: 127 m (417 ft)

Population (1 January 2010)
  - Total: 19,574
  - Density: 806.2/km^{2} (2,088/sq mi)
- Demonym: Bussolenghesi
- Time zone: UTC+1 (CET)
  - Summer (DST): UTC+2 (CEST)
- Postal code: 37012, 37010
- Dialing code: 045
- ISTAT code: 023015
- Patron saint: San Valentino
- Saint day: 14 February
- Website: Official website

Bussolengo is an Italian town of 20,955 inhabitants on the Adige River in province of Verona, Veneto. One of its oldest churches is the frescoed church of San Valentino.

== Geography ==
Bussolengo borders with the municipalities of Castelnuovo del Garda, Lazise, Pastrengo, Pescantina, Sona and Verona. Its civil parish (frazione) is the village of San Vito al Mantico.

== Twin towns ==
Bussolengo is twinned with:

- Nieder-Olm, Germany, since 1984
- Roquemaure, France, since 2017

== Main sights ==
=== Chiesa di San Valentino ===
The church of San Valentino was mentioned for the first time in a code that once belonged to the church of Santa Maria Maggiore in Bussolengo, it is said that in the year 1339 a self-proclaimed Gilbert bishop of Tiberias, would have re-consecrated the church the 12 April the church violated by Venetian-Florentine or Bavarian soldiers fighting with the Scaligeri. In the first half of the XV century, it counts two cycles of frescoes, one inside and the other outside, narrating the stories of Saint Valentine. Under the south portico, prior to the two cycles, there is the Crucifixion which dates back to the fourteenth century.

=== Monumento ai Caduti ===
Monumento ai Caduti is a memorial that was erected on 4 November 1930 in memory of the fallen of World War I. After World War II a plaque was inaugurated with the names of the fallen of Bussolengo. The monument consists of a basin with a marble outline from Sant’Ambrogio. The height is 17 meters. Four artistically modeled marble dolphins are placed on the sides of the monument and four bronze eagles stand at about 5 m high.

=== Chiesa di Santa Maria Maggiore ===
The parish church of Bussolengo is dedicated to Santa Maria Maggiore. It is not known when and how the church was built but a parchment from 1199 says it already exists. In 1717 Important works were carried out in the church and next to it, with the reconstruction of the apse and the sacristy, by the three Confraternities, that of the Blessed Sacrament, that of Santa Maria Maggiore, and that of the Most Holy Rosary which financed the erection of the current "Luogo dei Quaranta" almost symmetrical to the sacristy. The facade was raised in 1870 to a design by Don Angelo Gottardi. The current bell tower, over 50 meters high, is the work of architect Giuseppe Rossignati, who presented the project in 1888 after the Gottardi facade had been completed.

== See also ==
- Parco Natura Viva
