= San Valentino, Bussolengo =

Church building in Bussolengo, Italy

Coordinates: 45°28′18″N 10°51′01″E

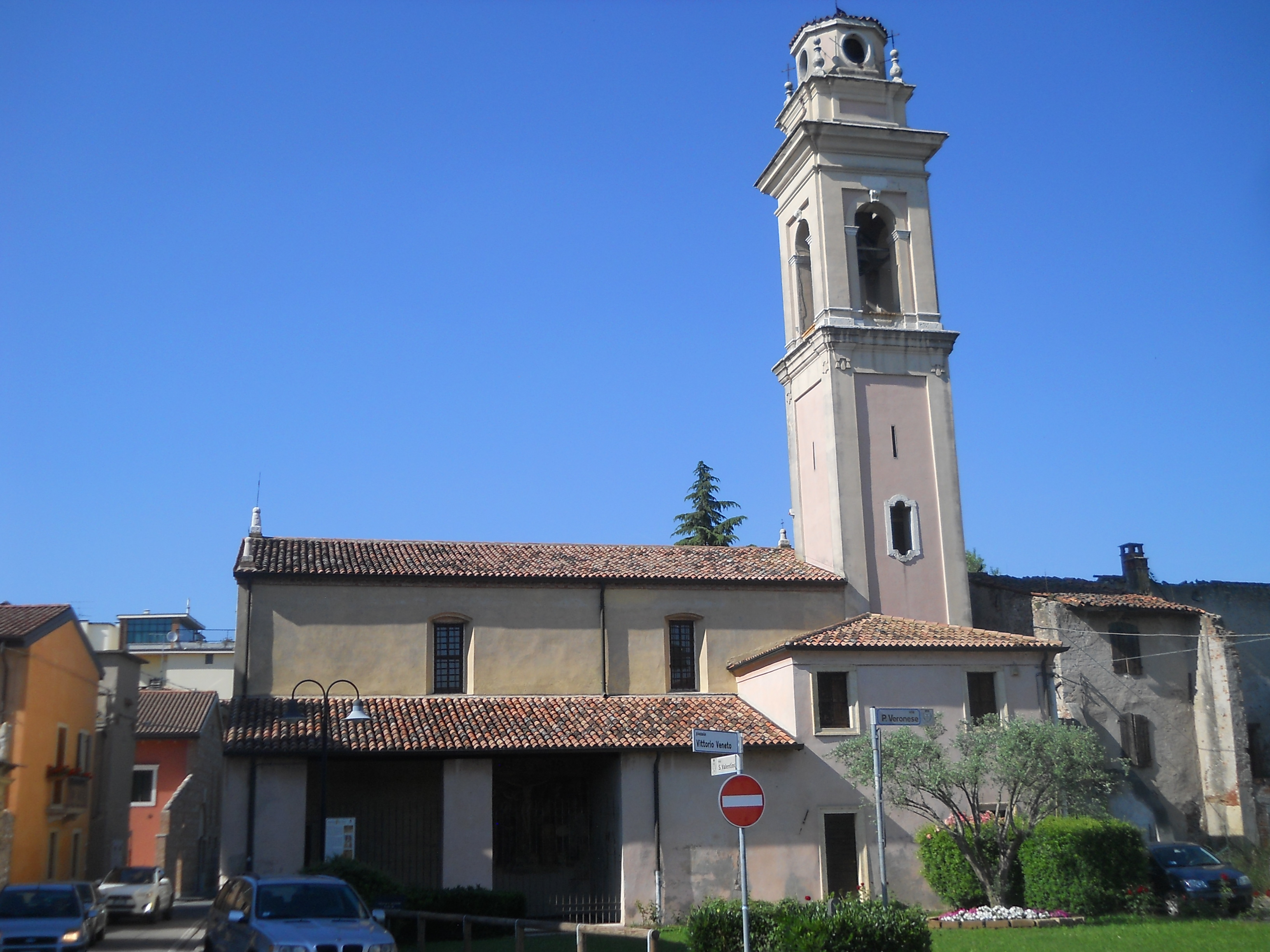
ChiesaSanValentinoBussolengo2.jpg

San Valentino is a Roman Catholic parish church, located near Piazzale Vittorio Veneto in the town of Bussolengo, province of Verona, region of Veneto, Italy.

== History ==
A church at the site was likely present by the 13th century, since documents once in the church of Santa Maria Maggiore of Bussolengo, state that in 1339, a Gilberto, bishop of Tiberiade, had reconsecrated the church after it had been sacked by soldiers fighting the Scaligeri forces. In 1391, the bishop of Verona, Giacomo de Rossi, granted the flagellant confraternity of the Disciplini the right to restore the church, and construct an adjacent hostel for travellers. By the first half of the 15th century the church had been frescoed by anonymous local painters with a cycle of frescoes narrating the Life of St Valentine. On the south portico of the church is a 14th-century fresco of the Crucifixion. By the end of the 16th century, the church had one main altar and three minor ones dedicated respectively to the Blessed Virgin, the Pietà, and St James.

In 2011, the interior and exterior underwent restoration.
