= Francesco Benaglio =

Italian painter (1432 - 1492)

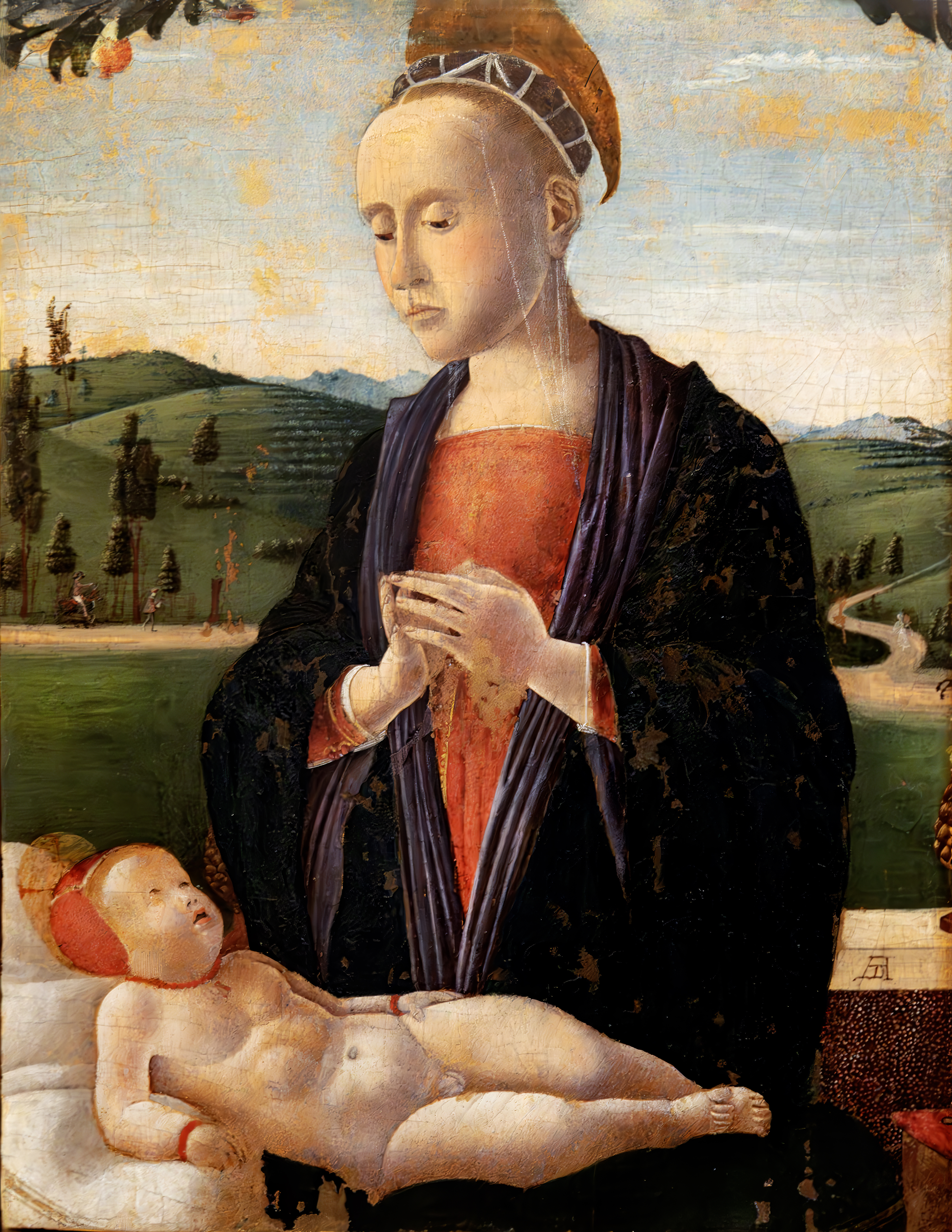
Madonna and Child Museo Correr

Francesco Benaglio (c. 1432 - 1492) was an Italian painter of the Renaissance period.

His original name was Francesco di Pietro della Biada. 'Della Biada' (or 'a Blado') means 'of the oats' and was a reference to the profession of his father Pietro who was a grain merchant from Bergamo. Francesco moved with his family to Verona, where he is documented from 1456 until his death. He adopted his artist name Francesco Benaglio from a noble family then living in Bergamo.

The artist was active in Verona. His first known work is a triptych in the church of San Bernardino in Verona (1462-1463). This was a prestigious commission and suggests he was already quite famous by that time. In 1475, Benaglio and another painter by the name of Martino were jailed for four months for painting one night some obscene or defamatory frescoes on the facade of the Sagramorso family palace, apparently at the behest of some enemies of the family.

A group of five Madonnas ascribed to the artist show an ostentatious use of perspective foreshortening together with an almost geometric rigidity in the drawing of the figures. The monumentality of the figures is further emphasized by the highly stylized landscapes in the background. His relative Girolamo Benaglio was also a painter active in the same period.

== Biography ==
Little information is available to reconstruct his life. Historian Giuseppe Gerola places his birth around 1432, based on a record from 1472 that listed him as forty years old, while acknowledging the uncertainty of this source. His father was Pietro "a Blado", of Bergamasque origin and a merchant. The exact moment the family settled in Verona is unknown; the only certain fact is that it occurred before 1456, when he appears for the first time in an estimo. Consequently, it is not possible to determine whether Francesco, already more than a teenager at that time, was born on the banks of the Adige or when the family was in Lombardy. The origin of the surname Benaglio is also uncertain: it is presumed to indicate a family relation or a form of patronage with the homonymous noble family, also from Bergamo. In his works he always signed as "Benalius", while in documents he is cited both as "Franciscus Benalius" and "Franciscus a Blado". He had a brother, Donato, also a painter, and with his wife, whose name is unknown, he had four children: Girolamo, Lodovico, Elena, and Pietro.

Precise information about his artistic training is lacking, but it is reasonably certain that he began his career during a period of crisis for Veronese art, initiated by the death of Pisanello in 1455. Benaglio's work contributed to guiding the local artistic scene toward new horizons, anticipating by a few years the full emergence of the Renaissance in the Veronese school with Liberale and Domenico Morone.

=== The Sacra Conversazione of San Bernardino ===
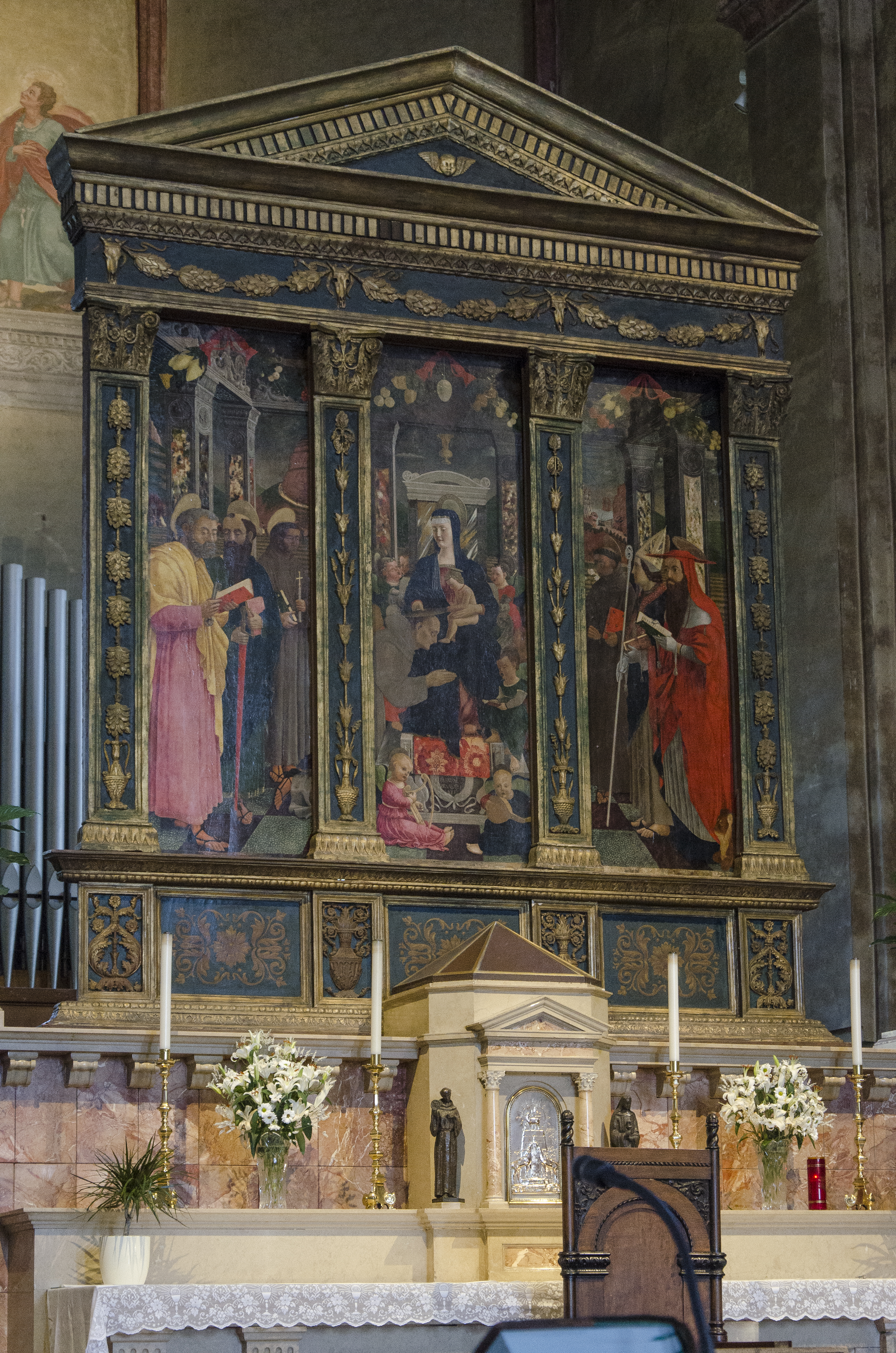
Sacra Conversazione, altarpiece of the high altar of the Church of San Bernardino, Verona

Art historians generally agree that a decisive role in the artistic shift in Verona was played by the arrival in the Basilica of San Zeno, around 1459-1460, of the San Zeno Altarpiece by Andrea Mantegna. This work exerted a profound influence on Francesco Benaglio, who drew extensively from it when, about two years later, he painted his first known work, a triptych for the high altar of the Church of San Bernardino in Verona. In this work, the Veronese painter depicted a Sacra Conversazione with the Virgin and the Child, surrounded by angels, and at their feet, Saint Bernardino of Siena flanked by the apostles Peter and Paul and the saints Francis, Jerome, Lodovico and Anthony of Padua. The comparison with Mantegna's work highlights numerous elements of derivation, from the arrangement of the figures to the decorative elements, so much so that some critics have described Benaglio's work as a «simple and crude imitation» of the famous San Zeno triptych.

Some critics have noted in the panel «a certain stiffness, excessive crowding, and somewhat coarse features», yet Antonio Avena believes it can «also be considered benevolently, though always far from the consciousness of Veronese painters». Other scholars have contested the definition of «ugly copy», emphasizing how it can be seen as a «new interpretation of a scenographic model used, even before Mantegna, by Donatello in 1450 for the high altar of the Basilica of Saint Anthony of Padua». It has been observed that Benaglio did not limit himself to a mere imitation of Mantegna's work but demonstrated the ability to integrate the latest Venetian artistic trends introduced by Gentile and Giovanni Bellini. Regardless of the qualitative judgment of the work, its contribution to overcoming the stagnant late Gothic culture that long characterized the Veronese school of painting is undeniable, opening it to the «Mantegna turn».

=== The years of greatest productivity ===
In 1475, contemporary chronicles recount a singular episode that led to Benaglio's four-month detention: instigated by some members of the nobility, the artist painted at night some obscene and horned figures on the facade of the Palazzo Sagramoso alla Pigna in Verona. The following year, he executed a fresco, no longer existing since 1738, depicting Saints Bartholomew, Zeno, Jerome and Francis, for the Church of Santa Maria della Scala, dating and signing it.

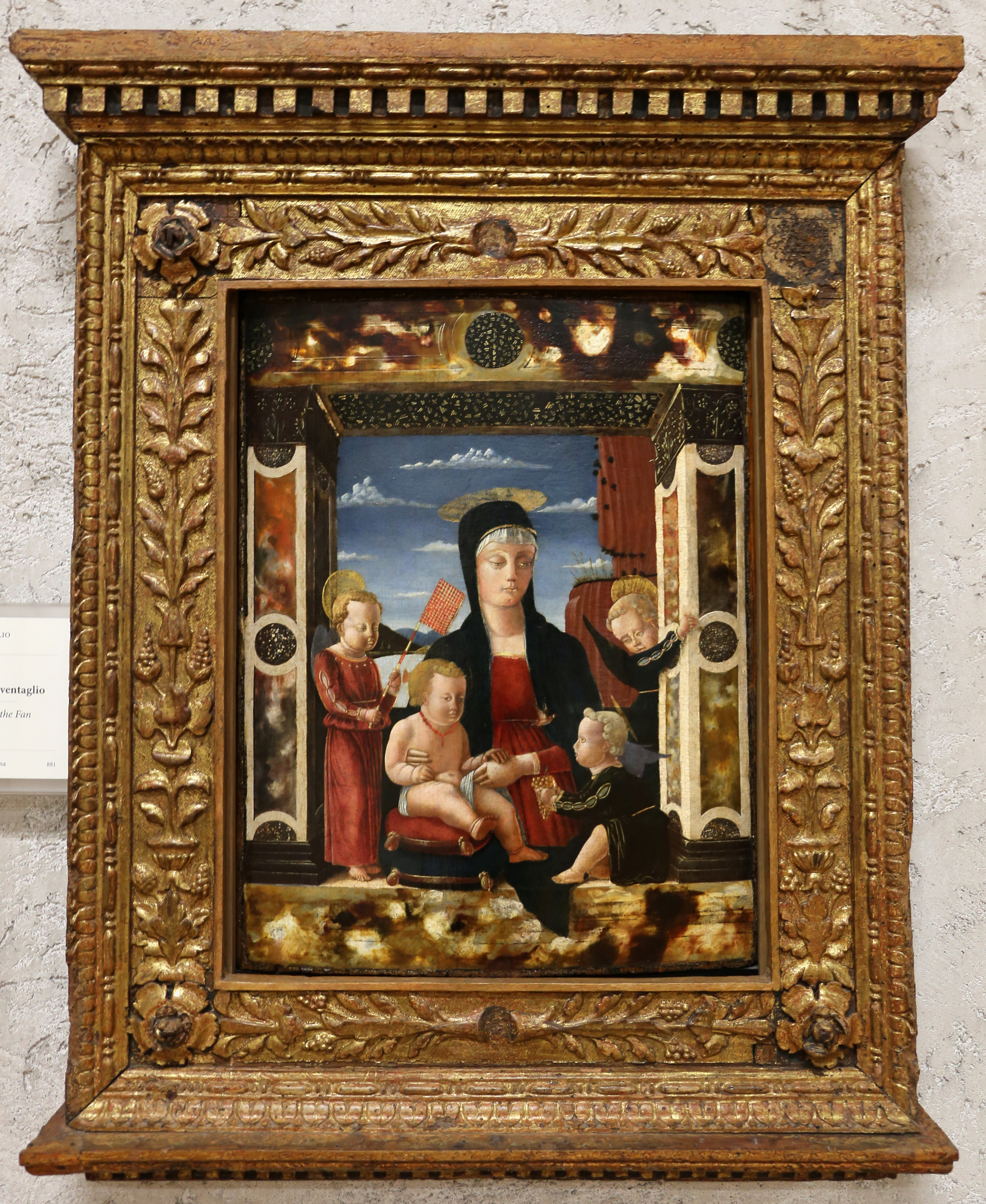
Madonna del Ventaglio, Castelvecchio Museum, Verona

From the first half of the 1470s is the execution of a Saint Jerome, now preserved at the National Gallery of Art in Washington, D.C., in which the artist signed as "Franciscus Benalius Filius Petri Ablado". In the panel, the saint (long confused with Saint Anthony, but identified by the inscription on the frieze) is placed within a «marble and suggestive Renaissance architecture». From the same period is likely also a Madonna and Child executed in tempera and oil on panel, now on display at the Memorial Art Gallery of the University of Rochester in the United States, previously part of the collections of Giuseppe Vallardi and George Chalandon. The work, undated, bore the signature "Franciscus Benalius" on a cartouche, still visible in the early 20th century but currently illegible.

The so-called Madonna del Ventaglio, preserved at the Castelvecchio Museum in Verona, is also attributed to Francesco Benaglio (although unsigned and previously attributed to other authors), considered a «small work of synthesis» in which the artist demonstrates having achieved significant autonomy from Mantegna's stylistic canons.

Influences from the works of Antonio Vivarini and Gentile Bellini are instead noticeable in the Renaissance architecture serving as background for a Saint Anthony, signed "Franciscus Benalius", now part of the Kress Collection in New York.

=== Last years and artistic legacy ===
The last documentary record relating to Francesco Benaglio dates to 1492 in an estimo; in the same year, his son Girolamo is mentioned in a register as fatherless, allowing the assumption of the artist's death in that year. It was his son who inherited the workshop of his father, although no works by his hand are known with certainty. However, numerous subsequent works show Francesco's stylistic influence, suggesting he had established a true school in which, in addition to his son Girolamo, several painters trained, probably including Domenico Morone. Despite some contrasting critical judgments, Francesco Benaglio «retains the merit of being the first in Verona to understand the importance of the pictorial renewal underway in the Paduan school by the brilliant Mantegna and of having given a jolt to the late Gothic still widespread in the Veronese school».

== Bibliography ==
- Marinelli, Sergio (1990). Lucco, Mauro (ed.). Il Quattrocento. Milano: Electa.
- Museo di Castelvecchio (2010). Marini, Paola; Napione, Ettore; Peretti, Gianni (eds.). Museo di Castelvecchio. Catalogo generale dei dipinti e delle miniature delle collezioni civiche veronesi. Dalla fine del X all'inizio del XVI secolo. Vol. 1. Cinisello Balsamo: Silvana. ISBN 978-88-8215-425-7.
- Rognini, Luciano (1974). "Domenico Morone". In Brugnoli, Pierpaolo (ed.). Maestri della pittura veronese. Verona: Banca Mutua Popolare.
- Viviani, Giuseppe Franco (2004). Chiese nel Veronese. Verona: Società cattolica di assicurazione.
