= Giuseppe Fiocco =

Italian art historian

Giuseppe Fiocco (16 November 1884 – 5 October 1971) was an Italian art historian, art critic, and academic. He is known for his research and writings on Venetian and Florentine artists.

== Biography ==
Fiocco was born on 16 November 1884 in Giacciano con Baruchella, Veneto, Italy. His parents were Luigi and Maria Carpani. In 1904 he graduated with a law degree from Sapienza University of Rome. In 1908 he obtained a literature degree from the University of Bologna, where he submitted a thesis on art history; painter and art critic Igino Benvenuto Supino served as a thesis advisor. After Bologna, Fiocco returned to Sapienza University of Rome where he undertook postgraduate art history studies under Adolfo Venturi, receiving his diploma in 1911. Under Venturi's tutelage, Fiocco became familiar with the teachings of then prominent Italian and Austrian art historians and theorists such as Giovanni Battista Cavalcaselle, Giovanni Morelli, Emanuel Löwy, and Alois Riegl.

On 7 December 1918, Fiocco married Agnese Branchi. Together they had two daughters, Luisa and Angela Maria.

During and after his studies, Fiocco traveled extensively throughout Austria, Switzerland, and Germany. Because of his travels, as early as 1909 Fiocco was familiar with impressionist works, particularly those owned by collector Marcell Nemes in Munich. He also met art historians and critics Hugo von Tschudi and Julius Meier-Graefe in Munich. In 1918 he won the competition for an internship at the superintendency of the Gallerie dell'Accademia in Venice, where he stayed until 1925, when he was transferred to the superintendency of the Galleria dell'Accademia in Florence. In 1926 he became Chair of Art History at the University of Pisa, but moved to the University of Florence later that year. In 1929 the Faculty of Literature at the University of Padua hired him to establish a Chair of Art History there; he taught at Padua until the 1955–1956 school year.

With the rise of Fascism in Italy, Fiocco tried to remain in the new authorities' good graces. However, he was known for his "proverbial salacious and polemical character," and was arrested in 1944 on suspicion of having spoken out against the Italian Social Republic.

In 1947 the steering committee of the magazine Arte Veneta chose Fiocco as its chair. Subsequently, he was accepted into the Accademia dei Lincei, the Accademia di San Luca, and numerous other Italian academies. In 1954 Fiocco was appointed as the first director of the Institute of Art History of the Giorgio Cini Foundation in Venice, serving in that position until his death. Under his leadership the institute became a major center for research into Venetian art by publishing catalogues of the collections of the Fondazione Querini Stampalia and the civic or city museums of Belluno, Treviso, and Vicenza; funding scholarships and exhibitions; and establishing a library and photo library at its headquarters on San Giorgio Maggiore. Fiocco's own research and writings focus on Venetian and Florentine art, artists, and patrons, with a special interest in Luigi Cornaro, Andrea Mantegna, Palla Strozzi, and Paolo Veronese. As a result of his work, he rediscovered the artists Francesco Vecellio, Pietro Marescalchi, and Il Pordenone, among others.

Fiocco died on 5 October 1971 at his home in Padua.

== Published works ==
This list of Fiocco's published works is not yet exhaustive.

- Giovanni Giocondo Veronese, Verona, G. Franchini, 1916.
- Francesco Guardi, second edition, Florence, L. Battistelli, 1923.
- L'arte di Andrea Mantegna, Bologna, Apollo, 1927.
- Paolo Veronese 1528-1588, Bologna, Casa Editrice Apollo, 1928.
- La pittura veneziana del Seicento e Settecento, Verona, Apollo, 1929.
- Carpaccio, Roma, Casa edit. d'arte Valori Plastici, 1930.
- Appunti delle lezioni di storia dell'arte medievale-moderna, Padua, Gruppo universitario fascista, 1936.
- Giorgione, Bergamo, Istituto Italiano d'Arti Grafiche, 1941.
- La pittura toscana del Quattrocento, Novara, De Agostini, 1941.
- Giovanni Antonio Pordenone, second edition, Padova, Le Tre Venezie, 1943.
- Giambattista Crosato, second edition, Padua, Le Tre Venezie, 1944.
- Francesco Guardi : l'Angelo Raffaele, Turin, Edizioni Radio Italiana, 1958.
