= Churches of Verona =

Churches of Verona, Italy

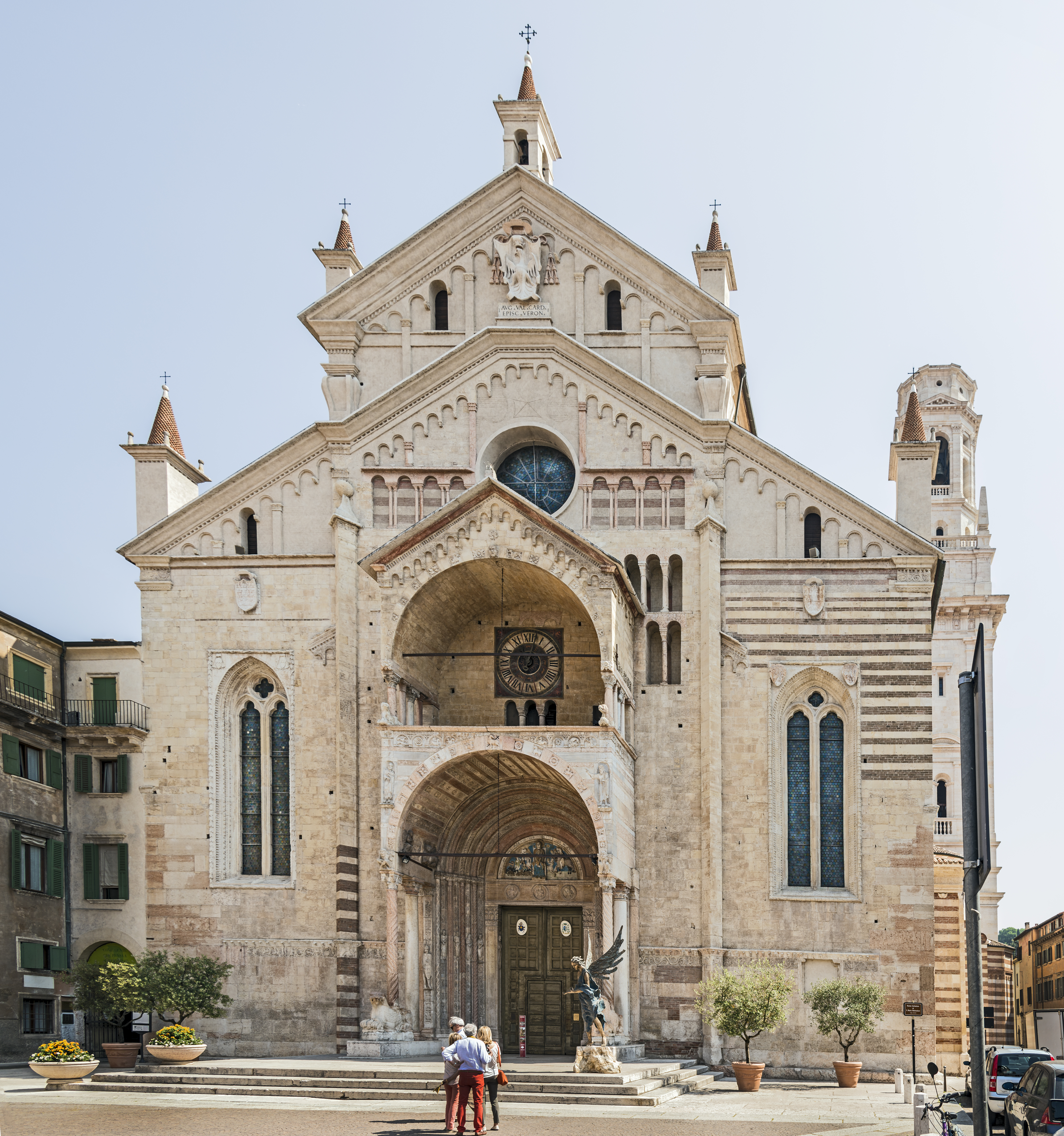
The cathedral of Verona, cathedral church of the diocese of Verona

The churches of Verona are the places of Catholic worship that have been built within the administrative boundaries of the municipality of Verona, evidence of the ups and downs that the city has experienced throughout its history.

== History ==
=== From the origins to the earthquake of 1117 ===
Of the many buildings that were erected at the dawn of Christianity in Verona, not many vestiges remain; among the first is the early Christian basilica that was built in the fourth century at the present-day Verona cathedral complex, whose archaeological remains still survive and can be admired inside the church of St. Helena, particularly the notable mosaic floors. Other archaeological evidence includes the traces found during some excavations that uncovered a concentric apse in the foundations of the Church of the Holy Apostles.

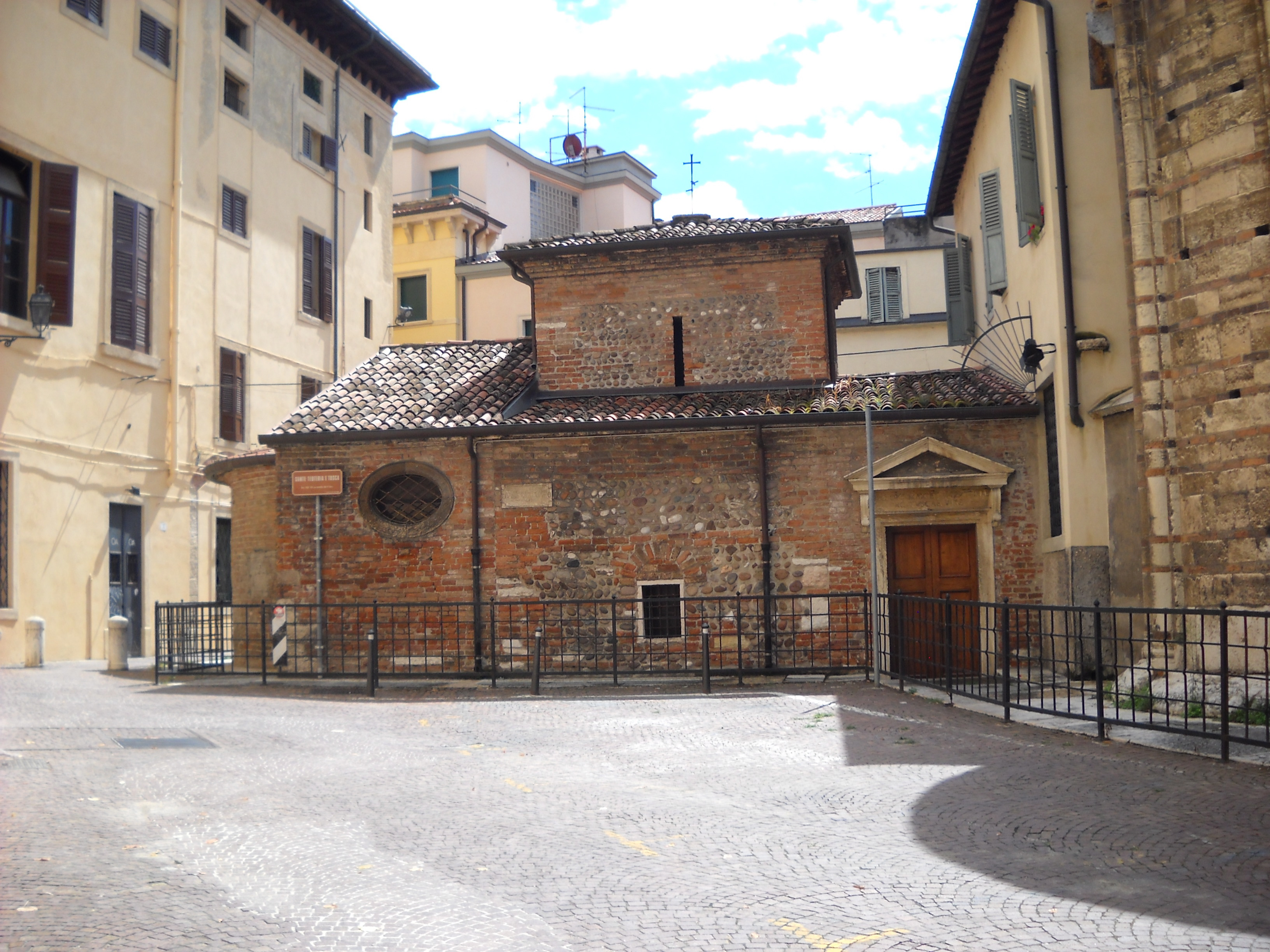
The small sacellum of Saints Teuteria and Tosca, martyrium of the 5th century

The oldest building that has come down to us almost intact, on the other hand, is the sacellum of Saints Teuteria and Tosca, adjacent to the apse of the church just mentioned, much of the 5th-century masonry of which has survived: it is a typical Greek-cross building with a small dome covering the cross, a type of building that in the early Christian age was intended to contain the tomb of some important person or, as in this case, of a saint. However, the building has undergone some transformations over time that do not allow it to be admired in its original appearance, particularly because of the addition of some spaces in the 14th century, when it became the funerary chapel of the Bevilacqua family and assumed a square floor plan; nevertheless, the church still retains its early Christian essence.

Also to the same century belong vast portions of the walls of the church of St. Stephen, which underwent, however, some transformations in the early medieval and Romanesque periods; this building, built extra moenia and included in the walls of Verona only later, is particularly important for the history of the Veronese Church, as it was almost certainly an episcopal seat from the end of the fifth century until the bishopric of Annone in the eighth century. It was probably a building preceded by a quadriporticus and with a single-aisle plan ending in an apse; definitely unusual for the single-aisle layout, since most early Christian churches were characterized by three naves, although it finds several examples in other contemporary religious buildings in Lombardy and central Europe.

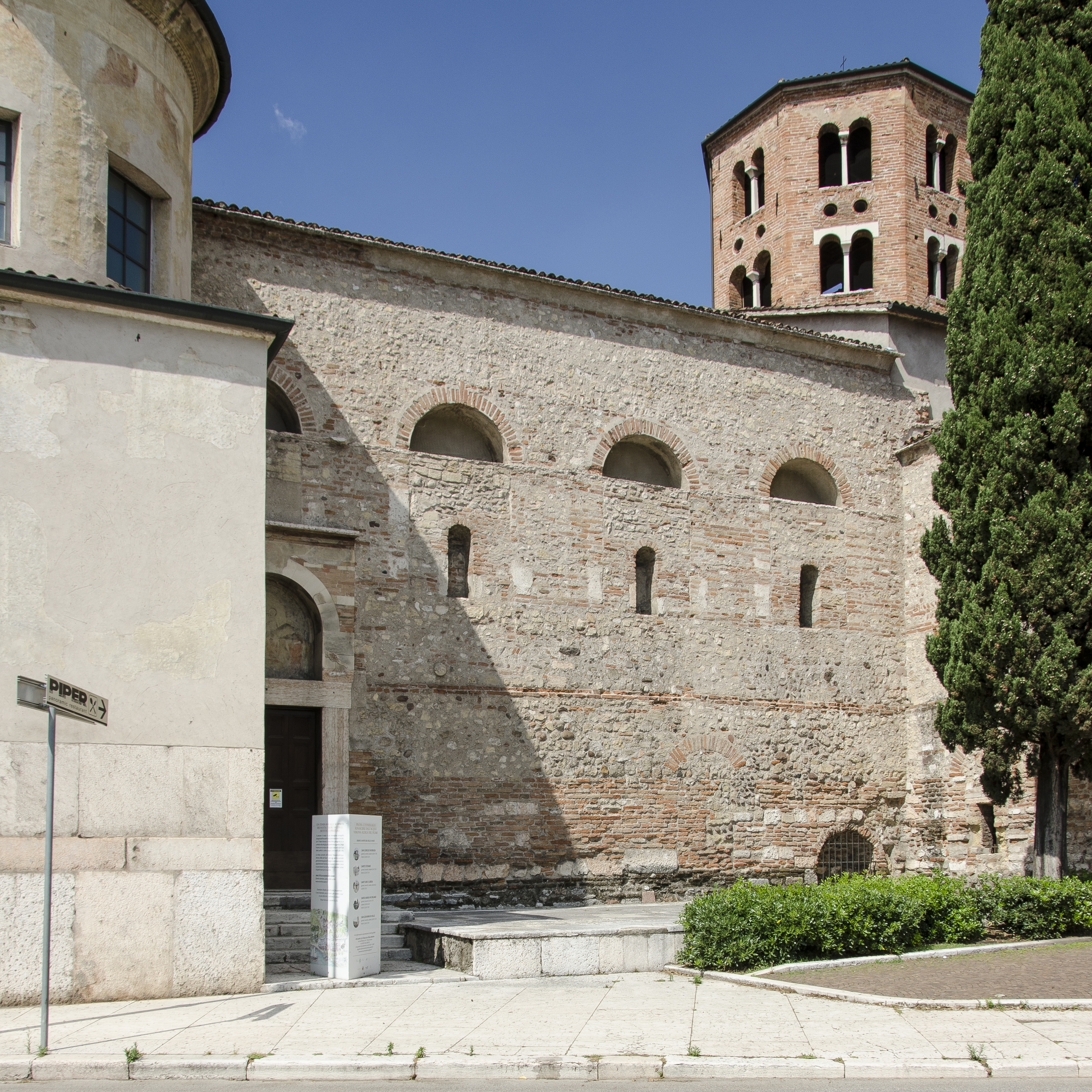
The southern wall of St. Stephen's Church, dating back to the 5th century

Numerous churches and monasteries were built in Lombard and Frankish times, buildings mostly known from two important records from that period: the Versus de Verona, a composition in rhythmic prose datable to the reign of Pepin, and the Raterian Iconography, a map that Bishop Ratherius had made around the middle of the 10th century. These important written documents give an insight into which churches were already in existence at that time among which are especially mentioned the church of Santa Maria Matricolare, the baptistery of San Giovanni in Fonte, the church of Sant'Elena and the church of Santa Maria Antica in the oldest center, then the church of San Giovanni in Valle across the Adige River and the Benedictine monastery of San Fermo in its vicinity. Within the walls the documents also mention the presence of the monasteries of St. Euphemia and the church of St. Lawrence, while outside the walls the monasteries of Saints Nazaro and Celso and St. Mary in Organo, the latter under the jurisdiction of the patriarch of Aquileia. All these buildings, some of which were severely damaged by the Hungarian invasion of 932, underwent rather significant transformations in the following centuries, so that few material remains have survived untouched until today.

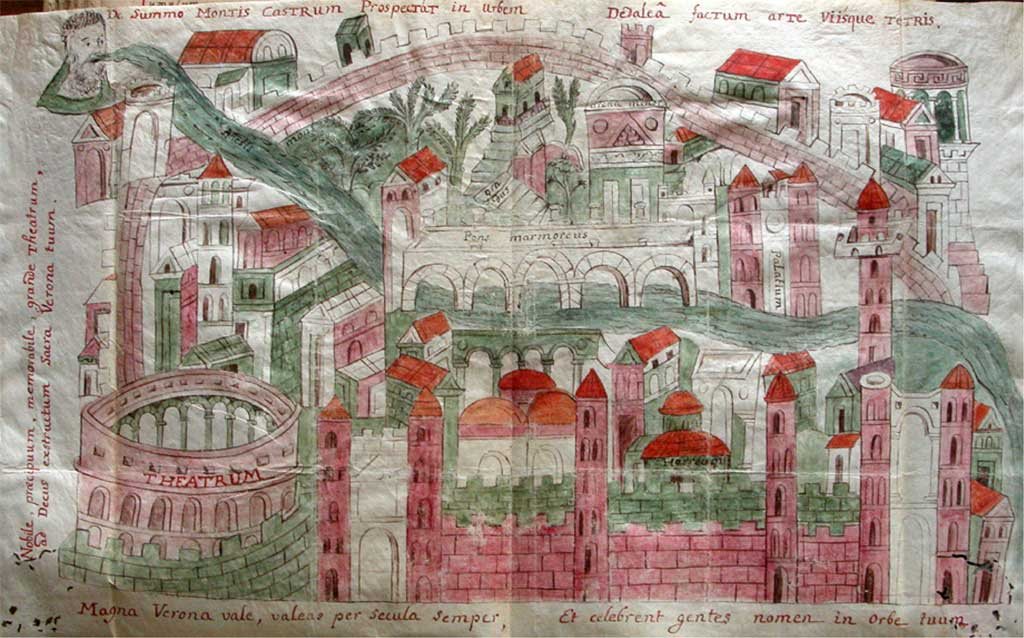
The Raterian Iconography, the oldest known depiction of the city of Verona

In the Versus de Verona, moreover, there was the first attempt to describe Verona as a small Jerusalem; with the intention of making the image of the city as close as possible to the ideal of purity of the heavenly Jerusalem, the text attempted to redeem the pagan foundation of Verona by turning great attention to the sacred history of the town. This parallelism between the two cities was also celebrated several centuries later in the preface to the Statutes of the Municipality of Verona, written in 1450 by Silvestro Lando, a learned humanist, and in the city seal itself approved on February 26, 1474, where the inscription "Verona minor Hierusalem di(vo) Zenoni patrono" appeared. Going back to the early Middle Ages, it was mainly the image of the city that dictated the terms of comparison with Jerusalem, and during the Carolingian Renaissance it was particularly the archdeacon Pacificus who gave impetus to the architectural renewal; it was therefore at that time that it was given the name minor Hierusalem, finding several similarities between the ancient forms of Verona and Jerusalem. In Jerusalem, the Cedron stream flowing outside the walls separates the hills of Calvary from Mount Olivet. Similarly, in Verona, the Adige separates Mount Olivet, where the church of the Holy Trinity stands, from the barren Mount Cavro, where the church of San Rocchetto stands. It was formerly known as the Church of the Holy Sepulchre and where three crosses stood.

A turning point was the catastrophic earthquake of Verona in 1117, which caused extensive damage to most of the monuments, causing the substantial disappearance from the city of most of the early medieval testimonies; this fact, in turn, left room for a wide diffusion of the Romanesque style, used in the reconstruction of the affected churches. This event was so crucial for the city that the economic and social crisis that seized it immediately after the earthquake offered a new citizen class the opportunity to seize power, establish an autonomous form of local government, and establish in Verona one of the first free Italian communes.

=== Post-earthquake reconstruction: the Veronese Romanesque style ===
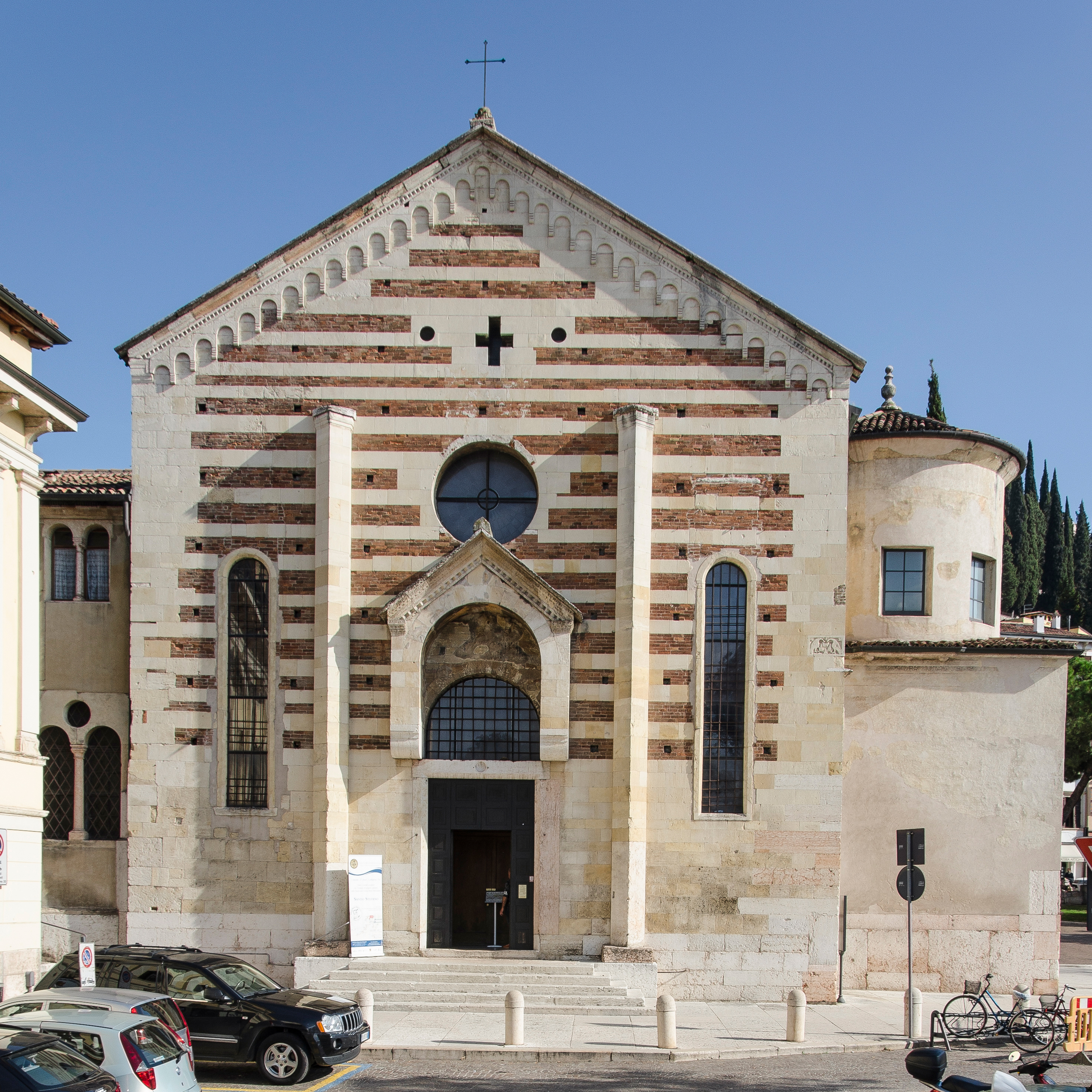
The façade of the church of Santo Stefano features several elements typical of Veronese Romanesque architecture, such as the alternation of tuff and brick courses, the use of buttresses and eave cornices

The 12th century was thus a flourishing period for Veronese architecture; both the high number of church buildings and their peculiarities make Verona's Romanesque architecture among the most notable despite being less well known than Lombard-Emilian Romanesque architecture, probably because Veronese Romanesque, with the sole exception of the exuberant basilica of San Zeno, presents discrete and austere building complexes, absent of sculptural decoration. The Veronese style, in fact, is only partly related to that of Emilia while it finds some elements of Venetian influence: in particular from the lagoon, similarities can be found in the adoption of the basilica plan layout, the near absence of vaults and the use, instead, of wide timber roof trusses; the types of plans, however, also find some parallels in the Cluniac architecture of northern France.

Other features found in Veronese Romanesque include the marked verticality given by the external use of lesenes and half-columns (often with Corinthian-order capitals, thus repetitions of classical decorative elements that were easy to find in the city) leaning against the masonry in addition to the lack, in most cases, of horizontal architectural or decorative elements, except for the carved tuff cornices crowning the elevations. Then there is the construction technique of the walls, which becomes for a long period of time a constant, that is, the use in the masonry of courses in tuff ashlars alternating with courses in brickwork, which among other things create vivid color effects.

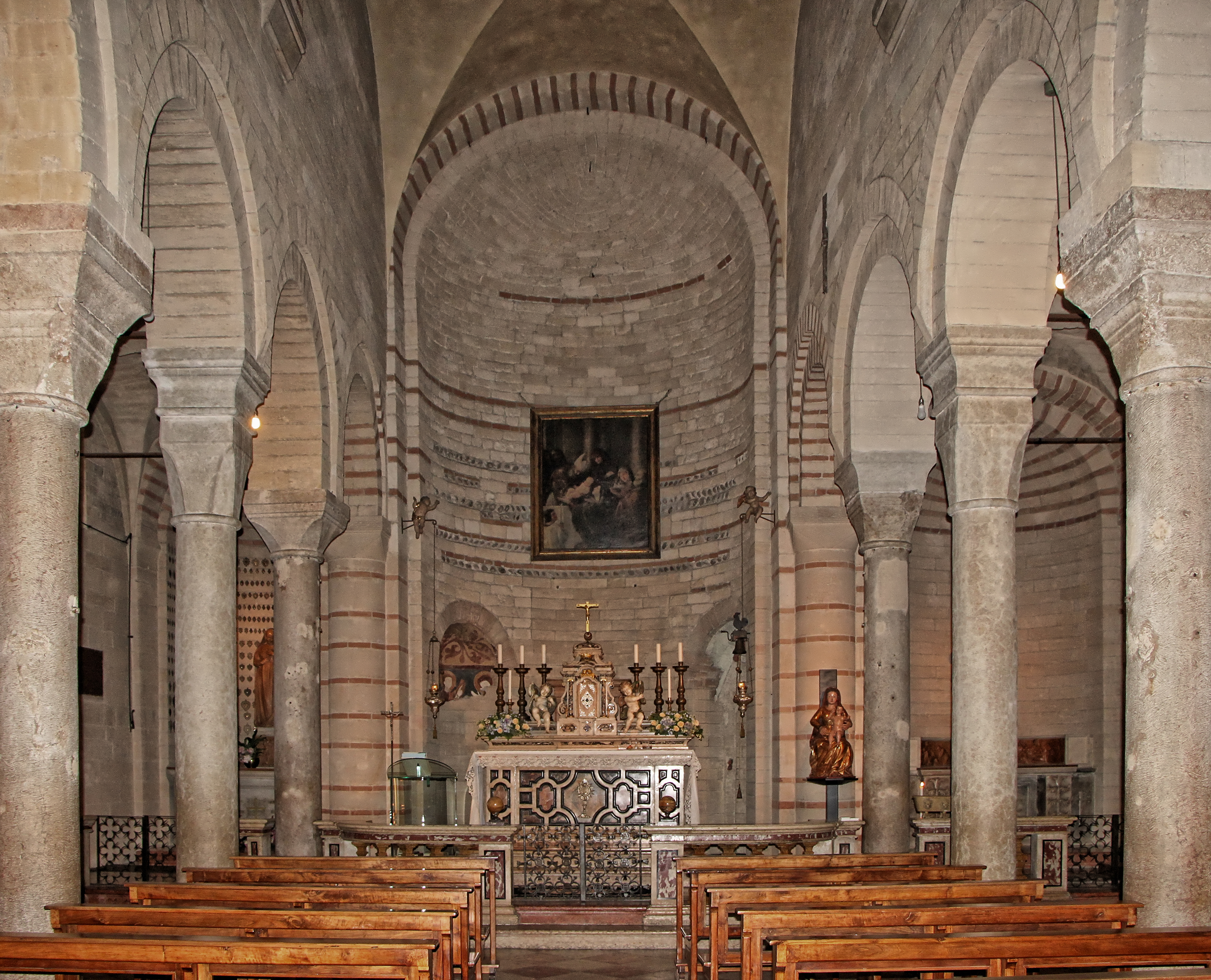
The interior of the church of Santa Maria Antica

Among the most striking examples of this flourishing religious architecture is the church of Santa Maria Antica, famous above all because the princes of Verona, the Della Scala family, built next to it, which became their personal chapel, a small masterpiece of Gothic architecture, the so-called Scaliger tombs. The interior of the church building is characterized by three naves separated by two rows of columns with capitals in the shape of an inverted pyramid, with the aisles covered by rib vaults and the nave originally covered by wooden trusses.

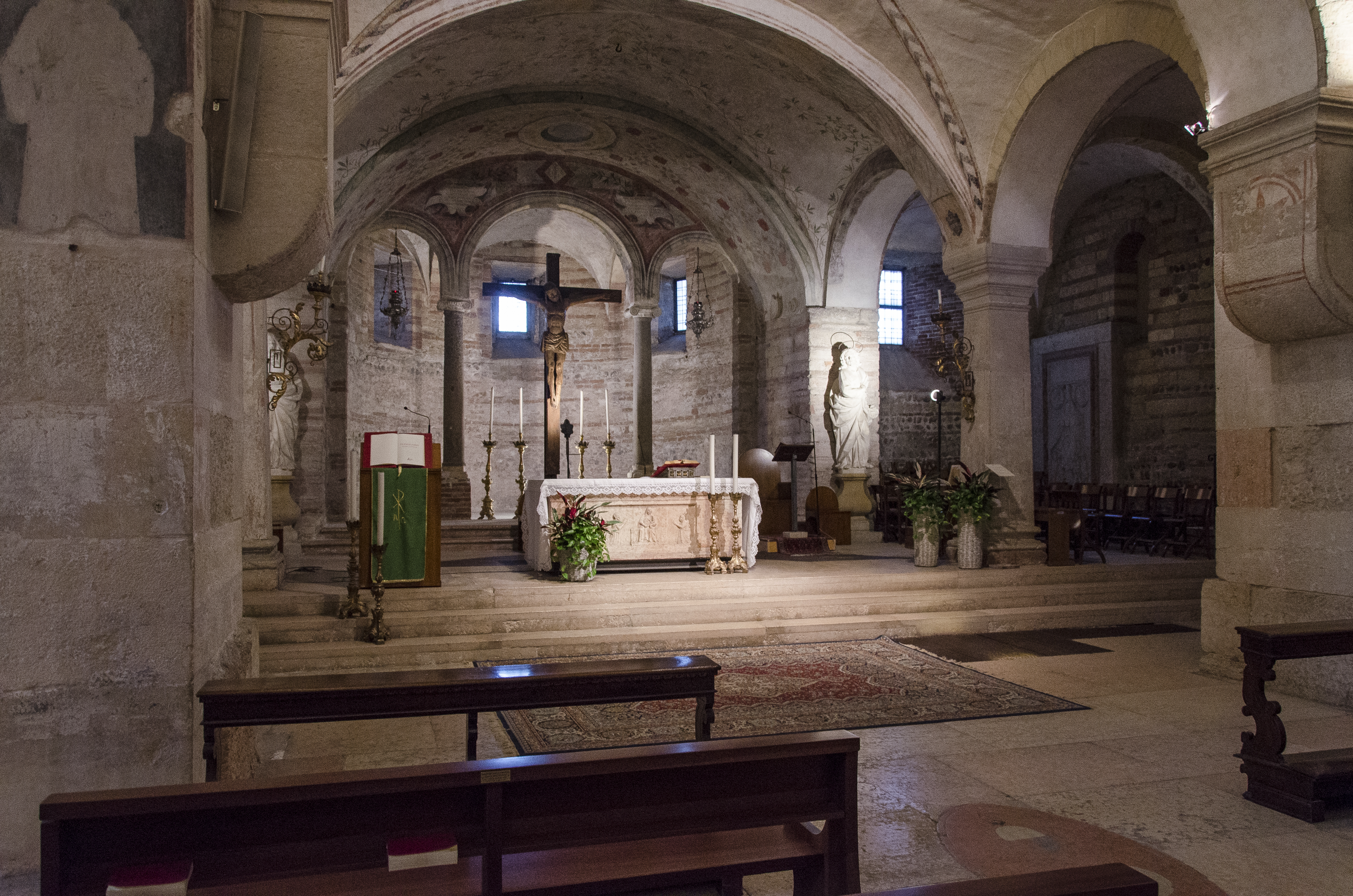
The crypt of the church of San Fermo Maggiore, also known as the "lower church"

Among the oldest Romanesque buildings is the church of San Fermo Maggiore, whose construction began before the earthquake and ended in the 12th century. The peculiar building provided from the beginning for the superimposition of two churches identical in plan; while the upper church was rebuilt in the Gothic style, the lower one presents substantially intact the original appearance, with the aisles separated from the central one by an alternation of square pillars and cruciform pillars (although the nave, for technical reasons, was divided longitudinally by a series of slender pillars), and a short transept with apses oriented in the same direction as the three major apses, placed at the aisles. Finally, the space is covered by a dense cross-vaulted roof.

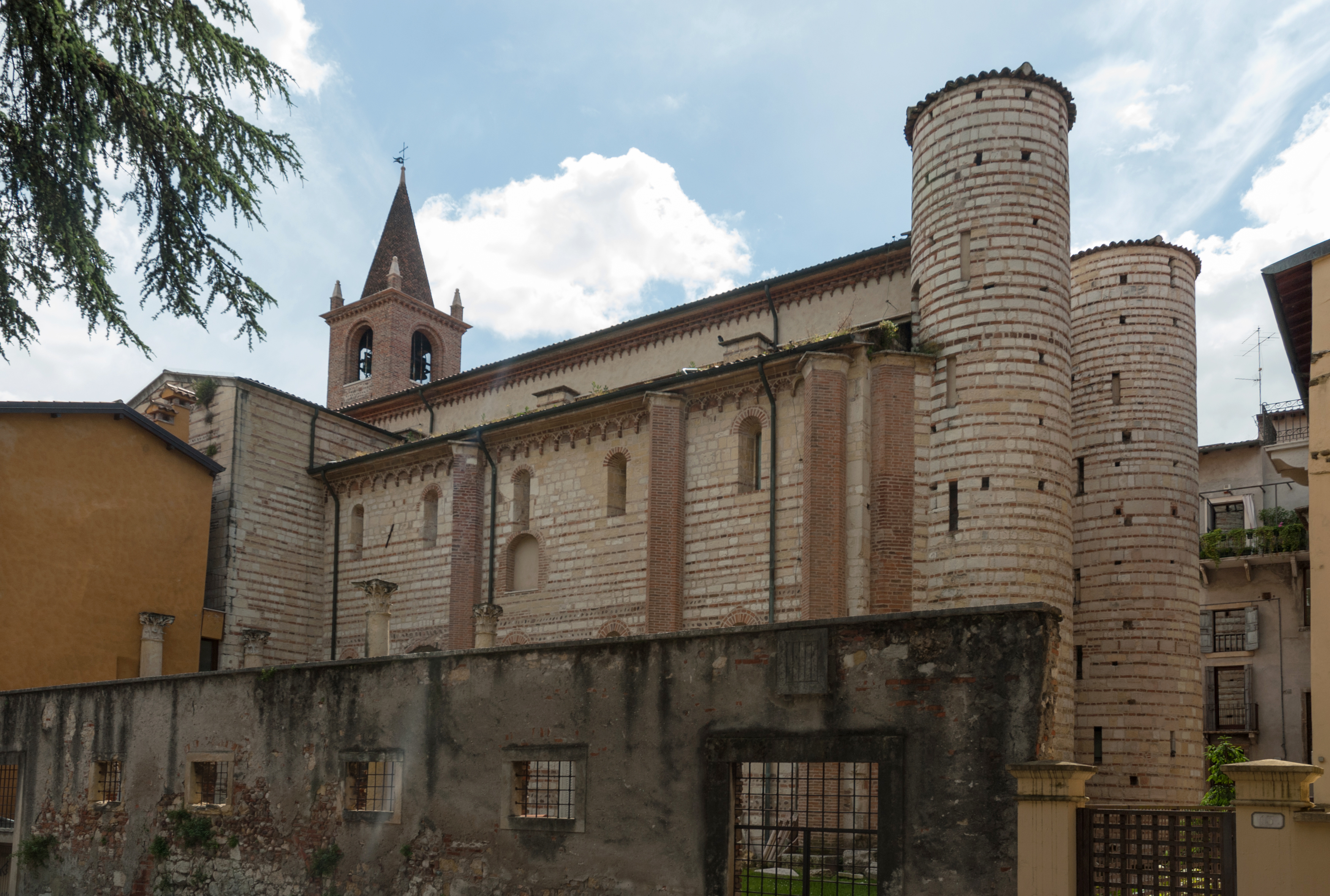
The church of San Lorenzo with the two scalar towers on the facade

Significant for the development of the communal city were two complexes that were built on the flanks of the ancient Via Postumia, a road that extended from Porta Borsari into the countryside: the church of San Lorenzo and the previously mentioned church of Santi Apostoli. The former presents a plan similar to that of the lower church of San Fermo, with the transept whose short arms are articulated in two bays and equipped with oriented apses. The building has a stern and compact exterior, punctuated by massive buttresses and two tall cylindrical scalar towers that enclose the gabled facade; the two towers are a new element in Po Valley architecture and refer rather to the Nordic tradition. The interior is also extremely peculiar due to the presence, a unicum for Po Valley architecture, of a matroneum that also runs along the counterfacade and not only at the side aisles. The latter are separated from the nave by arches imposed on cruciform pillars alternating with columns and are covered by a row of rib vaults, while the nave is covered by wooden trusses.

The Church of the Holy Apostles has a plan typical of Norman and Burgundian architecture, with three naves ending in three apses, the central one of which is very deep and the side ones carved into the thickness of the wall. The monocuspidal facade is punctuated by four buttresses similar to those of San Lorenzo, though the church was elevated and the naves reduced to one during the transformations that the building underwent in the 16th century; traces of Romanesque construction are nevertheless evident on the exterior, as the elevated part has been plastered while the Romanesque part is characterized by the typical Romanesque Veronese face, with alternating courses of brick and tuff.

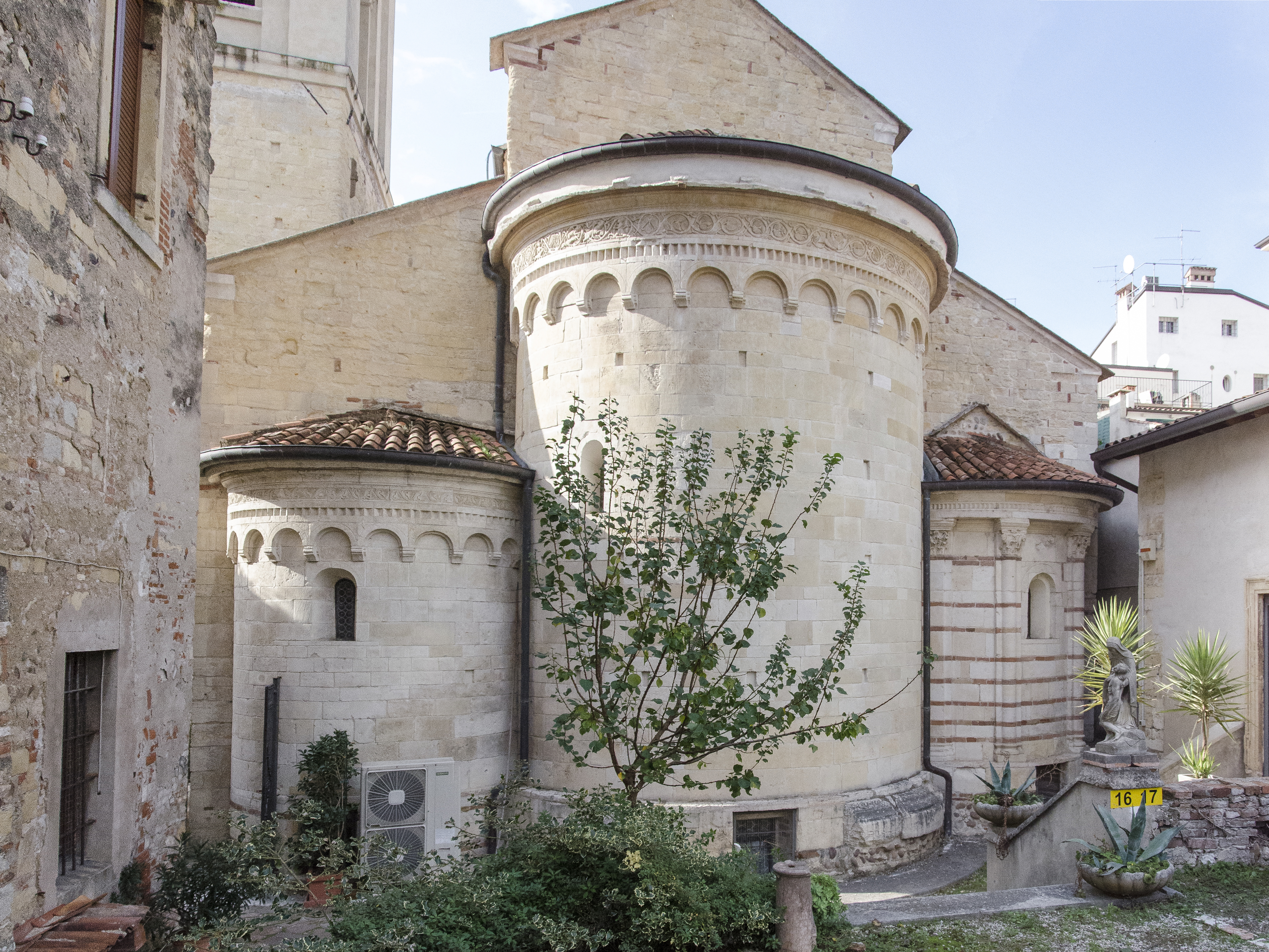
The back of the church of San Giovanni in Valle, with the projecting apses crowned with classical friezes and with the one on the right having lesenes with Corinthian capitals

Moving on to the other side of the Adige River, in the Veronetta district, is the church of San Giovanni in Valle, built from 1120 on the remains of an 8th-century building: this is one of the most valuable works of late Veronese Romanesque, where one can see the now achieved balance between plan and elevation, the use of the basilical plan with three naves separated by columns alternating with pillars, but with the renunciation, on the outside, of the chromatic alternation derived from the use of brick and tuff. In this case the external decoration is entrusted to the use of regular tuff ashlars and the classical frieze that crowns some elevations. The greater classical sensibility can be seen in particular in the amplitude of the emerging masses of the apses (of which the northern one has lesenes crowned by finely sculpted Corinthian capitals), and is repeated in the size of the bell tower, connected to the building by means of a large semicircular arch reminiscent of the Roman Ponte Pietra, and in the rhythm of the small arches of the cloister, of which, however, only one arm has survived. The interior of the church possesses a linearity, given by the three simple naves covered by wooden trusses, interrupted only by the raised chancel, under which the crypt finds its place, while the dim natural lighting from narrow monoforas openings over the nave recreates the original and evocative atmosphere.

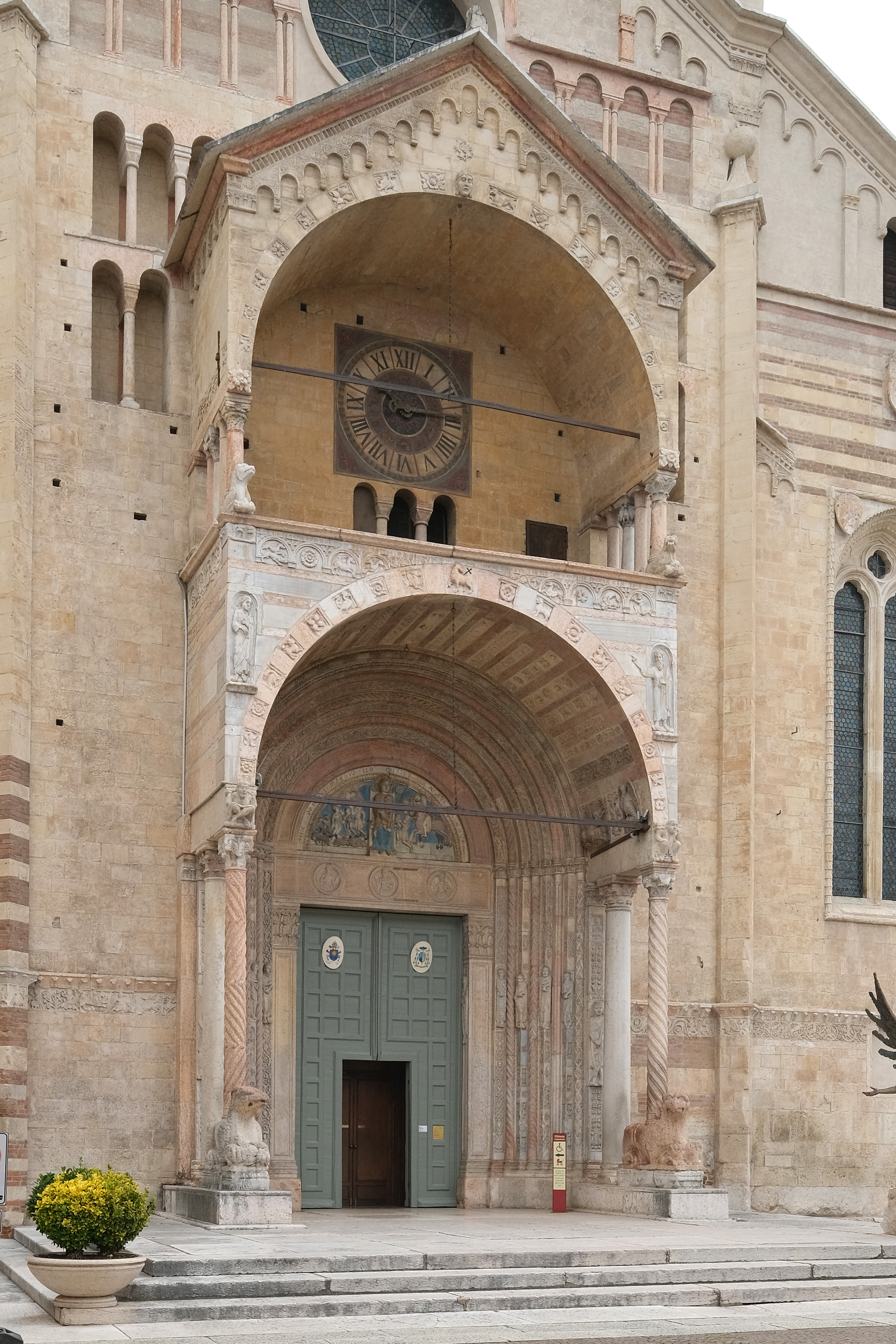
The portal of the cathedral, the 1139 work of Niccolò

A complex of great interest is that of the Cathedral, consisting not only of the mother church of the diocese of Verona, but also of the Cloister of the Canons, the baptistery of San Giovanni in Fonte, and the Church of Sant'Elena, the latter built over structures from Roman times. This complex became from the communal age a religious center with autonomous development with respect to the civil one, even from the urban point of view, so much so that it saw the layering of numerous structures over the centuries. The cathedral underwent several transformations over time, yet on the outside it still retains several aspects of the Romanesque church, especially in the lower part of the facade (raised in the 15th century), along the southern flank and in the apse area. The double prothyrum portal, the work of the sculptor Niccolò, who perhaps also participated in the design of the building, is very valuable; the geometrically simple apsidal area is imposing, with the choir standing out against the scenery created by the interplay of nave and side aisles, and a slender verticalism propelled by the lack of horizontal elements and the presence of slender lesenes with Corinthian capitals, decorated with animal heads.

Two other churches rebuilt in the same years are part of the complex: St. John's baptistery, consisting of a small church with three apsidal naves separated by arches on columns alternating with pilasters and covered by wooden trusses, at the center of which is the monumental octagonal baptismal font, a work attributed to Brioloto de Balneo and his workshop; and then the small church of St. Helena, with a single hall covered by trusses and illuminated by narrow monoforas, whose construction system echoes the alternation of bands of tuff ashlars and courses of bricks.

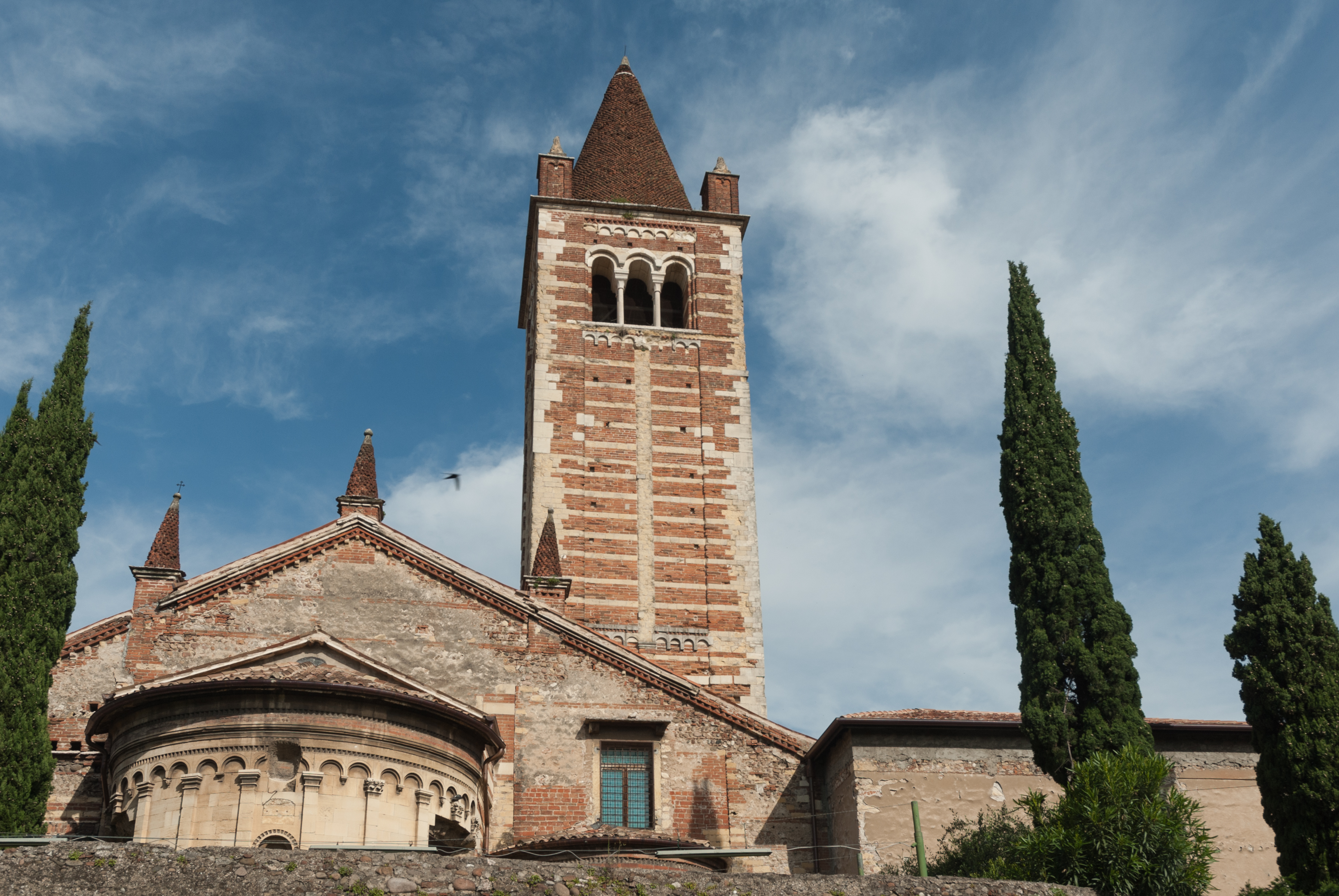
The bell tower and apse of the Holy Trinity Church in Monte Oliveto

In an isolated position (when it was built), on the other hand, is the church of the Holy Trinity in Monte Oliveto, a picturesque corner of the city set on a small rise that gives its name to the building, which was commissioned by the Vallombrosian congregation. The plan is rather simple although the major apse is flanked by two apsidal side chapels that go to form a pseudo-transept, while the façade is preceded by a covered atrium but opened along two sides by a series of small arches set on coupled columns. The most characteristic part, however, is the belfry, with the typical bichromatic face of Veronese Romanesque architecture and a division into three orders by three rows of Lombard bands in tuff, and a slender pilaster running along the entire shaft; on the belfry cell, surmounted by a conical roof, there are three triforas with paired columns supporting the double archivolt arches.

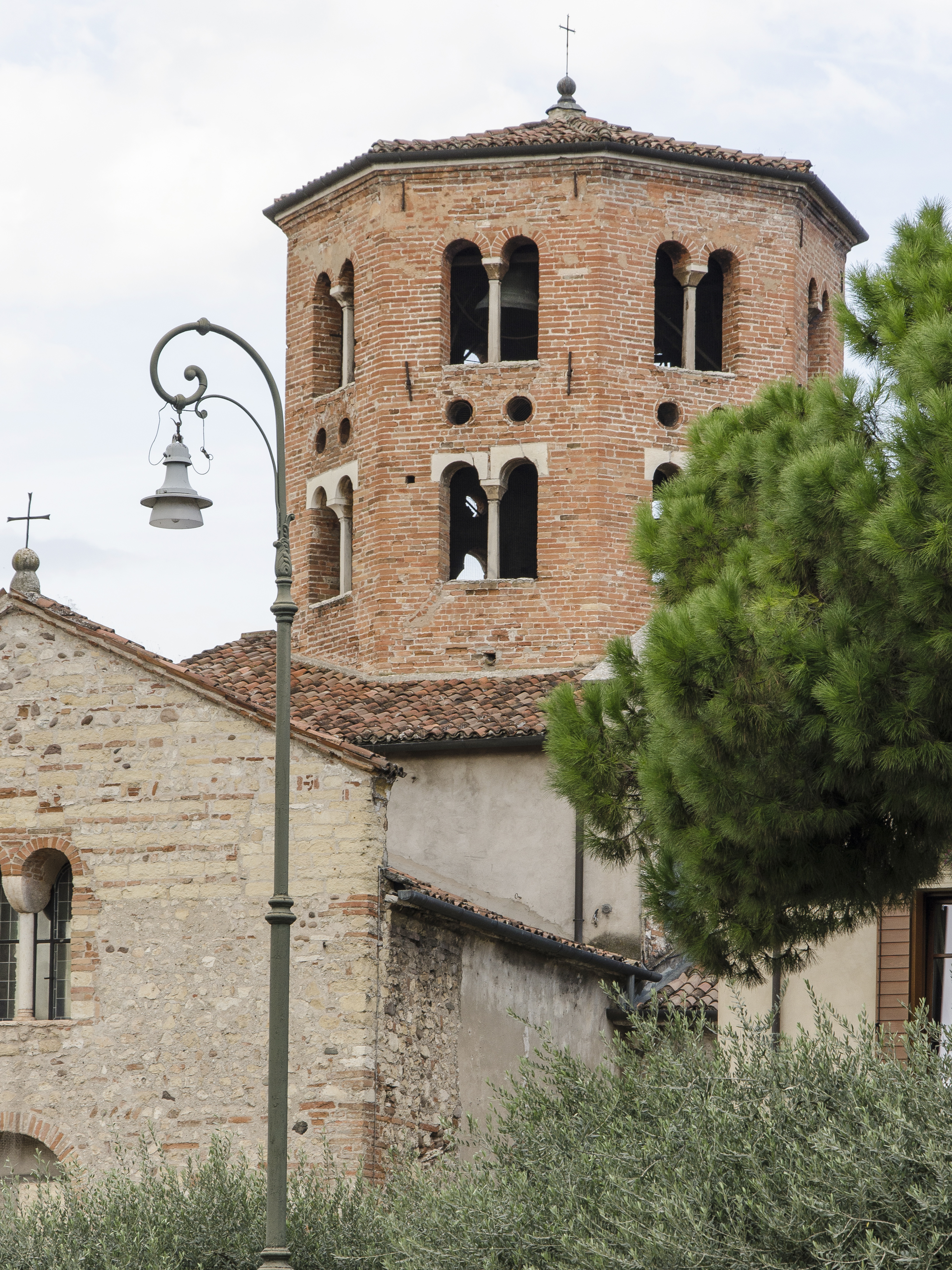
The tiburium, reminiscent of those in Lombard Romanesque style, of St. Stephen's Church

Returning across the Adige River and to the aforementioned church of Santo Stefano, its enlargement and repairs in the Romanesque period led to the construction of a new façade where all the stylistic features of Veronese Romanesque can be seen, while a unicum in the Verona panorama is the octagonal tiburium, which is grafted onto the transept cross with the nave, incorporates a small dome and is distinguished by the presence of two orders of biforas; it recalls a type of element found especially in the Lombard area.

The highest example of Veronese Romanesque, however, is represented by the basilica of San Zeno, a building that adequately closes the chapter on this era, a mature expression anticipating some Gothic motifs, whose delicate lexicon refers to the contemporary Emilian style rather than to the austere one that had marked architecture in the city up to that time. It was built throughout the 12th century, although its origins are earlier and hark back to the presence of the abbey of San Zeno, which was so influential that it caused the emergence of the village of the same name outside Verona's Roman and communal walls.

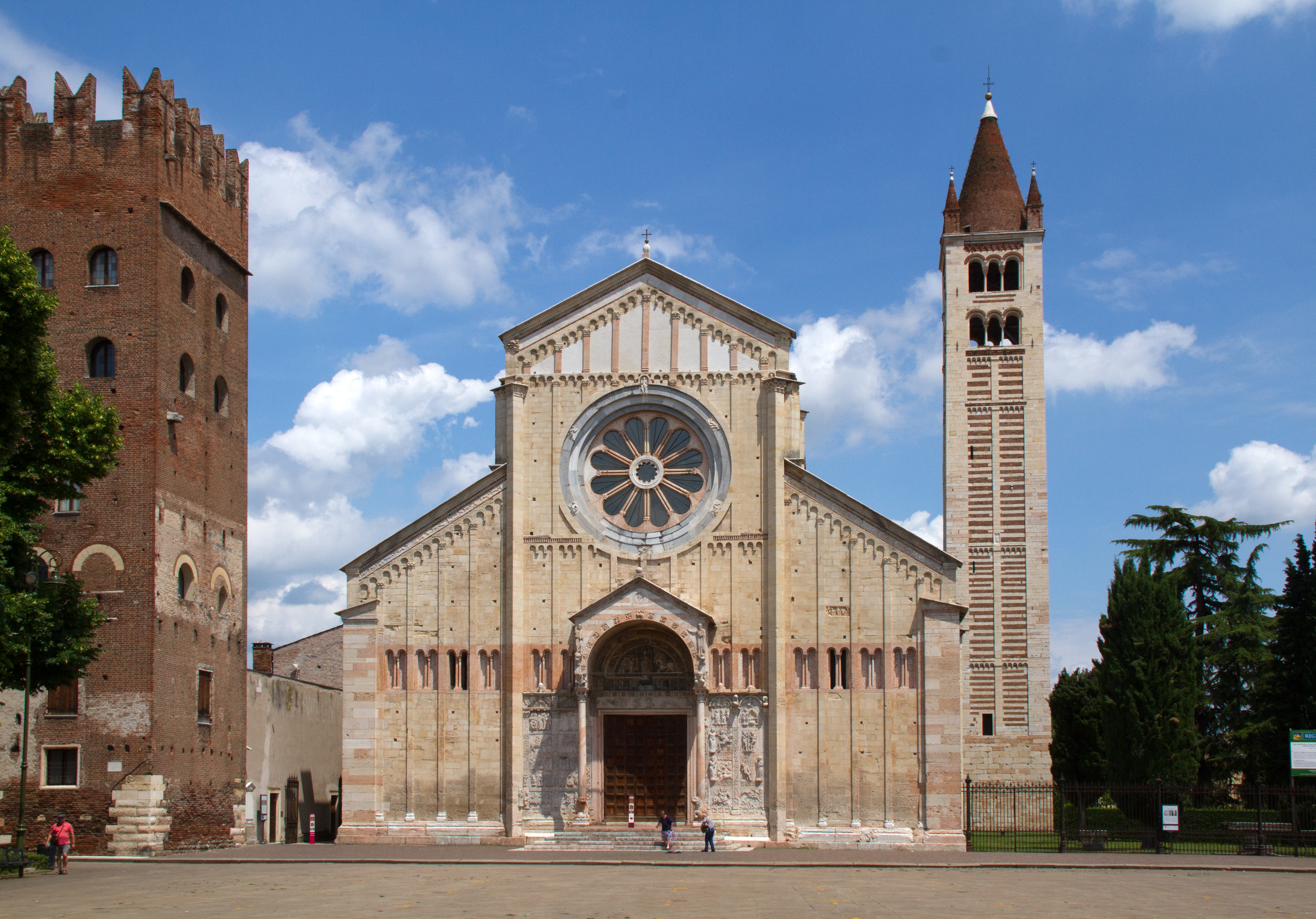
The façade of the basilica of San Zeno, the highest expression of mature Romanesque in Verona, clearly derived from Emilia

The importance of the abbey's main building, which faces Piazza San Zeno, enclosed on the left by the abbey tower and on the right by the Romanesque church of San Procolo, can be sensed by admiring the long southern front with its slopes covering the aisles of the church. To the earliest period of the building site dates the imposing bell tower that stands out to the south of San Zeno, built in alternate rows of tuff and brick, subdivided into orders by hanging arches and crowned by a double order of triforas, thus re-proposing the typology of that of the Holy Trinity but in quite different proportions. The salient facade is the most famous element, partly due to the presence of the famous bronze portal; it was built when the building was extended in the 13th century, constructed with the use of tuff and marble that create a more elegant color scheme than the more lively early Romanesque one in the city. It is interrupted by a band of biforas running the length of it, punctuated by a series of pilasters, while in the center opens the Wheel of Fortune, that is, the rose window by master Brioloto de Balneo. Finally, the interior, divided into three naves by arches set on massive columns and cruciform pillars, has a vastness that finds no reference in the city's other Romanesque churches. Clear introductions to the Gothic style can be found in the cloister, where the double archivolt arches supported by marble columns are, in two arms, pointed arches, the first example of the use of this element in Verona, as well as in the abbey tower where the windows take on larger dimensions and the alternation of brick and tuff is replaced by the exclusive use of terracotta masonry. Both structures date mostly from the thirteenth century, thus to a phase now late and just prior to transformations, particularly political ones, that would involve the city.

=== 13th and 14th centuries: the transition to Gothic style ===
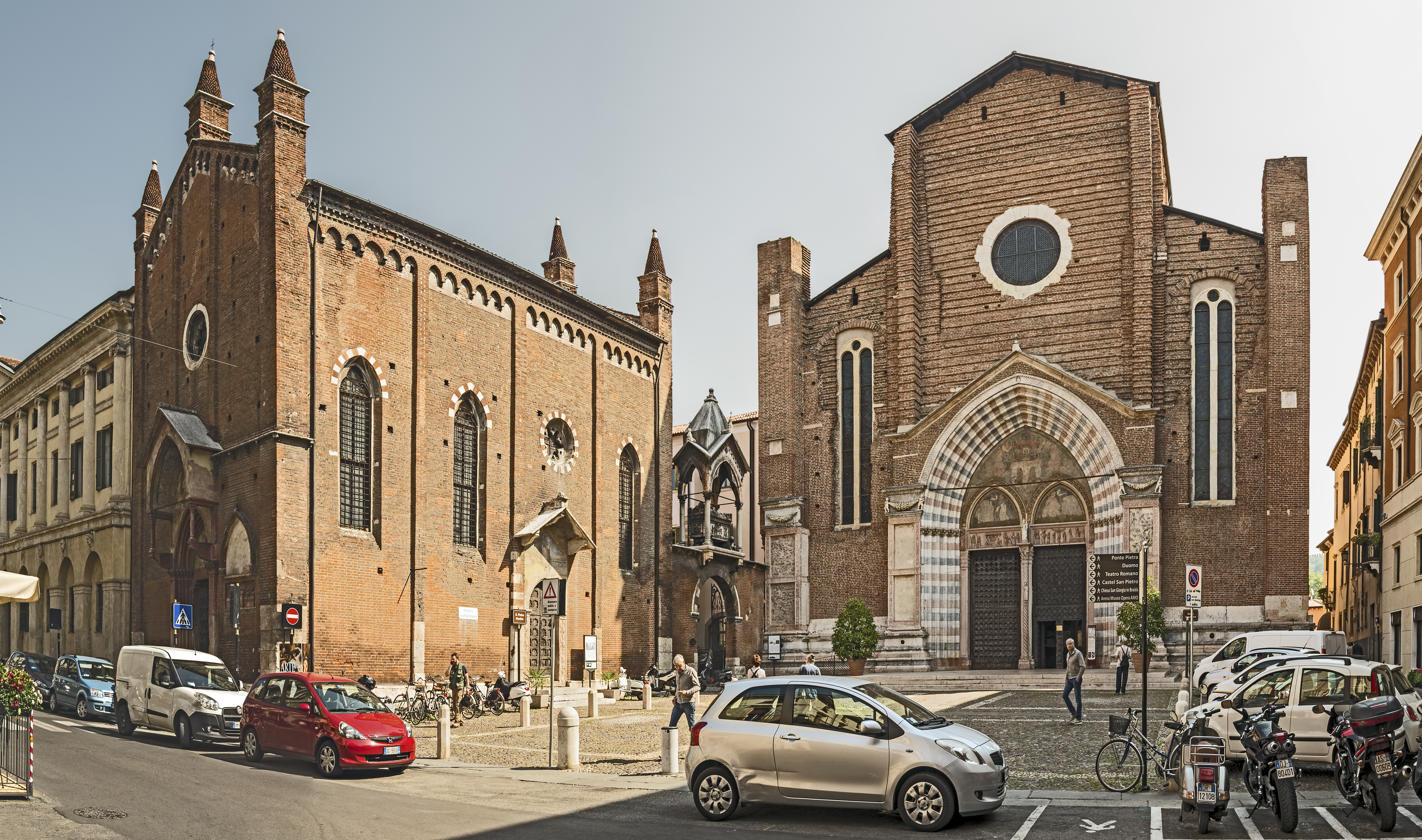
The St. Anastasia complex, with the basilica of the same name on the right and the church of St. Peter Martyr on the left, two of the most important examples of Veronese Gothic architecture; note the extensive use of terracotta and tall windows, as well as small arches under eaves, spires and pinnacles as decorative elements

The transition to a Gothic style occurred in the 13th century, at first involving not church buildings but rather relative outbuildings, where the Romanesque style began to give way to smoother, terracotta surfaces and simplified structures; Veronese Gothic architecture found its greatest expression in the flourishing of civil complexes and buildings, in castles and fortifications. The renewal of church structures and typologies took place in parallel with the building flourishing during the Scaliger seigniory, whose religious architecture partly resumed the style and technique. However, whereas in the Romanesque period religious architecture had found an original local style and led to the construction of a large number of churches, in the Gothic period, between the 13th and 15th centuries, the examples became less numerous and important; the churches that are built in this period therefore do not have such distinctly local features, rather they present cross-references to contemporary Lombard architecture, and the types of plans adopted are often to be found in the references of the religious orders that commissioned the work. The renewal of religious architecture in Verona is especially due to the establishment of new religious orders, which enjoyed the favor of the Della Scala family, princes of Verona, and the nobility.

The Veronese Gothic style is thus the same whether it is used for religious or civil construction: masonry surfaces undergo further decorative simplification, however, being enriched with flatly carved ferrules and decorative arches; brick becomes an almost exclusive material of masonry, giving a warm color to the buildings that characterize the city to this day; openings become larger in size, with round arches or tall biforas and monoforas that in height occupy the entire wall; roofs are almost always wooden trusses over wide spaces, usually not divided into bays; verticalism is further accentuated, even in civic architecture; spires and pinnacles are frequently used above the eave line.

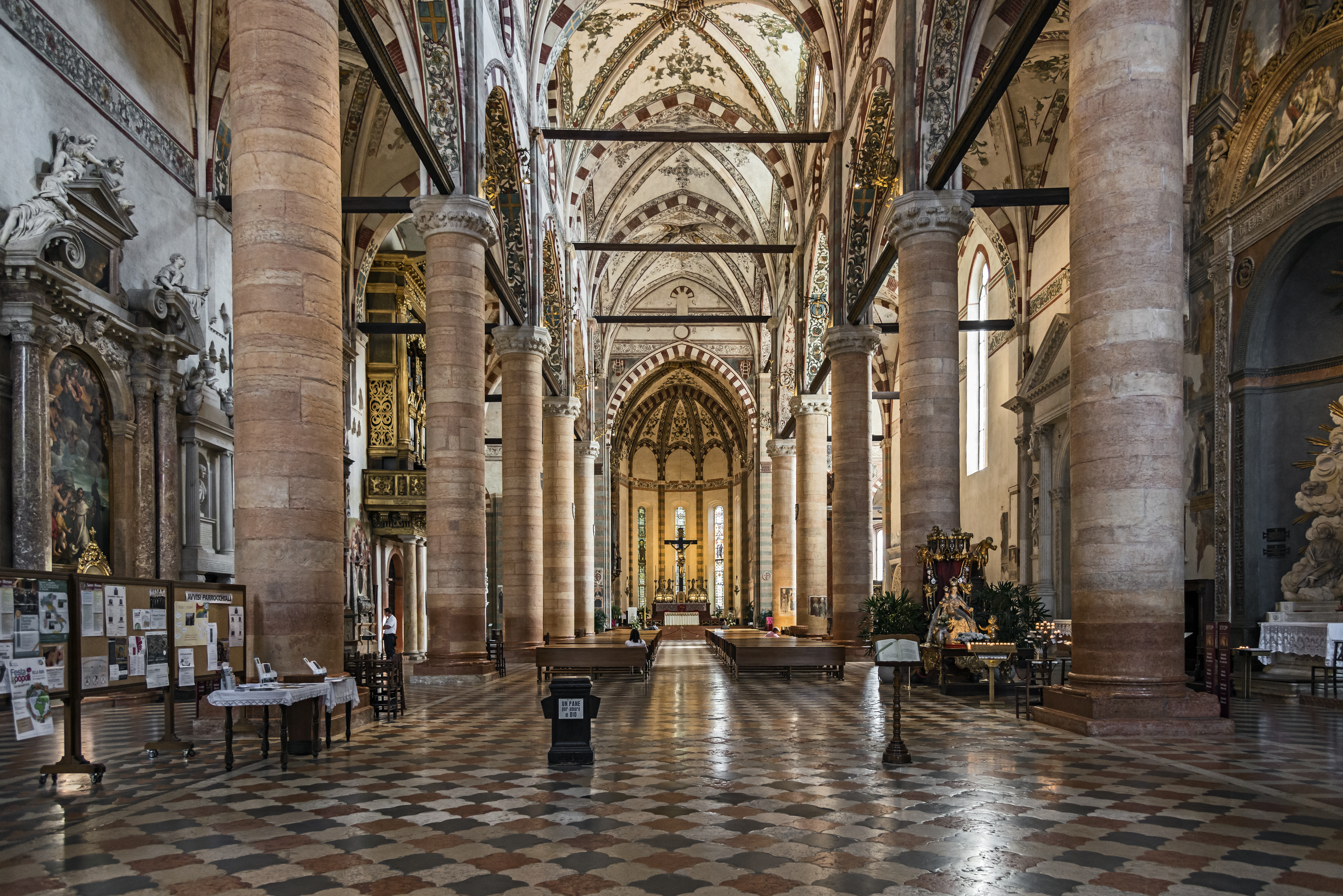
The interior of the basilica of St. Anastasia, characterized by the large cylindrical pillars with Gothic capitals and the great spatiality and brightness of the environment

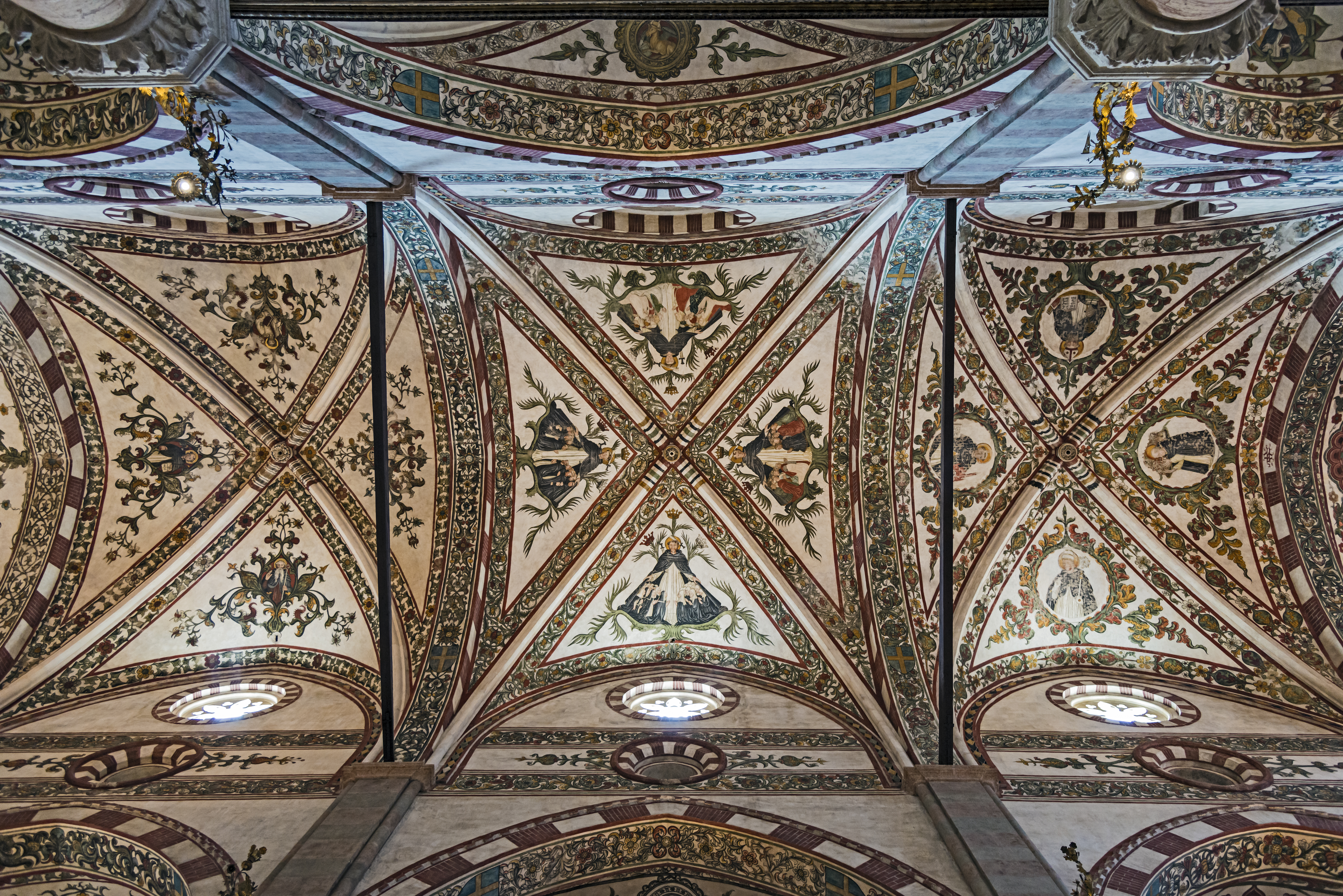
Rib vaults covering the nave, with oculi directly illuminating the nave

The Dominican basilica of St. Anastasia was the most far-reaching Gothic achievement in Verona, a fundamental reference point on which the building of other Veronese churches would be based, not only because of the renovations made to the plan, but also and especially because of the use of brick masonry and the new type of bell tower adopted. Construction of the new building began at the end of the 13th century, and the basic structures were finished in the third decade of the 14th century, although finishing work continued for a long time. Internally, the church is characterized by its division into three naves by means of mighty columns terminating in Gothic capitals, from which unravel arches and pointed rib vaults; the wide transept ends in a row of five apsidal chapels, and in the central one high monoforas open to illuminate the high altar. Externally, the façade is incomplete, yet it can be guessed how the exterior masonry was conceived as a skin for the interior space, as if it were a simple box enriched only with hanging arches and emphasized by large buttresses, which manage to channel the thrusts of the arches and interior vaults to the ground and accentuate the verticality of the building. The bell tower, also made of brick, introduces a new typology to the city that was very popular: verticality is emphasized by angular and intermediate pilasters that run throughout the shaft, divided into orders by elegant string-course cornices, covered no longer with the characteristic Romanesque conical pine cone but with a ribbed spire.

Along St. Anastasia Square, moreover, stands, as if it were a stage backdrop, the church of St. Peter Martyr; a simple brick structure punctuated by pilasters and crowned with Lombard bands and spires, while the interior, with a single hall, is divided into two large, airy bays.

Another religious order that took on great importance in the same years was that of the Servites, placed under the direct protectorate of the Lords of Verona, from whom they obtained numerous privileges and donations, including the land on which the church of Santa Maria della Scala would later be built, which was named after the Veronese princes. From the first decades of the 14th century, it had a very simple volume and a plan with three very wide naves; towards the outside, all in terracotta, large windows opened in the facade and in the apse area. The building was almost razed to the ground by bombing in World War II, from which only the bell tower, the perimeter walls and the Guantieri chapel were saved.

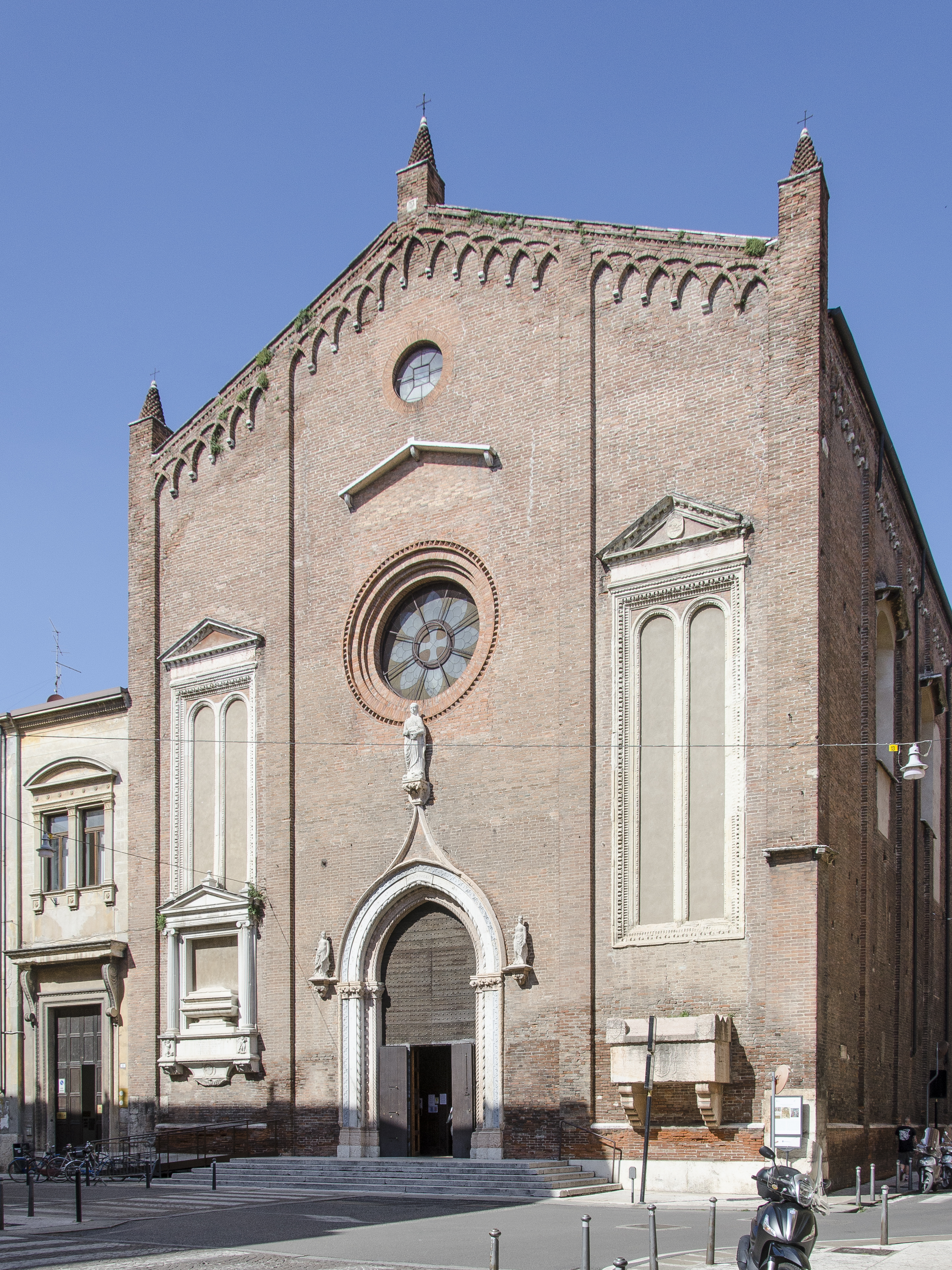
The facade of the church of St. Euphemia

The Augustinians, on the other hand, were responsible for the renovation of the church of Sant'Eufemia, built on the site of an earlier building: work began in 1275 and the church was consecrated in 1331, although later the apsidal area was enlarged and lengthened through a large bequest from Diamante, wife of the condottiero Giacomo Dal Verme, which enabled the reconstruction of the main apse in 1361, while on its side after 1390 the Spolverini Dal Verme chapel was added, based on a design by Nicolò da Ferrara. The complex also had two cloisters, one of which has survived to the present day but was transformed in the 17th century to a design by Lelio Pellesina. Externally, the church still presents its simple Gothic terracotta guise, with a gabled facade punctuated by two low pilasters and crowned by small arches, and on which only later were added a portal and two biforas with a now Renaissance style; finally, also on the outside, the apsidal area and the bell tower are strikingly reminiscent of the Santa Anastasia example. The interior, on the other hand, was transformed and renovated in the 18th century so that it no longer presents the original features, except for the Spolverini Dal Verme chapel, equipped with a very rich decorative structure, with pilasters and ogives in the apsidal basin.

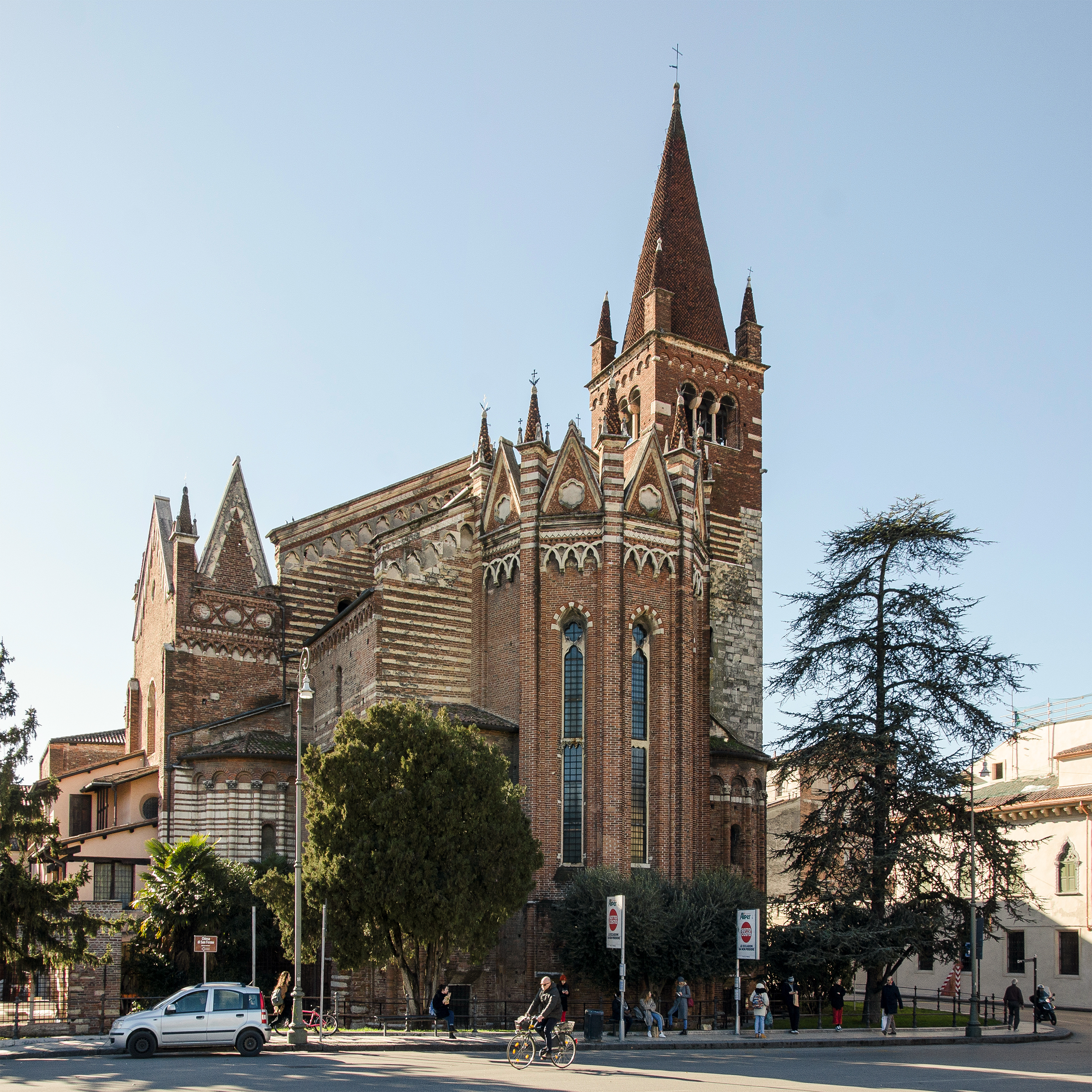
The apsidal area of the church of San Fermo Maggiore, rich in cusps and pinnacles

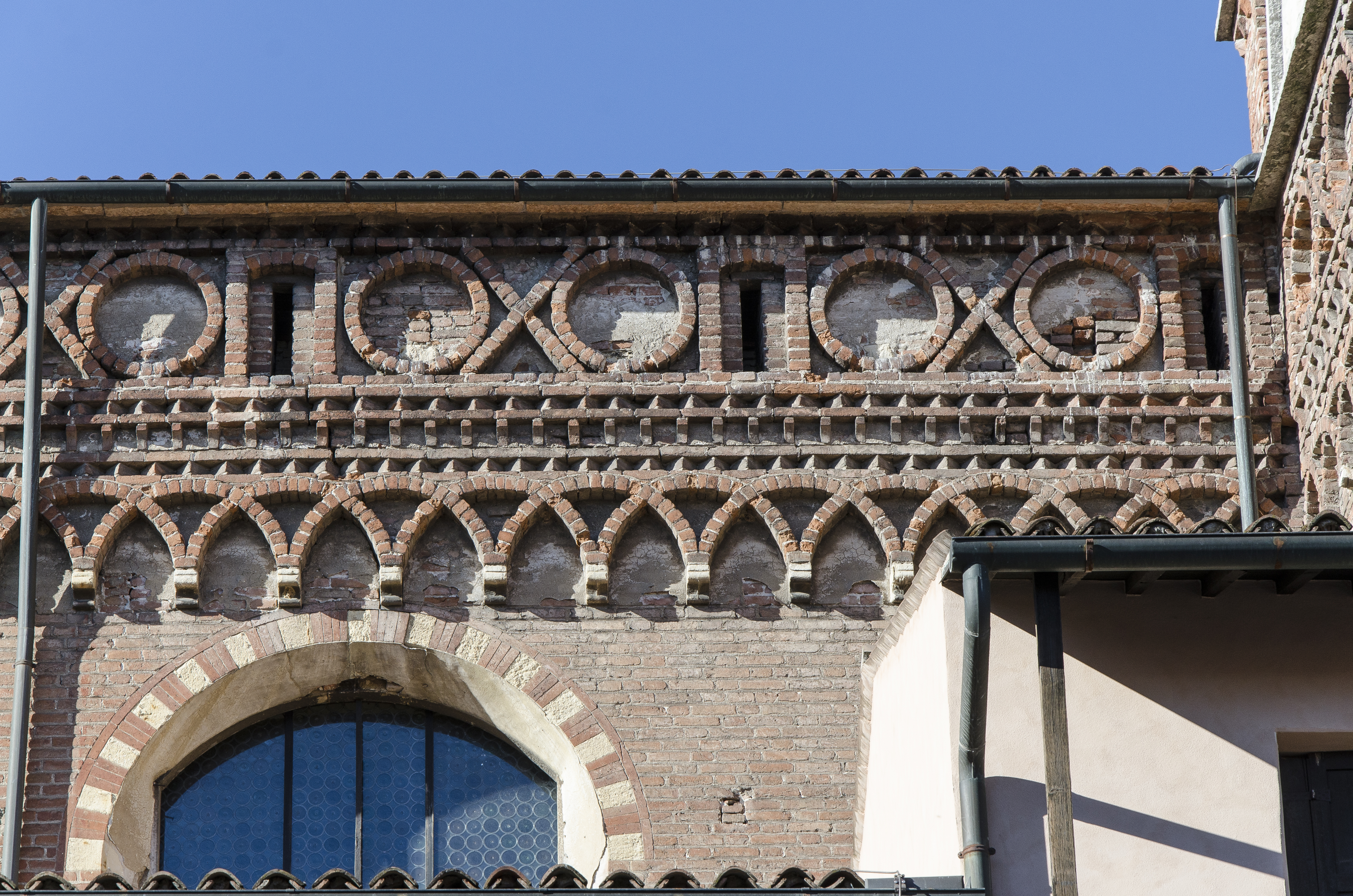
The elaborate cornices of the church

The Franciscans, who replaced the Benedictines in 1260 following some disputes, are finally responsible for the Gothic renovation of the upper church of San Fermo, one of the main Franciscan monuments in northern Italy. Precisely because of the continuing disputes between the Benedictines and the Franciscans, work was delayed and did not begin until the 14th century, so the transformations implemented were definitely under the influence of a mature Gothic style, which, however, avoided the use of architectural elements that were too complex or articulated. The works brought about numerous changes: for example, the space was reduced to a single nave in order to create an airy and solemn environment, which is why the perimeter walls were also raised and the hall covered by a characteristic and elegant wooden false ceiling in the form of an inverted ship's keel, in the Venetian style. In addition, the luministic aspect was turned upside down, raising the apse and opening three long monoforas, opening other tall windows along the nave, and making a wide quadrifora in the center of the facade, from which a great deal of light bursts in. On the outside, the façade was renovated, where the Veronese tradition of alternating bands of tuff and terracotta was resumed, but above all the apsidal area was transformed, where the cornices became more elaborate and decorative, with the use of Lombard bands, tracery, and circle motifs, and a large number of cusps, pinnacles, and spires were raised. The back thus takes on an elaborate late Gothic style, which finds many affinities in the decidedly Nordic and almost fairytale-like complex of the Scaliger tombs.

Few were the noteworthy new buildings compared to those of the Romanesque period. However, beyond the church structures, the city acquired a Gothic character in those centuries especially due to the numerous military, residential, public and private buildings. Despite this, in the 15th century some characteristics of Gothic churches continued to persist, especially in the exterior appearance, with the use of brick, tall monoforas and biforas, and the same type of bell tower, which went to mix with proto-Renaissance elements and styles, as in the church of San Tomaso Cantuariense or the facade of the church of San Bernardino.

=== 15th century: the great renovation sites ===
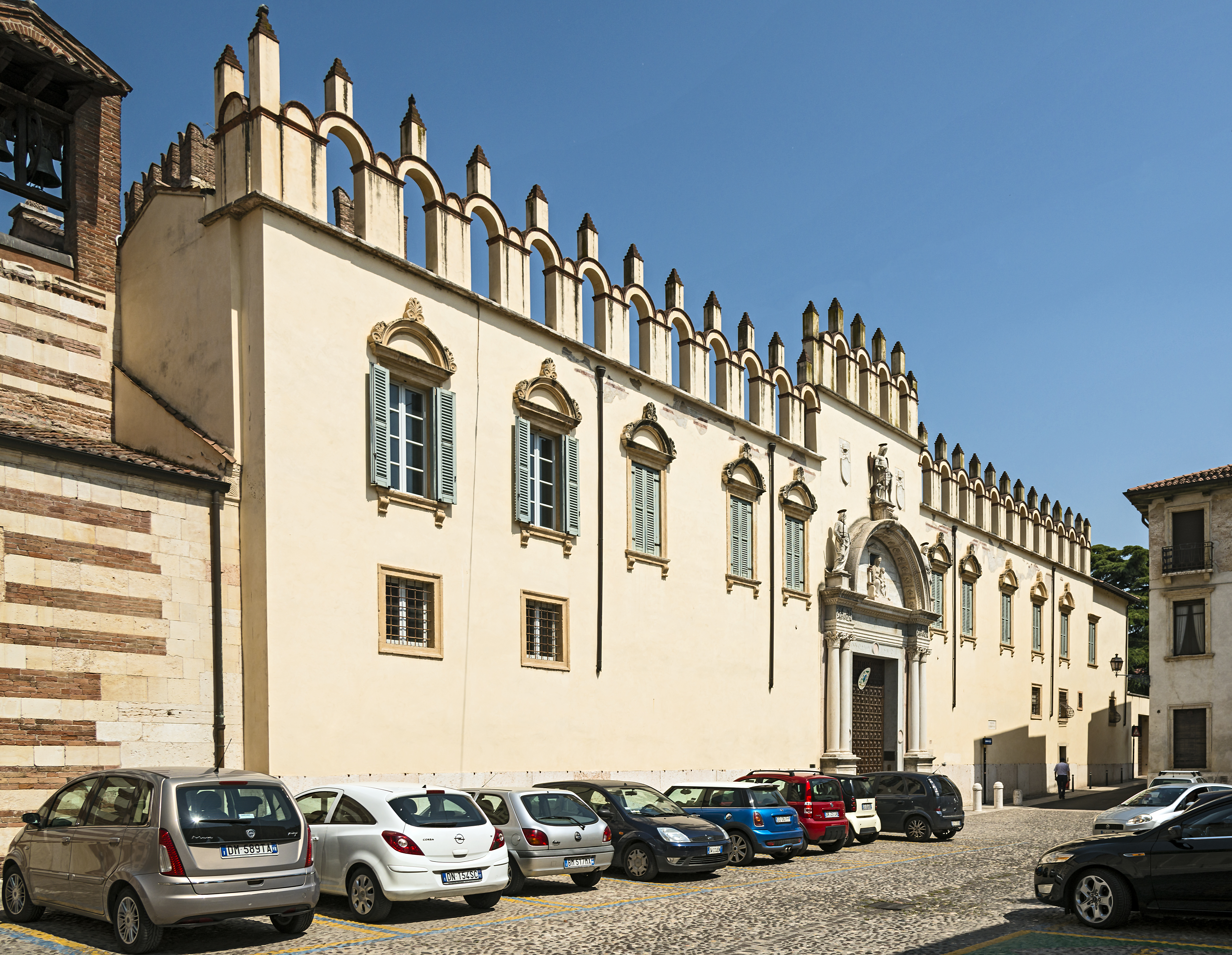
The Renaissance facade of the Bishop's Palace, commissioned by Venetian bishop and cardinal Giovanni Michiel in the late 15th century

The 15th century was a century of great changes both politically, because of Verona's devotion to Venice, and from the point of view of religious institutions: the beginning of the century, with the removal of the Scaligeri from the top of the ecclesiastical hierarchies, was not easy, all the more so because the major institutions went into commenda, including the bishopric, leading in some cases to even more degraded situations. From this time on, therefore, bishops and titulars of abbeys were no longer Veronese but Venetians, or at any rate people belonging to the most important aristocratic families of Veneto. Nevertheless, after a complex beginning, the situation slowly evolved and there was a flourishing of numerous ecclesiastical institutions not only financially or spiritually, but also in terms of artistic heritage, precisely due to the presence of the Venetian clergy and especially the Venetian religious congregations. In particular, the Venetian bishops Guido Memo, Francesco Condulmer, Ermolao Barbaro and Giovanni Michiel were responsible for the introduction of these new congregations between 1409 and 1503, who renovated the existing church buildings from a building point of view; they also personally engaged in the renovation of the Cathedral and the Bishop's Palace.

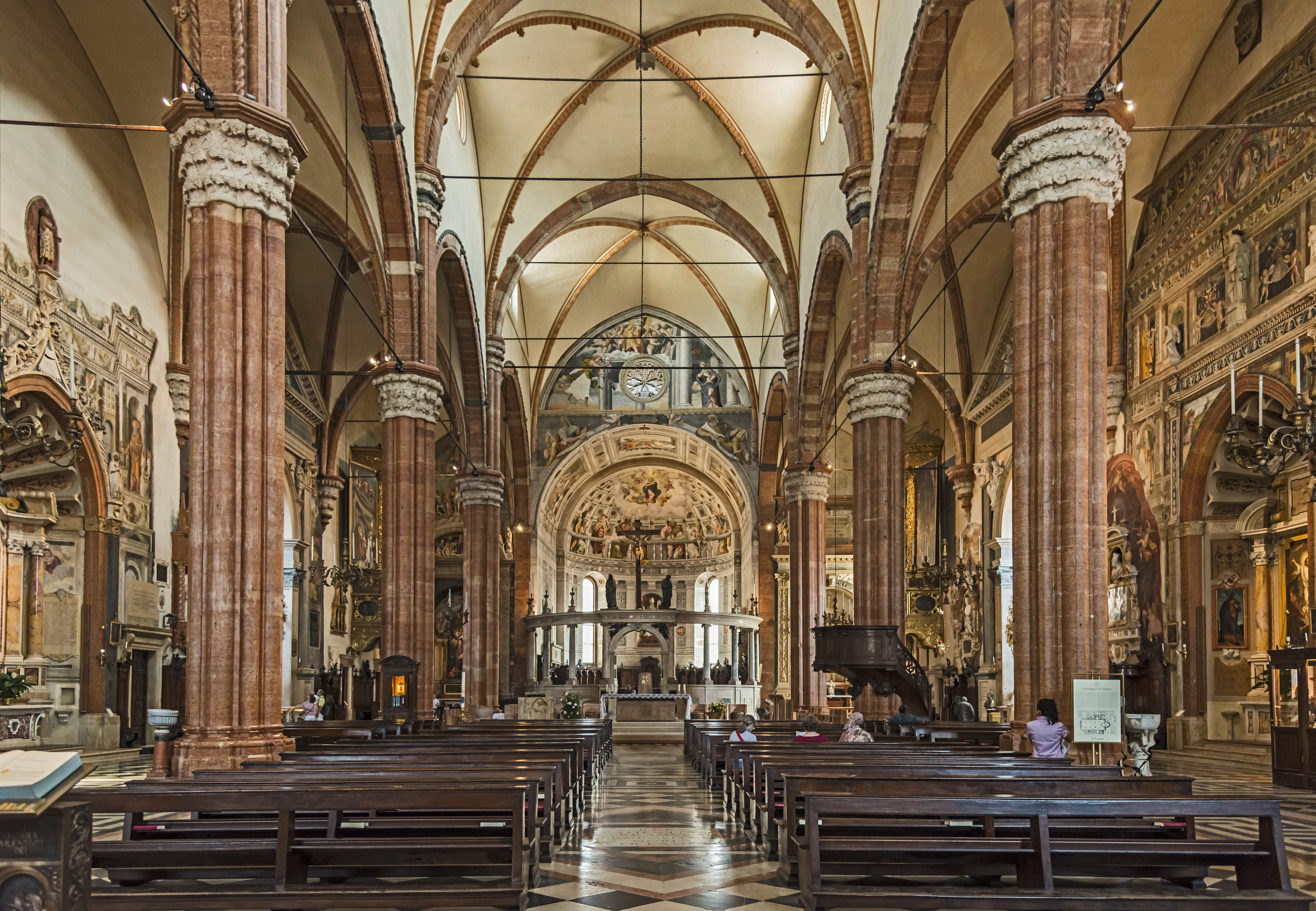
The late Gothic interior of Verona Cathedral, characterized by its bundled pillars and ribbed cross vaults

The whole of the first part of the century was therefore one of settling in and saw no great novelties from the architectural point of view, while a strong momentum occurred from the 1440s onwards when some of the abandoned, or almost abandoned, monasteries were entrusted to the aforementioned congregations, which were very active in the other territories of the Serenissima and were waiting to be able to find new space in Verona: in 1442 the monastery of Santi Nazaro e Celso was entrusted to that of Santa Giustina, a Paduan congregation; in the same year the monastery of San Giorgio in Braida was assigned to the Venetian congregation of San Giorgio in Alga; and the monastery of Santa Maria in Organo, formerly of the Benedictines and initially given in commenda to Antonio Correr, was given in 1444 to the Olivetans. These thus became Verona's main fifteenth-century church-building renovation sites, along with those for the cathedral, begun in 1144, and those for the construction of the church and convent of San Bernardino in 1451.

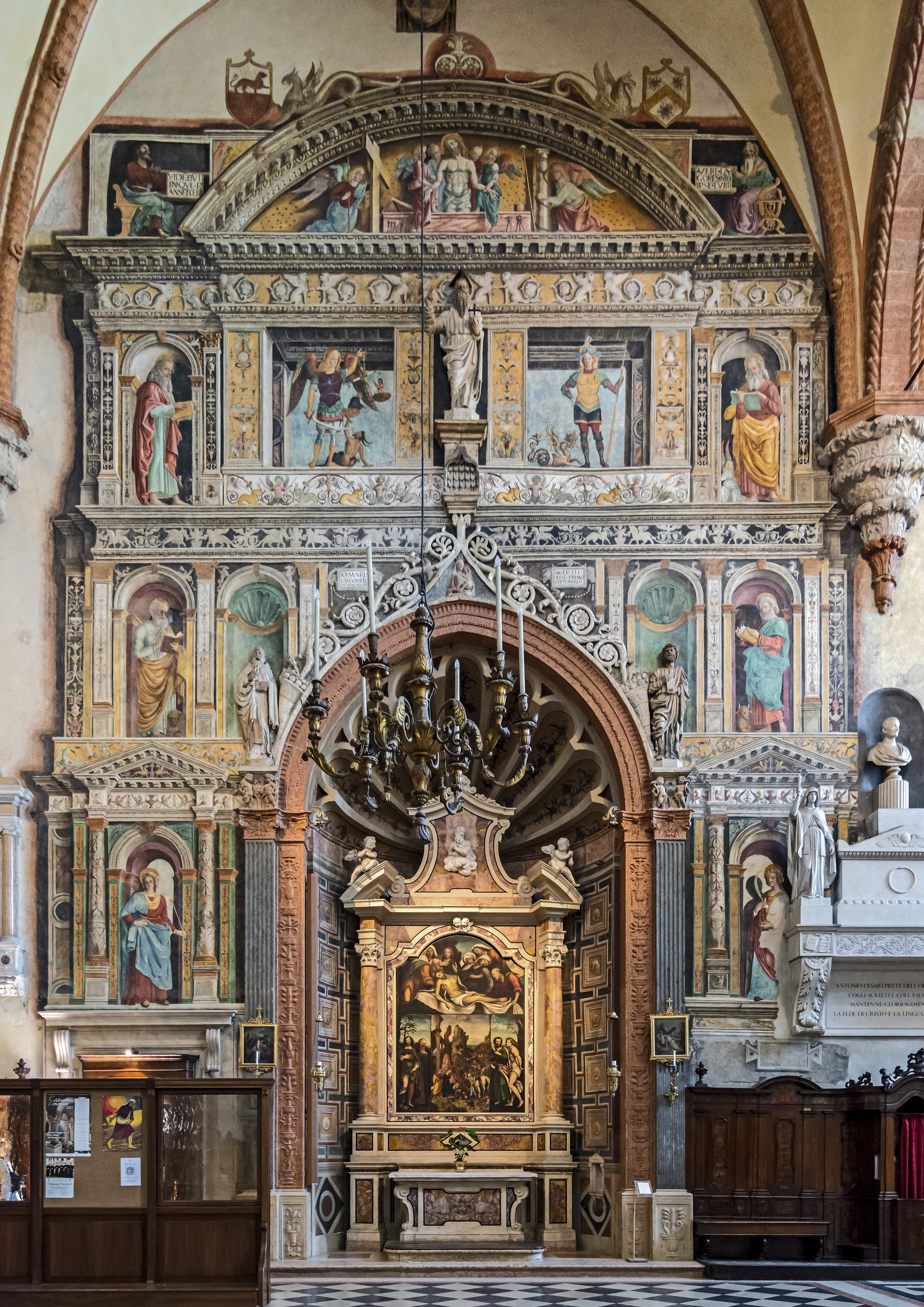
The Renaissance Calcasoli Chapel at the cathedral, surrounded by the painted architecture of Gian Maria Falconetto

As far as the Verona cathedral is concerned, the transformation project actually originated in the second half of the 14th century but was only partially realized between 1444 and 1503, so architecturally the structure still appears to have a Gothic feel, especially because of the presence of bundled pillars from which the ribs unravel that overlap the rib vaults, in a manner very similar to that which had been experimented in the church of San Petronio in Bologna and which would later be developed for the Milan cathedral. On the other hand, a completely different style was used in the six chapels added in the last part of the building site, along the sides of the side aisles: in fact, these retain elements typical of a Renaissance spatiality, given by the presence of a large interior arch framed by two pilasters surmounted by a hint of entablature. These are also characterized by a shell-shaped basin and by large painted architectures framing them, which only came to light again during the 1870s. Two side chapels of much greater size than those just mentioned were then planned, one on the southern and one on the northern side, and placed immediately before the chancel to make them assume the role of a transept, thus transforming the plan of the church into a Latin cross, in place of the basilical one that characterized the Romanesque building.

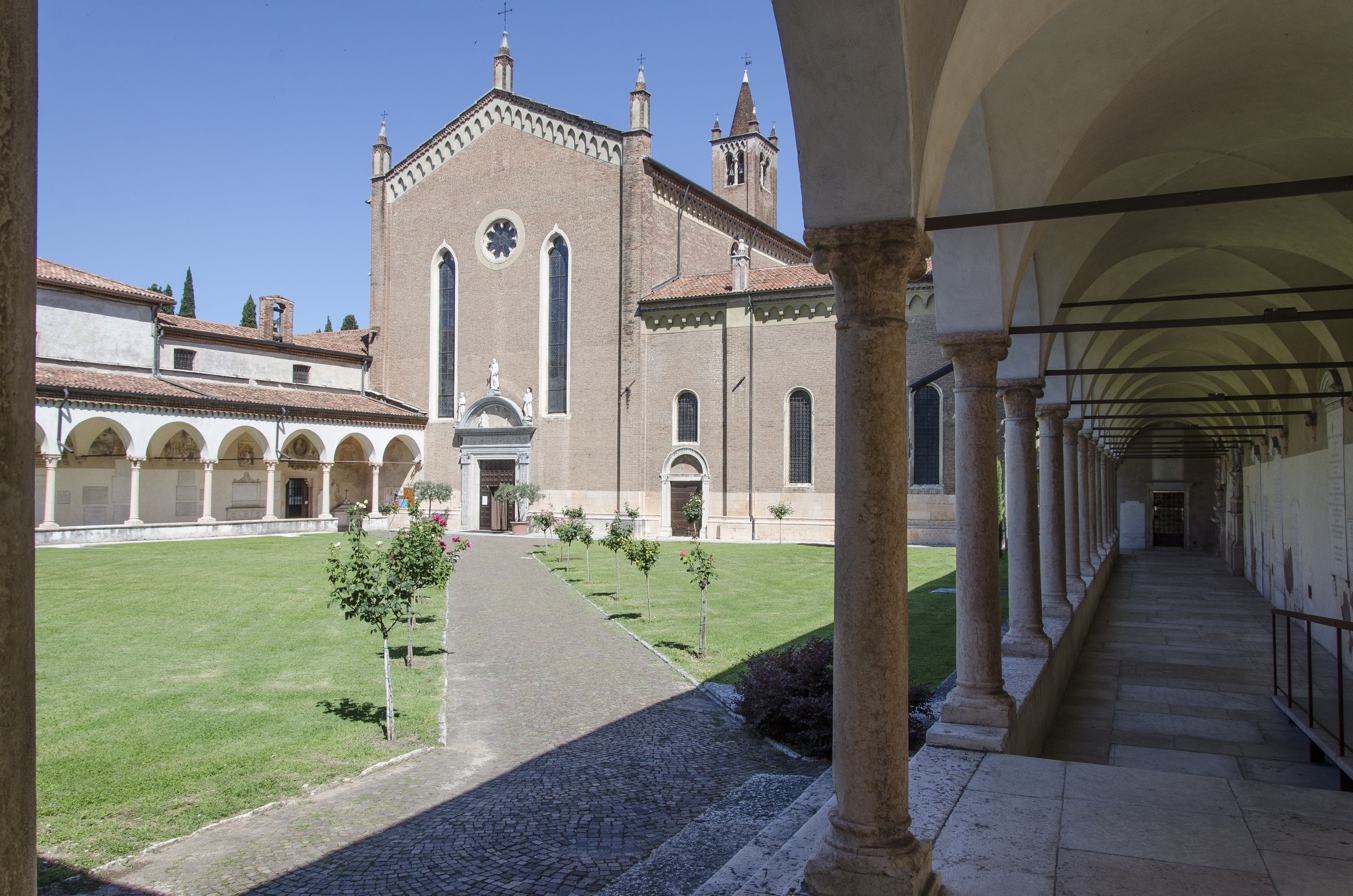
The church of San Bernardino, still characterized by a Gothic style except for the entrance portal

Another building still manifestly Gothic is the church of San Tomaso Cantuariense, as is particularly apparent from its appearance, albeit incomplete, exterior, despite the fact that this building site, too, had been started in the second half of the century. Not even the church of San Bernardino can certainly be said to be of Renaissance style; the interior, with a single nave, has rather limited architectural qualities, perhaps due to the modesty of the Franciscan patronage, although at the end of the century the building was ennobled by the construction, along the right flank, of some elaborate chapels: the Medici chapel, or of St. Anthony, and the Avanzi chapel, or of the Cross. At the same time as the work on the church, work was also carried out on the convent, organized around three large cloisters and one smaller one, directed by John of Capistrano. Particularly valuable work was the large rectangular hall, which was initially used as a library, but was emptied and frescoed by Domenico Morone, after whom the room itself is named.

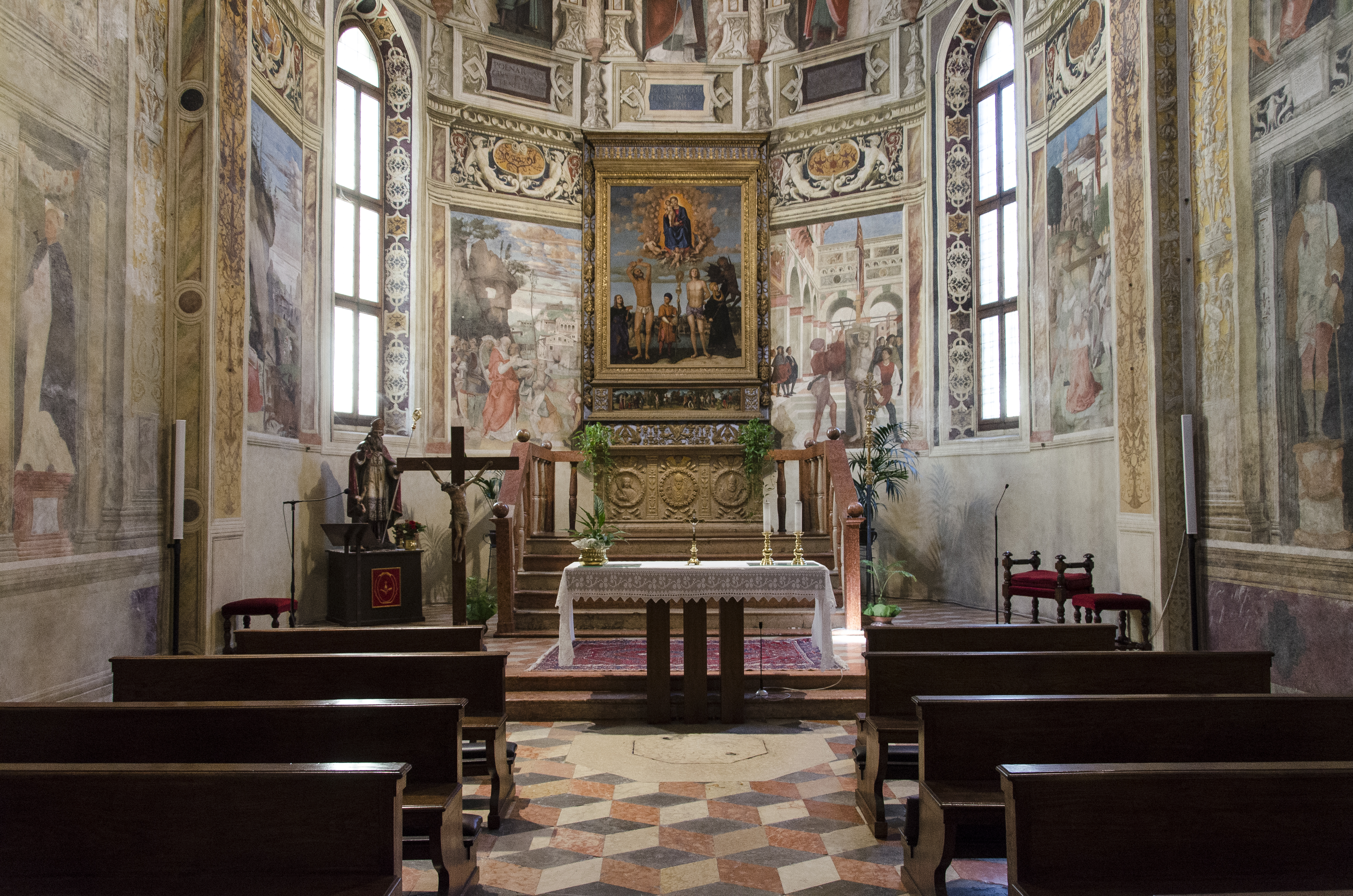
The chapel of St. Blaise in the church of Saints Nazaro and Celso

The Renaissance, however, made its entry into Verona more decisively with the reconstruction and renovation of the aforementioned churches of Santi Nazaro e Celso, San Giorgio in Braida, and Santa Maria in Organo, where the new congregations imported the new Renaissance architectural style into the city. The most substantial part of the building site of the first church took place between 1464 and 1466, work probably continued until the date of its consecration in 1483: this intervention resulted in a plan with three naves ending in as many apses, with the naves having six bays each and divided between them by Doric pillars on high bases, which support Ionic pilasters on which the girdle arches of the vaults are set. However, one can still note the presence of transverse pointed arches along the side aisles, with cross-vaulted roofing. At a later stage, starting in 1488, further work involved the building of the chapel of St. Blaise along the left aisle of the church: this is a room with a central plan covered by a dome, with two side niches and concluded by an apse equipped with a ribbed umbrella vault, this one of late Gothic style and probably the work of Beltrame di Valsoda. In this space there was the debut of the young painter Giovanni Maria Falconetto, who rejected that combination of a classical central plan and a Gothic apse, thus realizing a real painted architecture, of Renaissance style and contentious toward the apse made by Beltrame.

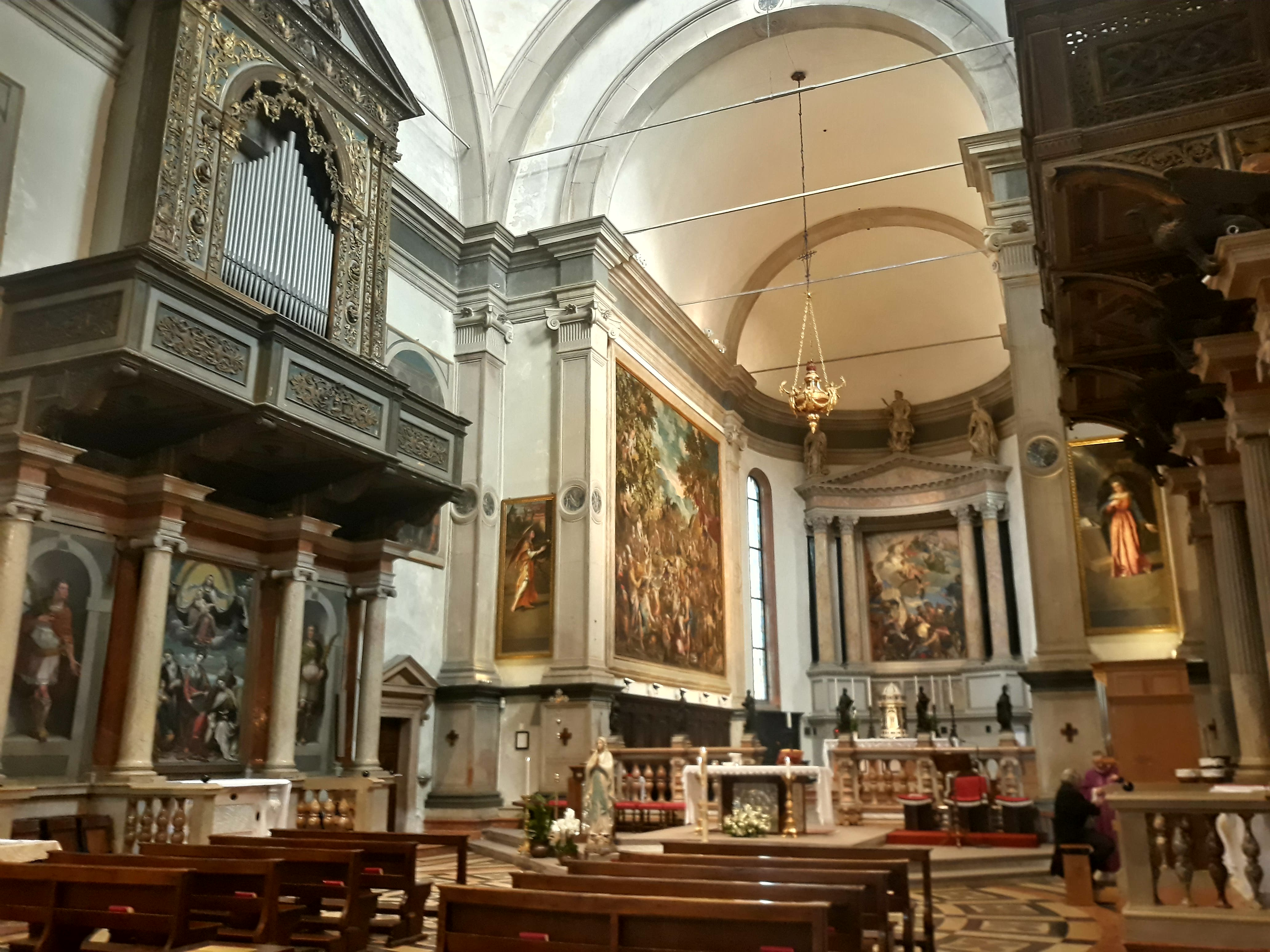
The interior of the church of San Giorgio in Braida, one of the most important Renaissance relics in Verona, partly because of the many works of art it holds, including Veronese's Martyrdom of St. George

The interior of the church of San Giorgio in Braida, on the other hand, evidently makes reference to Venetian architecture, as the congregation that took possession of it was Venetian; it was begun in 1477 by Antonio Rizzo, an architect who worked in Venice on the building sites of the Procuratie and the Doge's Palace, and who in Verona was asked, among other things, to design the Loggia del Consiglio, which had been erected in Piazza dei Signori the year before. In the meantime, work was also done in the monastery, particularly on the construction of a second cloister, of which only five round arches set on red Verona marble columns have survived, visible by the apse of the church.

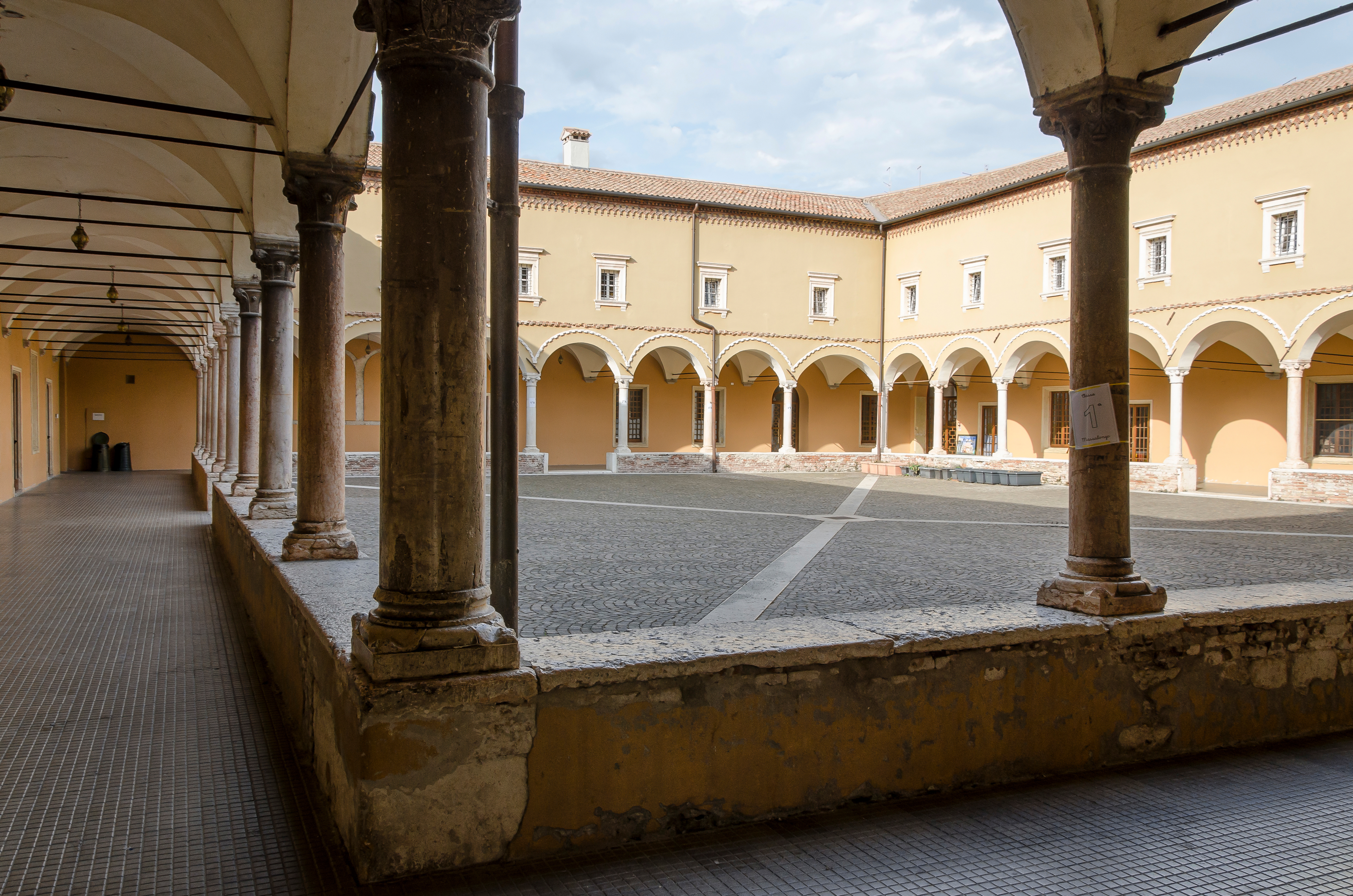
The cloister of the monastery of Santa Maria in Organo

A little later there was the start of work in the church of Santa Maria in Organo where the interior was renovated in Renaissance forms, with the reconstruction of the aisles and side chapels, possibly by the architect Biagio Rossetti, who in previous years worked on the cloister of the convent of San Bartolomeo in Rovigo and the bell tower of the church of San Giorgio in Ferrara, all monasteries belonging to the Olivetans. They did not limit themselves to renovating the church, but also committed themselves to the adjoining monastery, where it is still possible to admire a fine cloister with red Verona marble columns and Renaissance capitals, crowned at the top by a terracotta frieze still in the Gothic style. The commitment of the patrons, who continued the building sites into the next century (as was the case with other buildings that were started during this period), was rewarded by Pope Eugene IV, who even exempted them from making contributions to the cathedral's renovations.

This period saw the multiplication of chapels in the sides of churches, a phenomenon that had begun as early as the 14th century, but which from the 15th century onwards saw the demand for altars multiply; very often they were chapels for private use by wealthy families or by confraternities, who placed there the tombs of their relatives and who made use of those spaces for the suffrages of the dead; in other cases chapels or altars were instead purchased and built by the guilds of arts and crafts, which dedicated them to the worship of their patrons. These chapels could be simple altars located within niches, but in some cases they took on much larger proportions, until they became small churches placed at the flanks of the large one; it was a phenomenon that did not "spare" even the three large churches built in the fourteenth century by the mendicant orders, St. Anastasia, St. Fermo and St. Euphemia, where the tall Gothic monoforas on the flanks were gradually closed in order to make room for the new chapels.

=== 16th century: Sanmicheli and the Veronese Renaissance ===
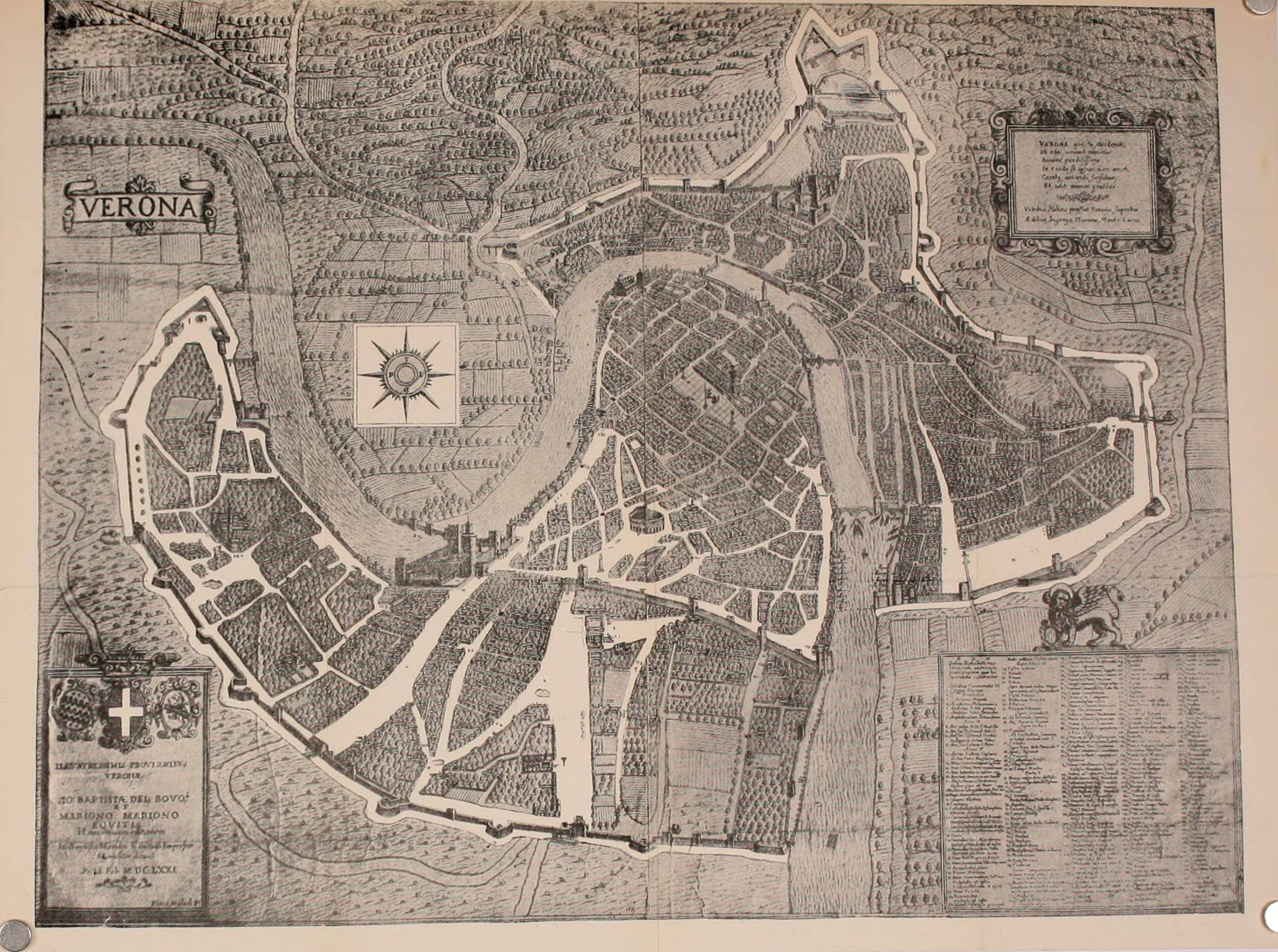
The plan of the city after the construction of the esplanades outside the walls, which caused the relocation of churches, convents, and monasteries within the perimeter of the fortified walls

While the second half of the 15th century in Verona was characterized by a renewal of ecclesiastical institutions, the 16th century brought the reorganization of religious life, especially of nuns, due to the Constitutiones issued by Bishop Gian Matteo Giberti and the subsequent introduction of the dictates of the Council of Trent by his successors; the new legislation brought some provisions for sacred buildings so that churches, monasteries and convents were adapted to meet the new requirements. A second factor that brought great upheaval to city building was the execution of the esplanades: between 1517 and 1518, the Venetian Senate decided to make the city more secure from enemy attacks, so all buildings, including churches, monasteries, and even trees, located within a mile of Verona's Scaliger walls were completely demolished. Several settlements, even large ones, stood outside the city, making it impossible to avoid possible encirclement by enemies, who in fact had managed to reach the city gates in the past, particularly during the most difficult phases of the war of the League of Cambrai, which took place between 1508 and 1516. The construction of the so-called "esplanade" around the city was a prerequisite for the reconstruction of most of these monasteries and churches within the perimeter of the city walls.

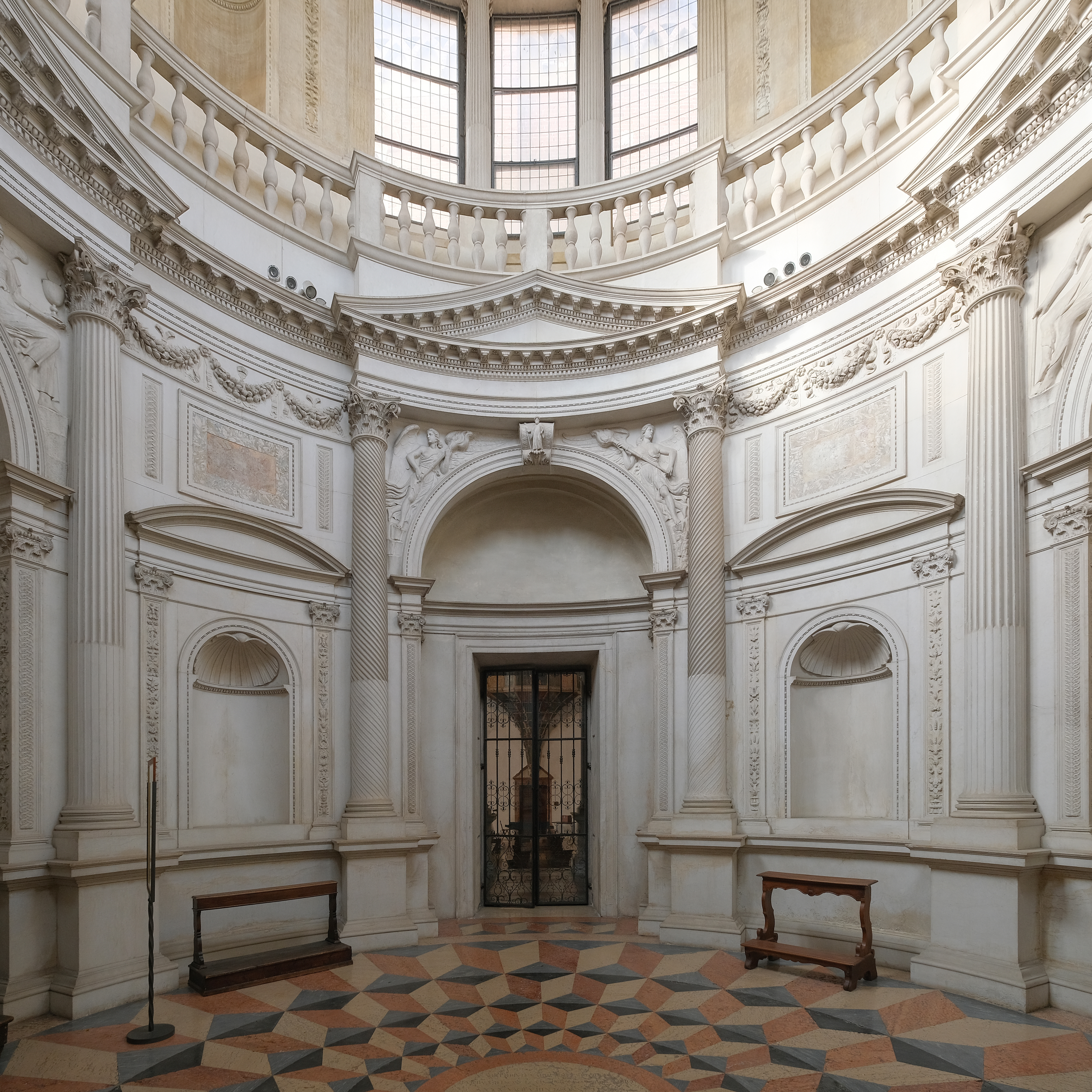
The first order of the Renaissance Pellegrini Chapel, the work of architect Michele Sanmicheli

In the meantime, in the large building sites that had begun in the second half of the 15th century, the main work on the masonry structures had been completed, however, the constructions continued in the 16th century with finishing and completion work; it was at this time that the best-known of Veronese architects, Michele Sanmicheli, entered the scene, and he was the third element of fundamental importance for the history of sacred buildings in this century for Verona, along with the two already mentioned. He was active in several building sites, such as in the church of San Bernardino: at the same time that work on the convent was nearing completion, the building of new chapels on the right side of the church building was in full swing, including the monumental Pellegrini chapel, designed by Sanmicheli. He worked on it from the last months of 1527, drawing on his extensive knowledge of classical models; the refined, centrally planned chapel was even described by Vasari as the most beautiful in Italy. What is certain is that for the first time in Verona, a dome set on a drum was built in this structure, a characteristic element of Sanmichelian architecture that he employed in several later works: in the church of San Giorgio in Braida, of which he made only the drum and dome, in the church of the Madonna di Campagna, and in the temple set in the center of the Lazzaretto in Verona.

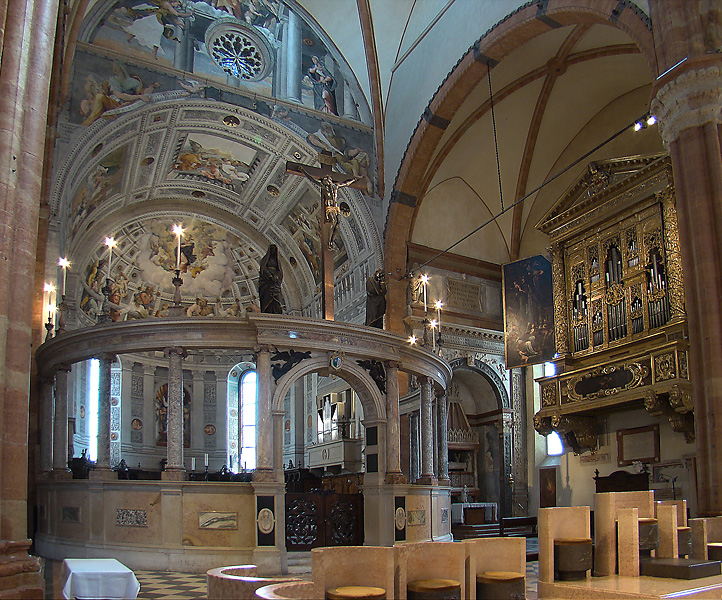
The Sanmichelian presbytery enclosure in Verona Cathedral and in the background the fresco by Francesco Torbido based on preparatory drawings by Giulio Romano

A few years later in the Cathedral, where in the meantime renovation work was continuing, Sanmicheli was commissioned to design the presbytery enclosure, most likely designed in 1535 and executed in 1541. It is an "extreme" version of an iconostasis, that is, a partition conceived by the architect as a plastic structure in which the element of Venetian tradition is renewed by adopting a Renaissance plan; he thus obtained an autonomous structure of ellipsoidal plan, intended to protect and at the same time exalt the Eucharistic presence, previously housed in a storeroom at the side of the chancel. Also due to him, with the assistance in the execution of his cousin Bernardino Brugnoli, was the design of the bell tower. The tower was set on the solid foundations of the Romanesque belfry, which had been demolished for the occasion, although it seems that during the construction, in the absence of the architect, the bishop entrusted the direction of the work to others so as to speed up its completion, and yet upon reaching the belfry there was a partial collapse of the structure. Work resumed only upon the return of Sanmicheli, who made some changes to the original design, although the construction ended in 1579 and his project remained unfinished; the elevation of the belfry was resumed only in 1913 on the design of architect Ettore Fagiuoli, who reinterpreted Sanmicheli's style, but even on this occasion the work could not be completed, leaving the execution of the planned loggia crowned with a spire unfinished.

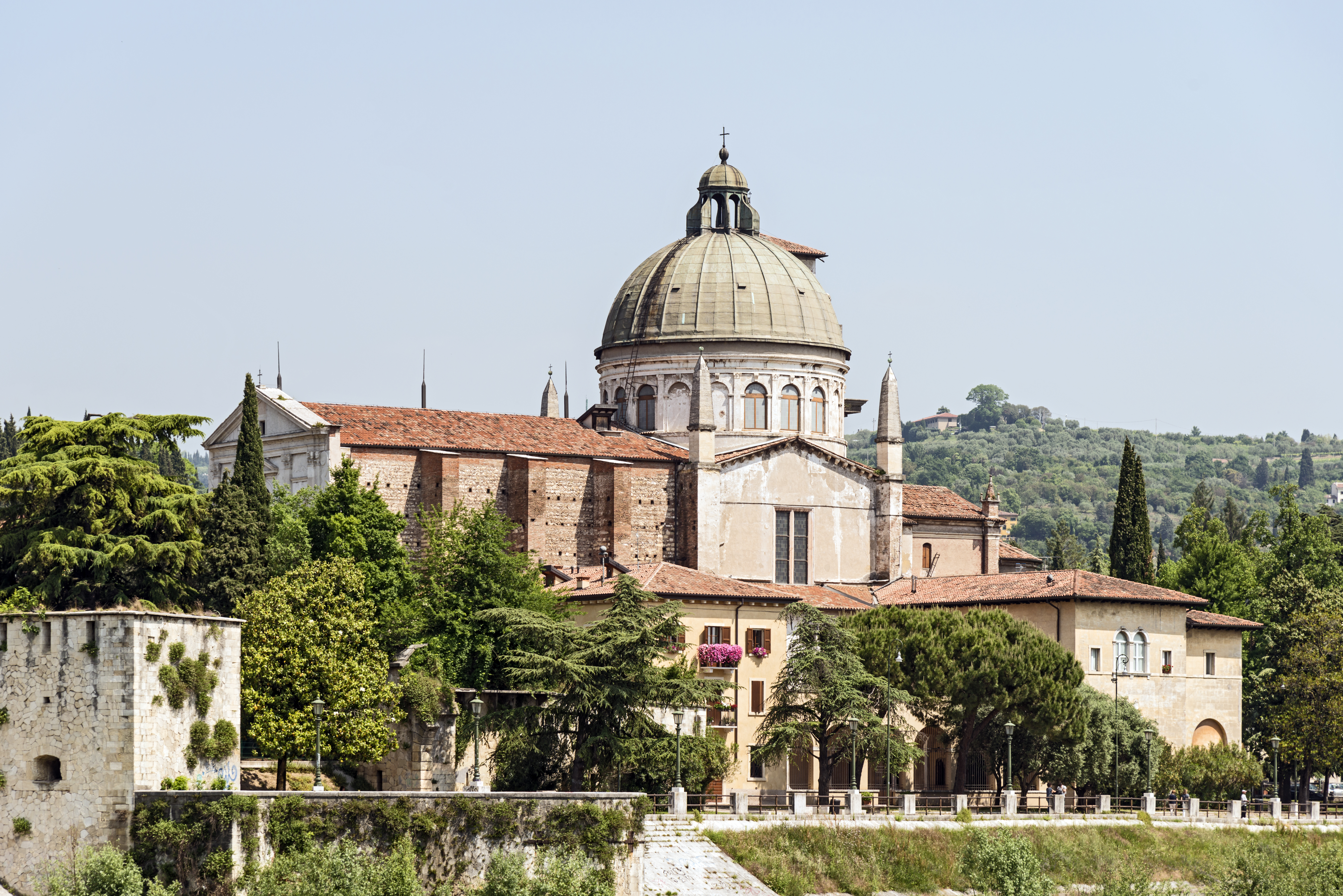
The church of San Giorgio in Braida with Sanmicheli's prominent dome

Also in the church of San Giorgio in Braida Sanmicheli intervened in two moments: first in 1540 to graft the imposing dome onto the now-complete building, and later in the design of the bell tower, again assisted by the architect Borelli and also in this case left unfinished. A few years earlier and by an unknown author, on the other hand, is the realization of the rectangular cloister located at the side of the church, characterized by a first level of Ionic columns in Veronese limestone which, along the northern side, doubles in height due to the presence of a loggia with columns of Doric order, which have a pitch half as long as that of the colonnade on the lower level. At the bottom it still has, like the medieval cloisters of Verona, the stylobate in plastered masonry surmounted by a simple stone cover, while at the top the columns support, by means of corbels set into the wall, the rib vaults covering the perimeter corridors; the cloister thus demonstrates a simple and still unripe design, albeit well harmonized with the surrounding structures.

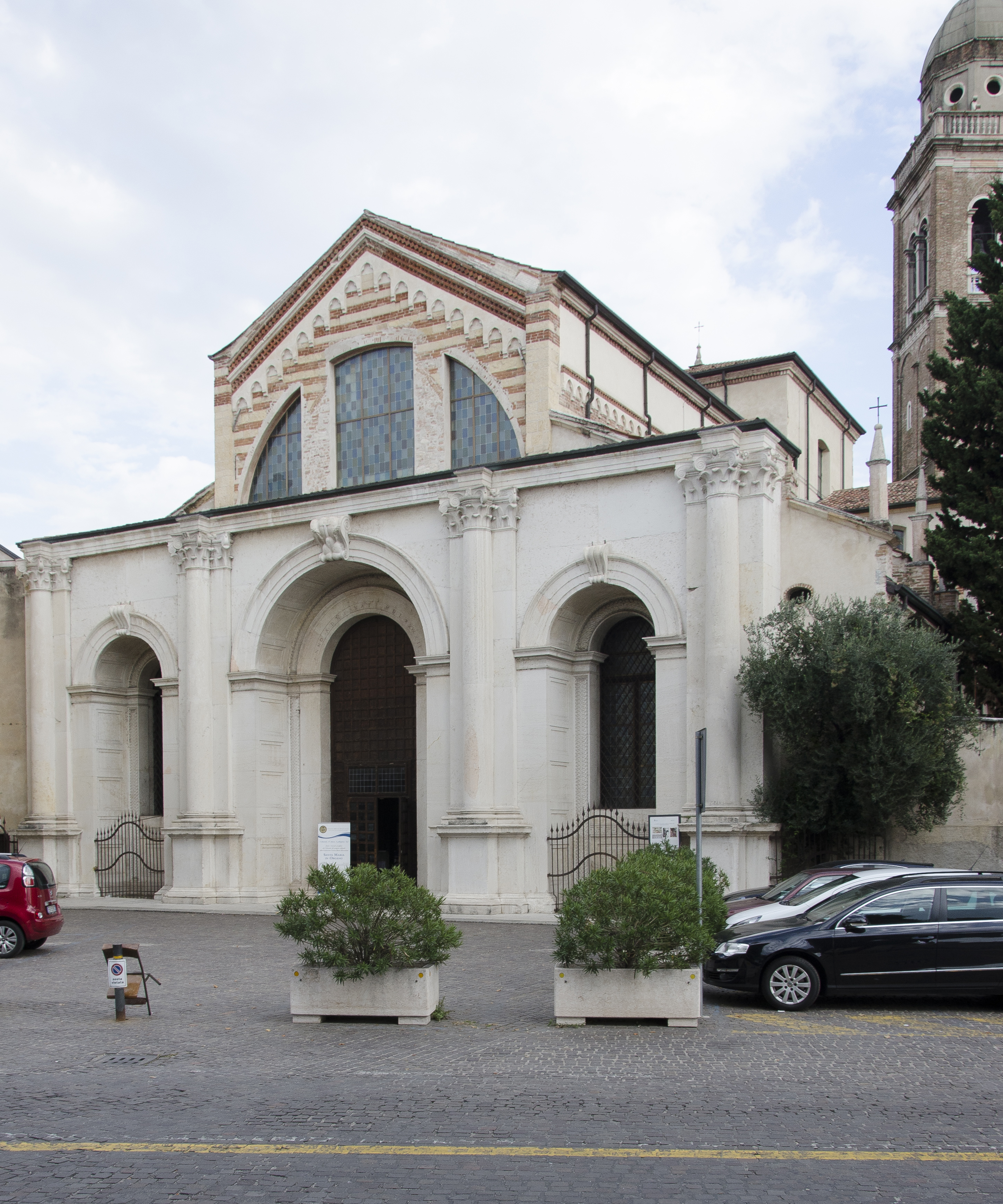
The facade of Santa Maria in Organo with the work of Michele Sanmicheli at the bottom and the Romanesque part at the top

Sanmicheli next designed the facade of the church of Santa Maria in Organo, the work of which he was commissioned by Abbot Cipriani. Completed in 1592 only in the lower part, the Veronese master devised a monumental marble facade inspired by the Malatesta temple in Rimini, with three large semicircular arches separated by columns and massive pilasters. However, work in the monastery did not stop with the Sanmichelian facade, which was preceded in 1504 by the construction of the new sacristy, which a few years later was enriched with the famous espaliers with wooden inlays by Fra Giovanni da Verona, while in 1525 work was resumed on the bell tower, designed by the friar himself but finished after his death by the stone mason Francesco da Castello who in all likelihood also directed work on the completion of the interior of the church building and the construction in 1517 of the Ionic cloister, of which only traces survive but which may be considered the first evidence in the Verona Renaissance of the assumption of a Roman and classical model by an architect.

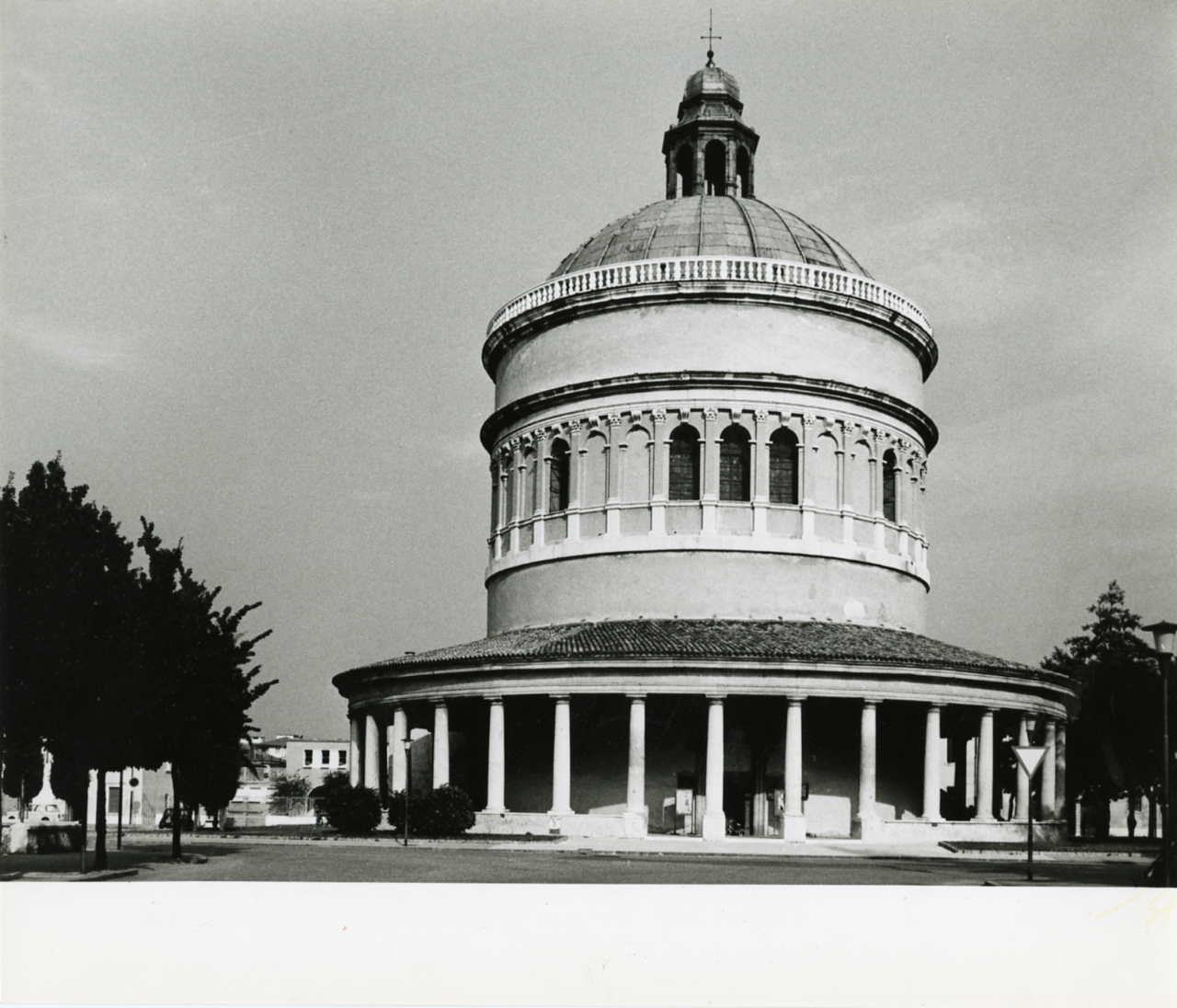
The church of Madonna di Campagna in a 1972 photograph by Paolo Monti

Finally, the last church building designed by the Veronese master, the church of Madonna di Campagna, whose construction began in 1559, the year of the architect's death, and ended in 1589; precisely because of its posthumous completion, the building actually built may not fully reflect Sanmicheli's original designs, or at least Vasari asserts that there are some substantial differences. The church, with a central plan, is surrounded by an interesting portico that Sanmicheli wanted not only to provide cover, but also to recall classical Roman temples such as the Temple of Vesta in Rome and the Temple of the Sibyl in Tivoli. Also distinctive is the fact that while the exterior of the church appears circular (though actually more like an oval) the interior has an octagonal plan.

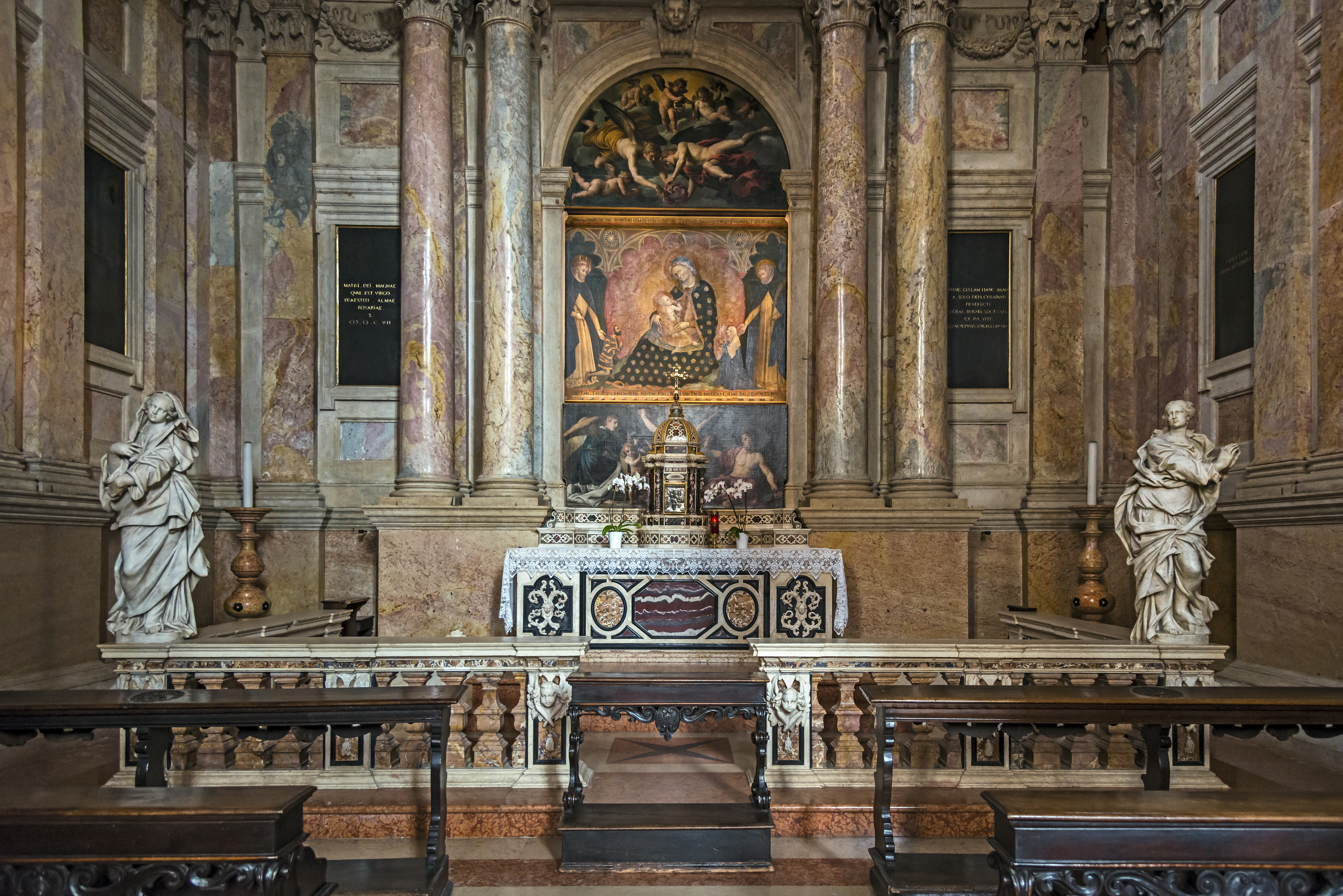
The chapel of the Rosary, the work of Domenico Curtoni

In this century, as in the previous one, many churches were endowed with valuable chapels; among the most notable, in addition to the one already mentioned in the church of San Bernardino, is the so-called Chapel of the Rosary, located along the left aisle of the basilica of Santa Anastasia, the work of Domenico Curtoni, nephew and pupil of Sanmicheli. The work was carried out between 1585 and 1596 through donations collected by the confraternity based there, which wanted this work to celebrate the 1571 victory at Lepanto in which the city of Verona had participated with three companies of soldiers. The chapel shows itself as the first monument of a new style, by then of the 17th century, whose completion with the addition of frescoes, canvases, statues and colored marble to form a unified work of art, had to take several more years.

=== 17th century: between classicist tradition and baroque renewal ===
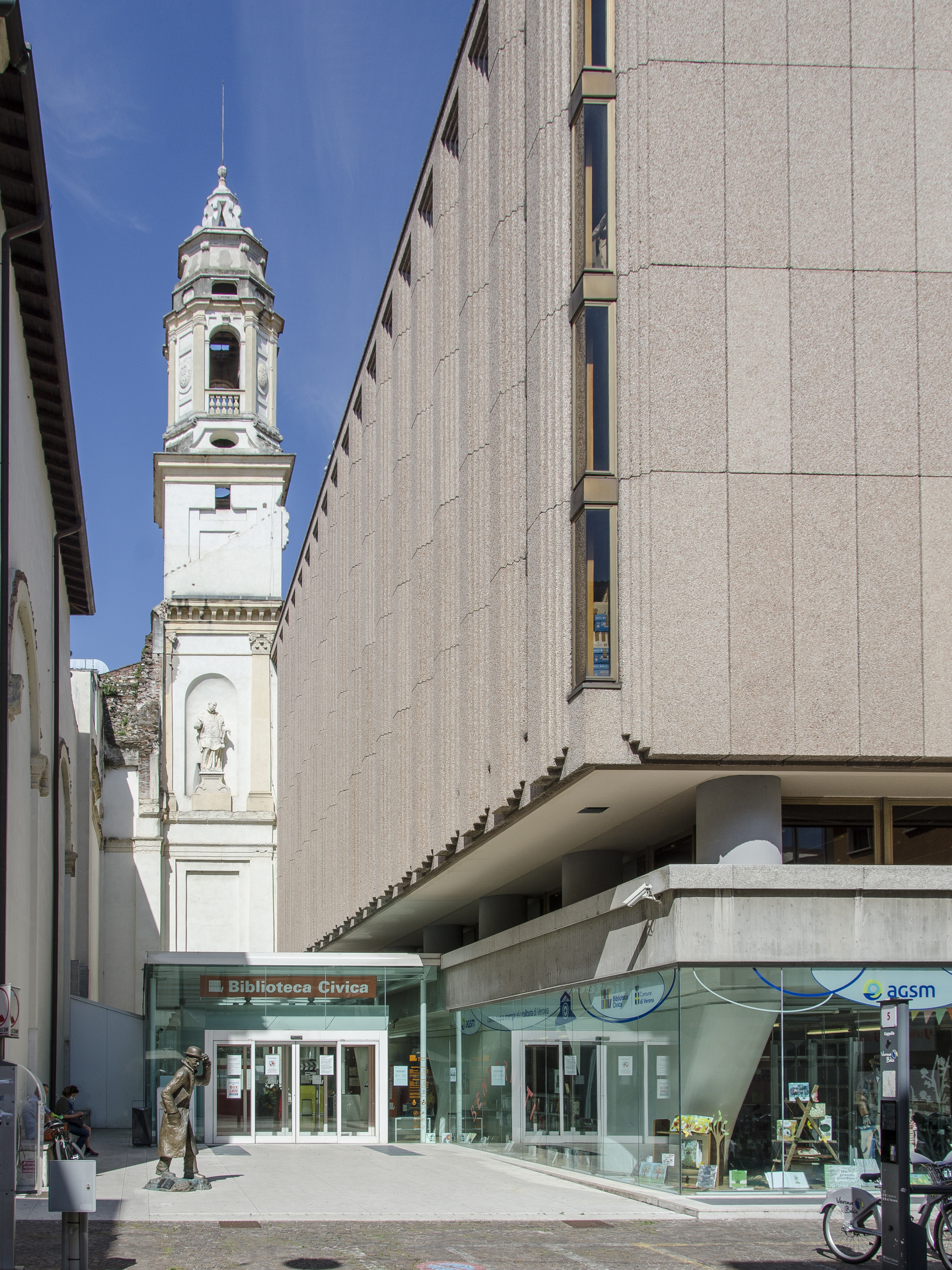
The bell tower of the church of San Sebastiano, the only element that survived World War II

In the years between the 16th and 17th centuries, new religious orders arose, including the Jesuits, the Theatines and the Capuchins, who also settled in Verona during the same period, where they built new churches and convents alongside existing ones. Meanwhile, the provisions of the Instructiones fabricae drawn up in 1577 by St. Charles Borromeo, archbishop of Milan, were introduced into the diocese: this was the only Counter-Reformation treatise aimed at applying the decrees of the Council of Trent in architecture, thus incorporating a major disciplinary arrangement of iconography and religious architecture, artistic catechesis and Counter-Reformation figurative precepts. These provisions, which would constitute the Church's code for sacred art for centuries, were probably introduced in Verona while Borromeo was still alive, as he had the influential Veronese clergyman Nicolò Ormaneto as his vicar-general and collaborator and the Bishop of Verona Agostino Valier as his friend.

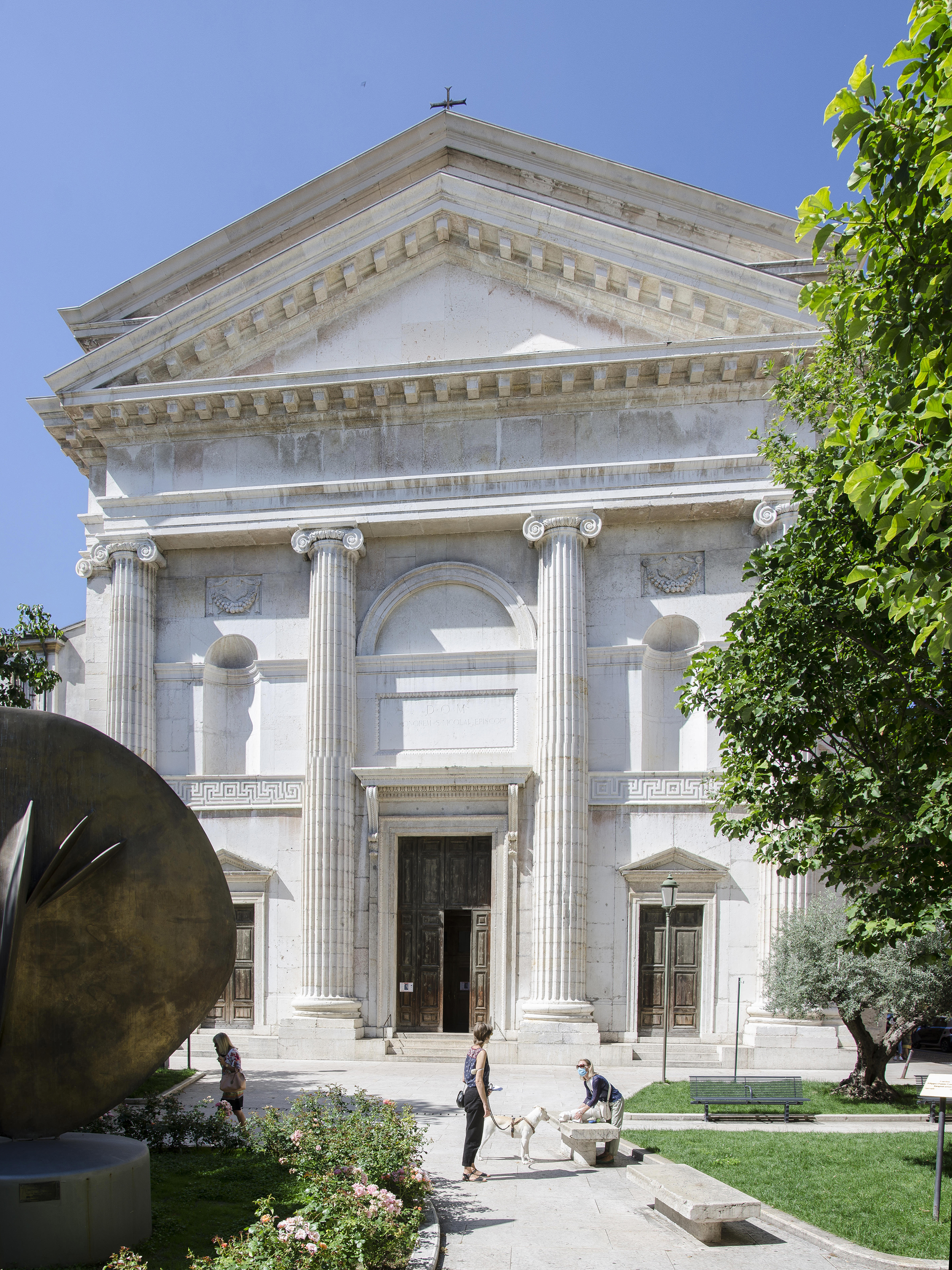
The façade, originally of the church of San Sebastiano, was dismantled after the war and reassembled in front of another 17th-century building, the church of San Nicolò all'Arena

In addition, Cardinal and Bishop Valier introduced the Jesuits to Verona in 1577, who the following year already managed to open schools in some buildings along Via Cappello, obtained through a decree later confirmed in 1580 by Pope Gregory XIII. In 1591 they finally managed to build their temple, the church of San Sebastiano, however in 1606 they were forced to leave Verona because of an interdict that affected the Republic of Venice, and they could only return in 1656, when they completed the construction of the complex. Subsequently, the façade, which had already been started, was finished: it was characterized by an impeccable classical symmetry, which did not let one imagine the opposite Baroque style used in the interior spaces. Of this church building, which was bombed and almost razed to the ground during World War II, only two elements survive, the bell tower and the façade. The belfry was the only element that managed to save itself in its entirety, so it still towers in the middle of the historic center of Verona with its forty-foot height, next to the civic library: on the belfry cell it preserves the emblem of the Jesuits, namely the symbol "JHS" surmounted by a cross with the three nails of the passion, while along the shaft is the large statue of St. Ignatius of Loyola, founder of the Order. The facade, on the other hand, was severely damaged, so it was dismantled and relocated to the main elevation of the church of San Nicolò all'Arena, which had remained unfinished since the 17th century. It is distinguished by the four fluted Ionic columns of the giant order that support the tympanum, dividing the elevation into three vertical bands: the central one, where the main entrance portal opens, and the two side ones, which feature two smaller portals surmounted by two pediments, and above them niches surmounted in turn by small panels decorated with classical festoons.

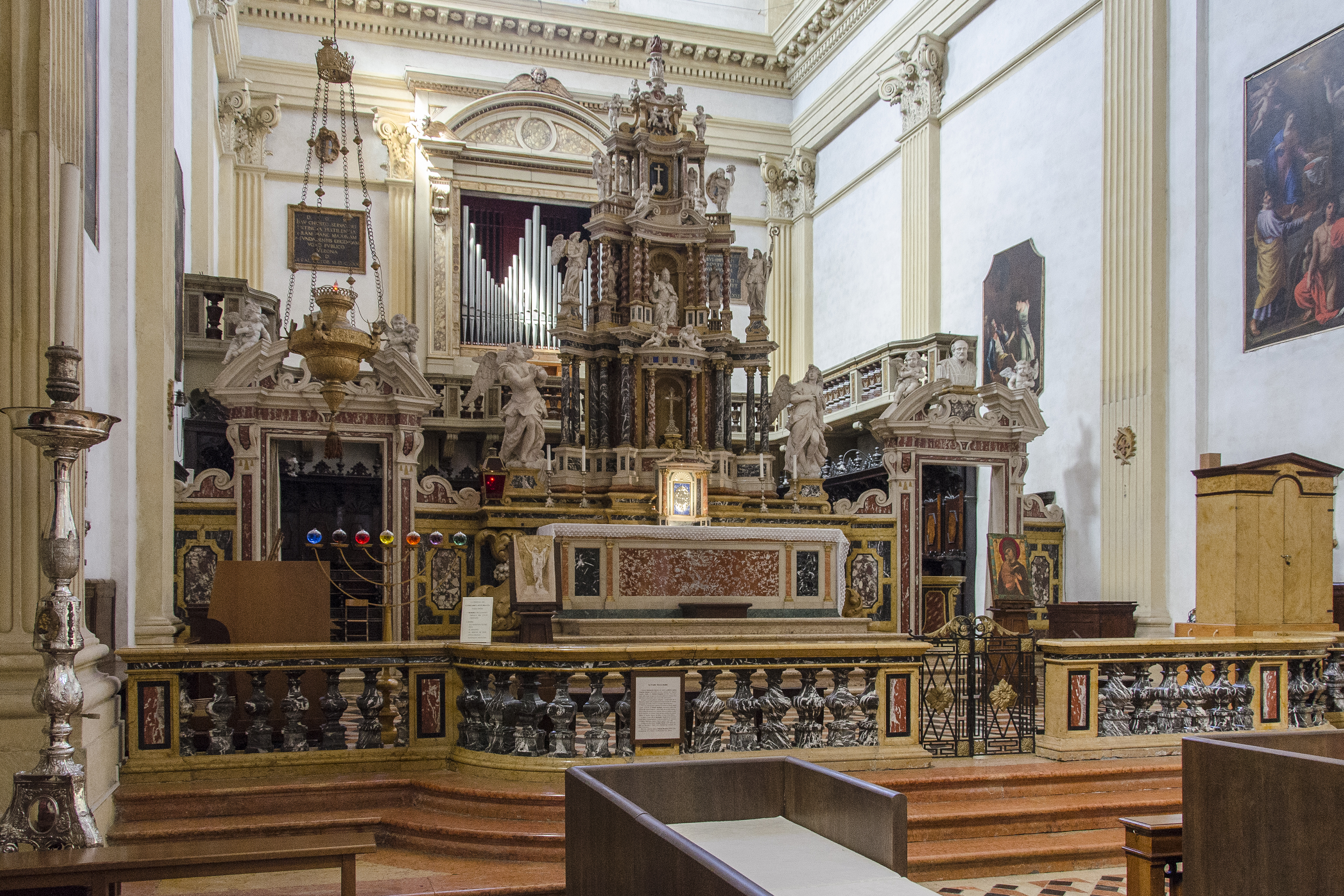
The presbytery area of the church of San Nicolò all'Arena, with the high altar by Guarino Guarini

In 1602 Valier gave the church of San Nicolò all'Arena as a concession to the Theatines, which was confirmed the following year by Pope Clement VIII. The latter settled there in 1622, and only in 1627 did work begin on the renovation of the entire church building, which was completed rather quickly and consecrated in 1697. This is one of the few examples of the Veronese Baroque period, the design of which is due to the architect Lelio Pellesina and the direction of the work to his son Vincenzo; it traces the Counter-Reformation scheme of a single nave with a wide transept and side chapels; however, even in this work, perhaps also due to the failure to build the dome that would have given it more breadth and theatricality, an architectural and decorative style related to classical schemes is shown, with an interior space elegantly decorated by Corinthian pilasters and seventeen niches in the walls where various statues find their place, except in the design of the high altar by Guarino Guarini, an object endowed with a powerful Baroque soul characterized by a tabernacle moved and articulated by a superimposition of columns in which the frontal view is substantially annulled. The facade was placed only after World War II, when the remains of the main elevation of the church of San Sebastiano were reused and reintegrated with the missing parts, thus saving a part of the monument that was destined to disappear.

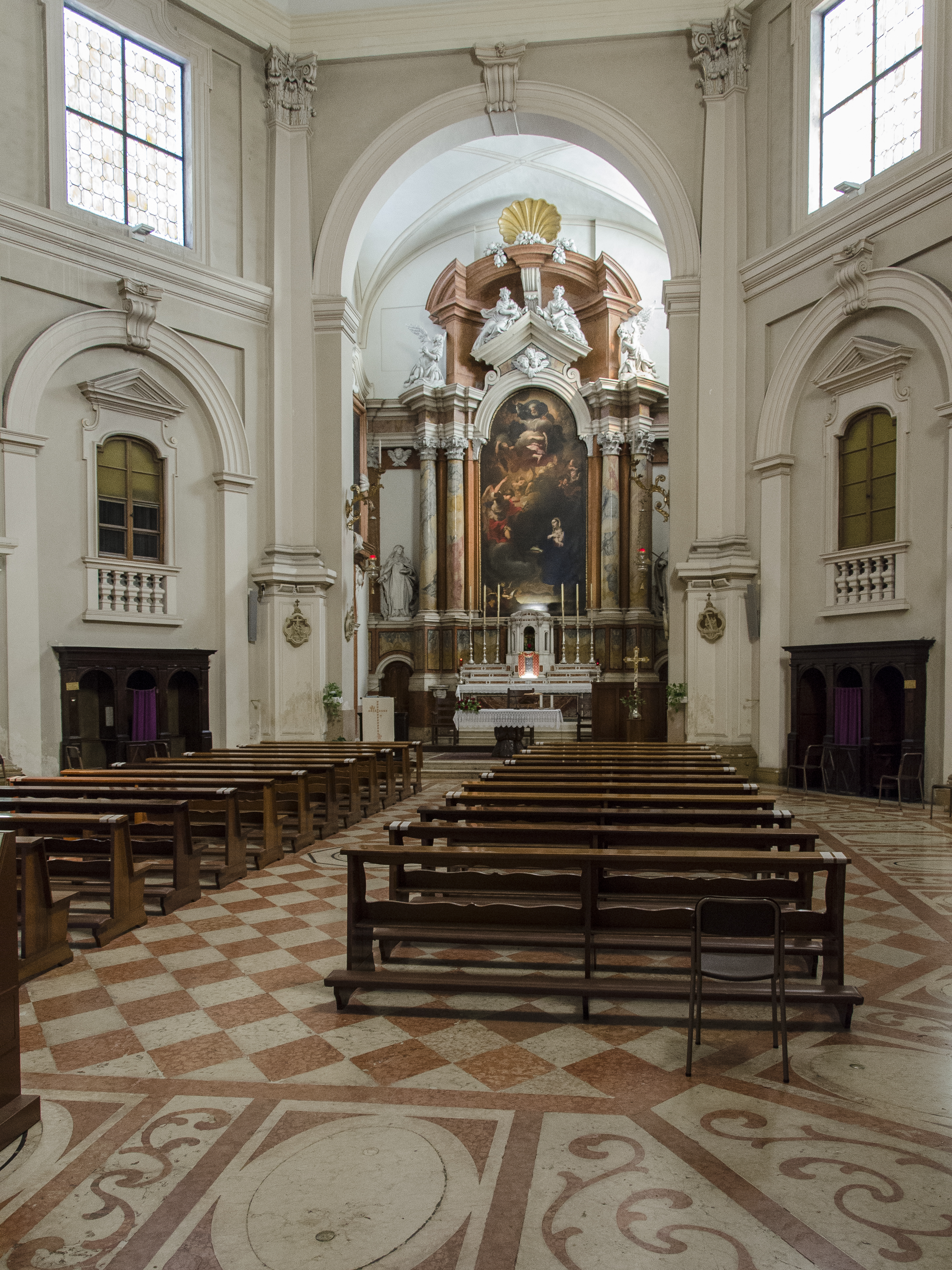
The church of the Scalzi with the baroque altar by Giuseppe Pozzo

Another Baroque church is Santa Teresa degli Scalzi, built by the Carmelites starting in 1666, but work on it continued so slowly that the facade was completed almost a century later. The building, designed by Giuseppe Pozzo, brother of the more famous architect Andrea, has a central and more precisely octagonal plan, with the hall covered by a flat ceiling supported by a strongly projecting corbelled cornice. Inside there are three rectangular chapels where complex and articulated altars are placed, of which the high altar, also by Giuseppe Pozzo, recalls the one designed by Guarini for the church of San Nicolò all'Arena.

Another interesting intervention was the construction of the churchyard of the church of Santi Nazaro e Celso by means of an elliptical enclosure designed in 1688 by architect Antonio Saletti. The churchyard is accessed through an elaborate entrance portal consisting of coupled columns on whose shafts draperies are tied, according to the style of the time, and on which the tympanum stands; along the inner elevation of the enclosure are several niches that may have housed statues, although there is no evidence of their past presence.

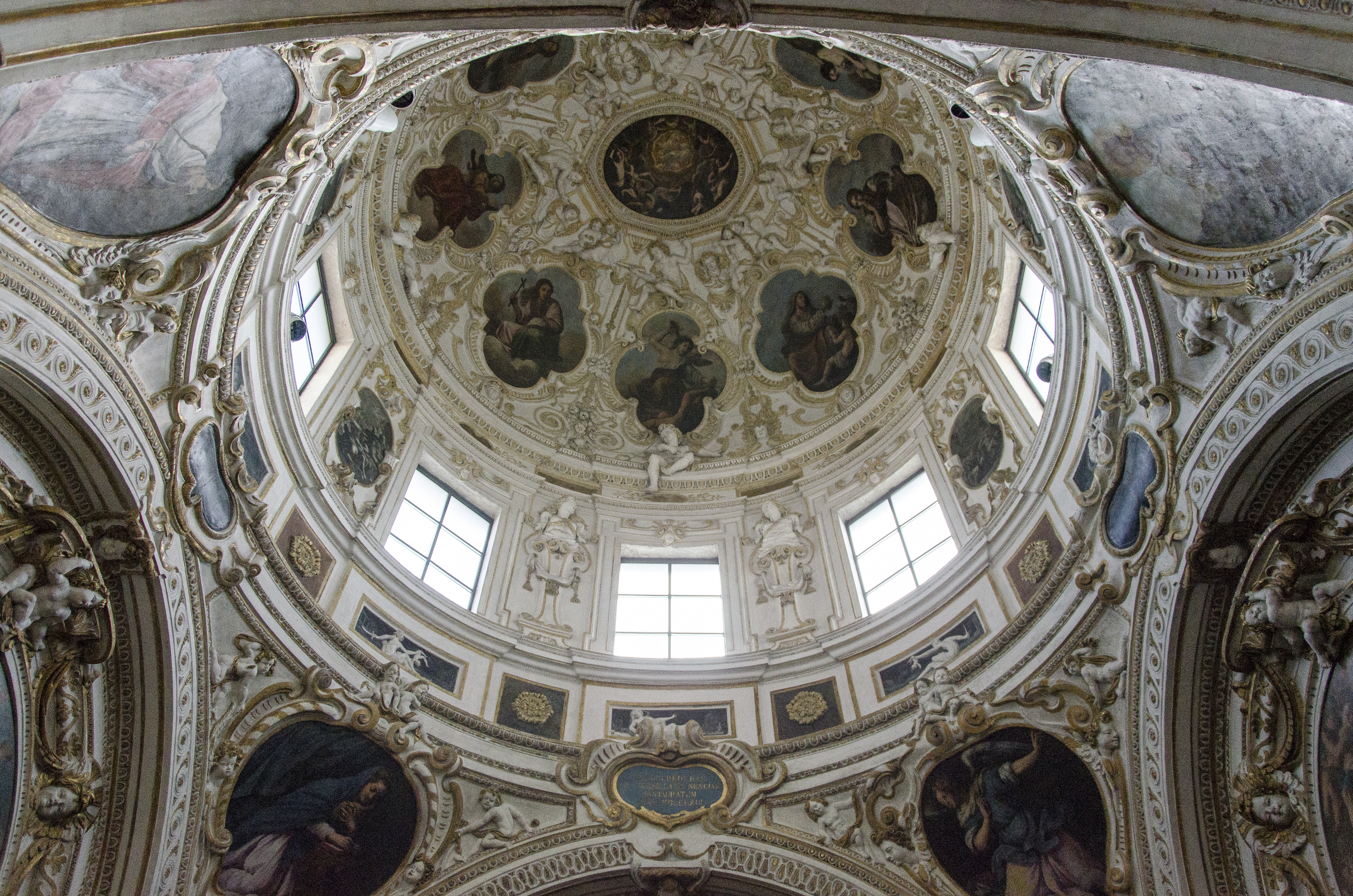
The dome of the Varalli Chapel in St. Stephen's Church

Even in this century, private chapels continued to be built within churches, endowed with spatial and figurative autonomy from the temples themselves; the two most important examples are the Varalli Chapel in the church of Santo Stefano and the Chapel of the Madonna in that of San Fermo Maggiore. The former was built between 1618 and 1621, designed as a parallelepiped structure surmounted by a windowed cylinder, the interior of which is finely decorated with mannerist stuccoes reminiscent of those in the dome of the church of the Inviolata in Riva del Garda and the basilica of Santa Maria delle Grazie in Brescia. Between 1610 and 1630, on the other hand, the chapel of the Madonna in the church of San Fermo was transformed, most likely to a design by Domenico Curtoni, and covered with a new architectural facing. The decoration is reminiscent of that of the chapel of the Rosary in the basilica of St. Anastasia, by the same author: this one too is covered with colored marbles, although only in the lower part, and these reproduce flat aedicules in the center of the side walls, while along the main elevation stands the high altar, of a similar type to the one present in St. Anastasia, with a tympanum supported by slightly protruding columns, but simplified.

In the same period there were numerous other interventions, some lost, such as the church of San Fermo Minore, rebuilt in 1626 to a design by Lelio Pellesina, and others still present, such as the transformation in 1617 of the church of San Benedetto al Monte, which lost its original ancient features, and the modernization started in 1656 of the church of San Luca.

=== 18th century: rigorist and neoclassical trends ===
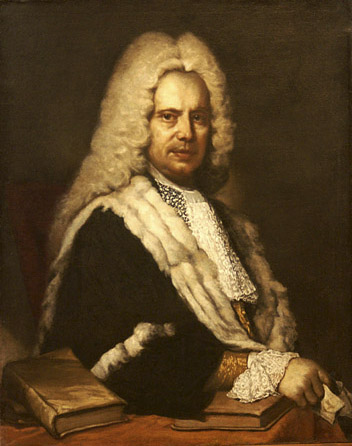
Portrait of Scipione Maffei, distinguished humanist who influenced the cultural climate of 18th-century Verona

After the great building ventures of the churches of San Sebastiano and San Nicolò all'Arena in the 17th century, there were no longer the necessary conditions in Verona to give birth to new ambitious projects of religious buildings, which was not only due to the changed conditions of the religious order, particularly with the fading of the Counter-Reformation fervor, but also economic and social ones. Moreover, with the consolidated presence of the large church systems built between the 12th and 13th centuries, the moment of greatest religious building intensity in the city, and with the renovations carried out between the 15th and 17th centuries, the urban fabric of the city could now be said to be substantially saturated with religious architecture: in 1757 there were as many as 130 sacred buildings recorded. Of these, during the 18th century only about fifteen were affected by upgrading or renovation, and few were significant. In addition to this, several episodes led to the loss of a good part of these eighteenth-century transformations: the Napoleonic suppressions, the aerial bombardments of World War II, and some speculative interventions in the immediate postwar period, such as the demolition of the oratory of San Giacomo Maggiore, by Alessandro Pompei, in 1956.

However, interventions in religious buildings of the eighteenth century in Verona were not of little value; the Enlightenment trends spread in the local culture by the humanist Scipione Maffei found wide resonance in the sphere of architecture, with efforts to re-establish classical models, which had never been completely abandoned in Verona due to the strong Sanmichelian tradition. Great efforts in this area were made by Alessandro Pompei, Maffei's friend and pupil, who sharply criticized Baroque poetics and in 1735 published Michel Sanmicheli's treatise Li cinque ordini d'architettura civile, anticipating the themes of neoclassical architecture. The architects Adriano Cristofali, Girolamo Del Pozzo, Luigi Trezza and, in the next century, Bartolomeo Giuliari, Giuseppe Barbieri and Francesco Ronzani followed this trend, especially in civil construction.

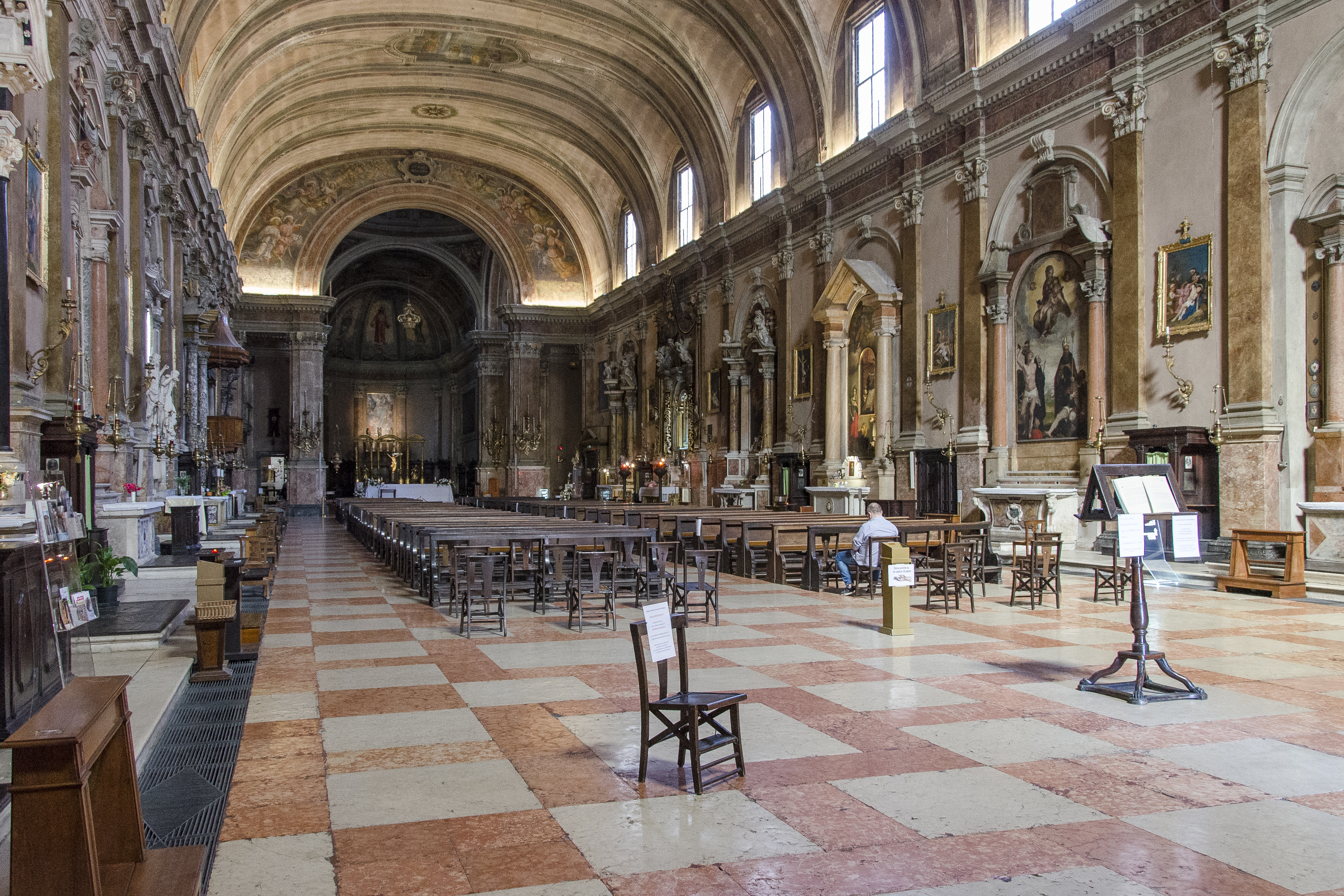
The interior of the church of St. Euphemia, renovated in Baroque forms since 1739

Before the rise of Enlightenment and neoclassical trends, however, there were other notable late Baroque episodes at the beginning of the century. In 1739 for example, the small church of San Matteo, located near Porta Borsari, was rebuilt, from the work of which resulted a building of graceful proportions and elegant decoration. The interiors of the aforementioned church of San Luca and the church of Santa Maria del Paradiso, which was completed in the 19th century with the construction of the neoclassical facade, were then completed. Then, among the most important interventions were those for the transformation of the church of St. Euphemia, whose Gothic interiors were reduced to a single hall in Baroque style, although later modifications isolated the Baroque insertions of altars and added more neutral decorations.

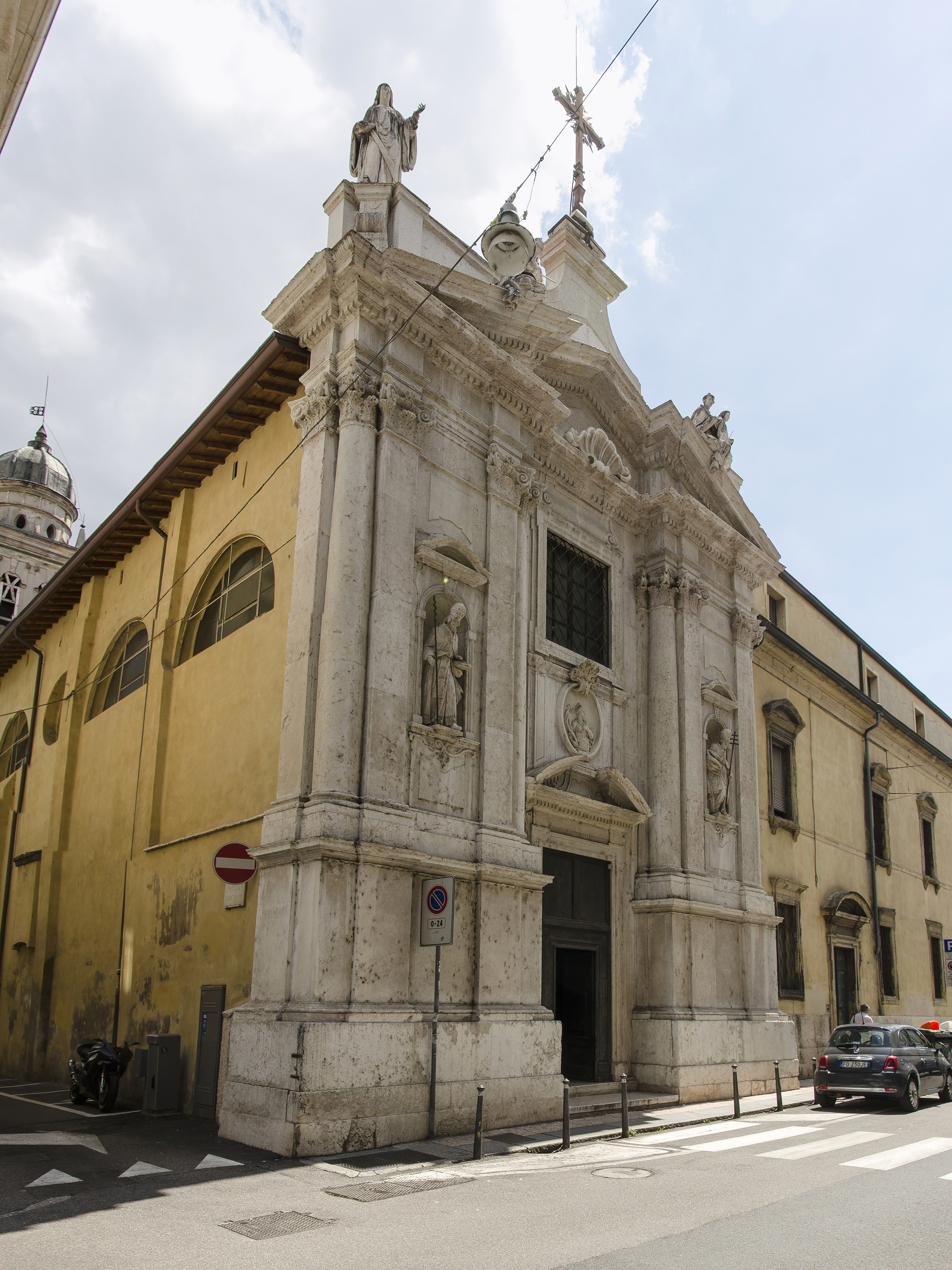
The church of Santa Caterina alla Ruota, the work of Giuseppe Montanari

Another interesting intervention that stands out for its late Baroque style is the church of Santa Caterina alla Ruota, the work of the Bolognese Giuseppe Montanari, a pupil of Ferdinando Bibiena and a supporter of the Bolognese Baroque school, as also evidenced by the design of the church's façade, which provoked several controversies and criticisms in an environment, the Veronese one, strongly respectful of local tradition. However, his solid professional skills enabled him to create an original architectural layout, with a strong chiaroscuro accent given by the retreat of the central band of the façade and endowed with an exuberant decorative plasticism typical of the last phase of the Baroque, given by the use of recessed corner columns and broken tympanums: these elements, well orchestrated, succeeded in creating an original urban setting.

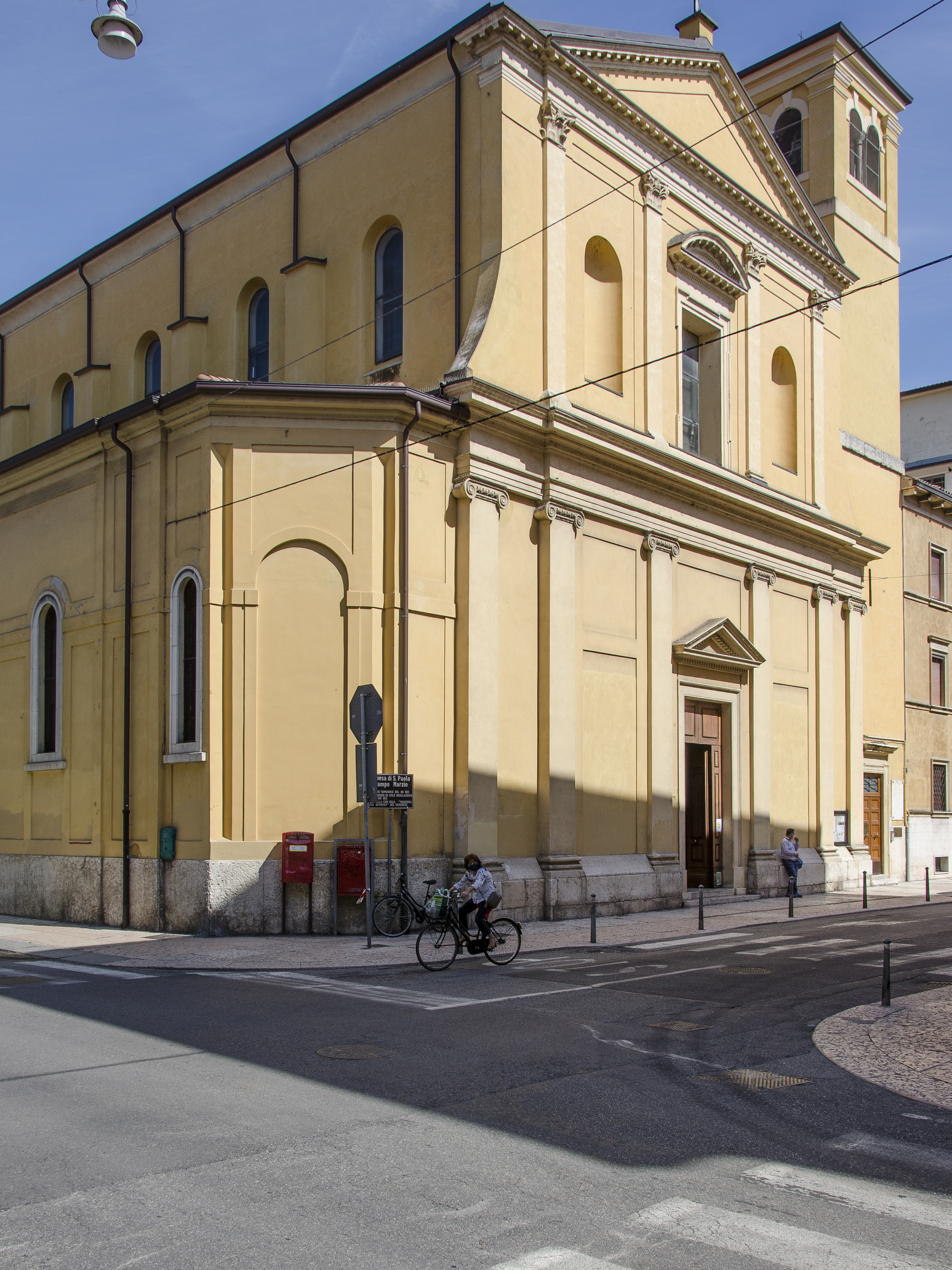
The neoclassical facade of St. Paul's Church, the work of Alessandro Pompei

A work of great classicist rigor, on the other hand, was the church of San Giacomo Maggiore, better known as San Giacometto, built in 1756 by Pompei but demolished after World War II; it was a small oratory with a square plan and two side niches where minor altars and a large rectangular presbytery ending in the choir were located. The interior was punctuated by lesenes of the Ionic order on which the entablature was set, resolved in the corner joints; finally, the space was covered by a cross-vaulted ceiling and four large arches overlying the building's axes. The façade, endowed with an essentiality reminiscent of classicist purism, was characterized by four Ionic pilasters supporting a wide pediment. The architect took up the same refined classicist composure in the 1763 design of the façade and interior of the nearby church of San Paolo in Campo Marzio, the execution of which was completed by others with few differences.

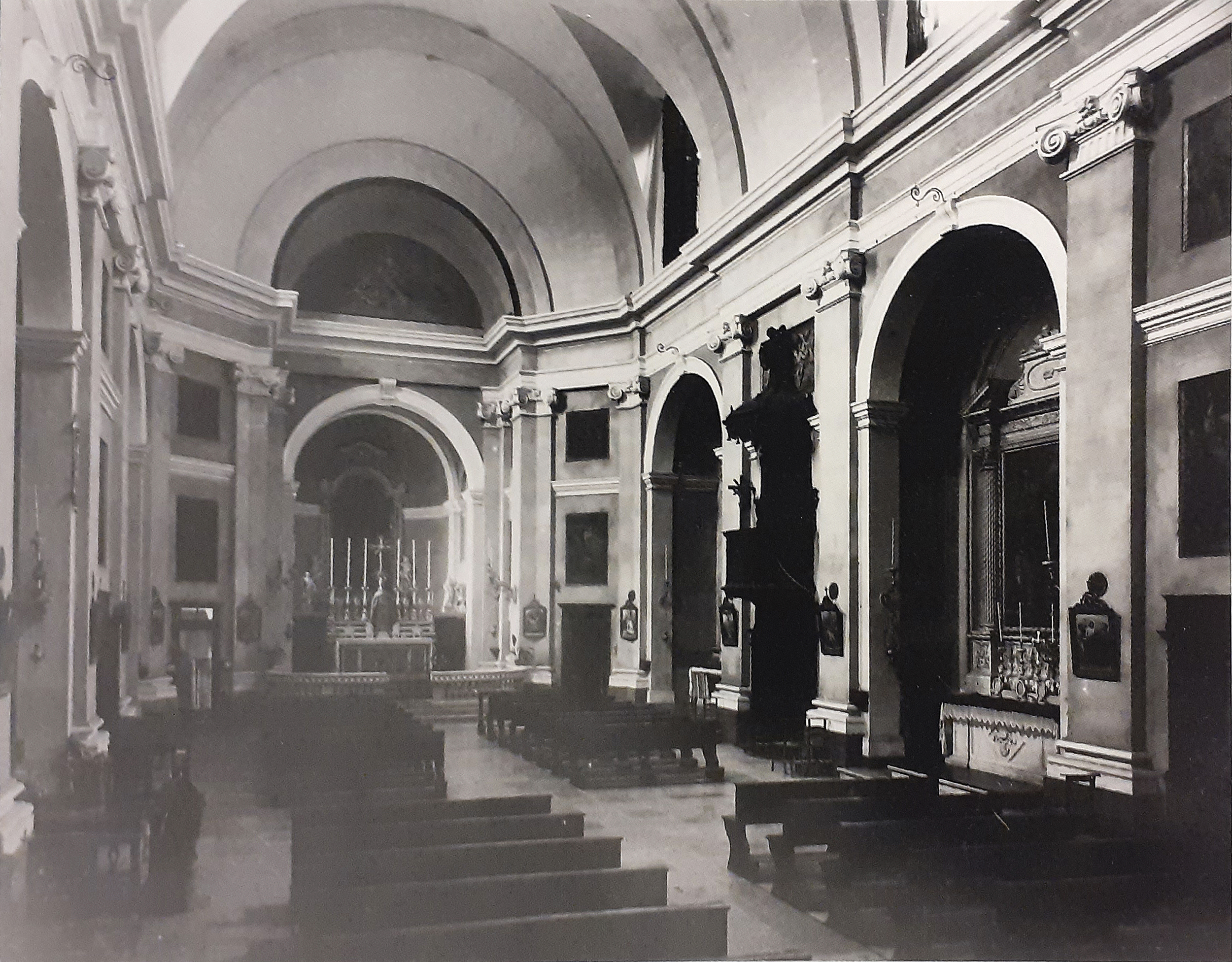
The interior of the church of San Pietro Incarnario before the twentieth-century transformations

A more prolific architect was Adriano Cristofali who, having returned from his Roman sojourn, worked in Verona on various religious and civil buildings. Among his works was, for example, the renovation of the church of San Pietro Incarnario, built on pre-existing buildings from the 10th and 15th centuries. In the building, which was already under construction in 1749, the original 15th-century apsidal area was retained at the request of the patron, thus grafting the new single-aisle plan with three chapels on each side, framed by a rhythmic truss of Ionic order; the corners of the interior space were eliminated by connecting the walls by means of oblique chamfers on which the rhythmic truss continued, thus giving greater spatial unity to the hall. The interior was covered by a lunetted barrel vault resting directly on the entablature, with large windows at the chapels. The façade, which, on the other hand, was not built to Cristofali's design, is characterized by a classical style but devoid of prominent elements.

Other religious buildings built by Cristofali included: the church of Santa Lucia, facing along Stradone Porta Palio, built between 1743 and 1765 but of which only the façade remains, albeit altered; the church of San Tomio, renovated by him around 1748 but transformed into a theater by Luigi Trezza after the Napoleonic suppressions, then transformed back into a place of worship in 1836 although now altered (however, the façade made by Montanari is preserved perfectly intact); the now lost dormitory of the monastery of San Salvatore in Corte Regia, admired by contemporaries and considered unparalleled in all of Italy.

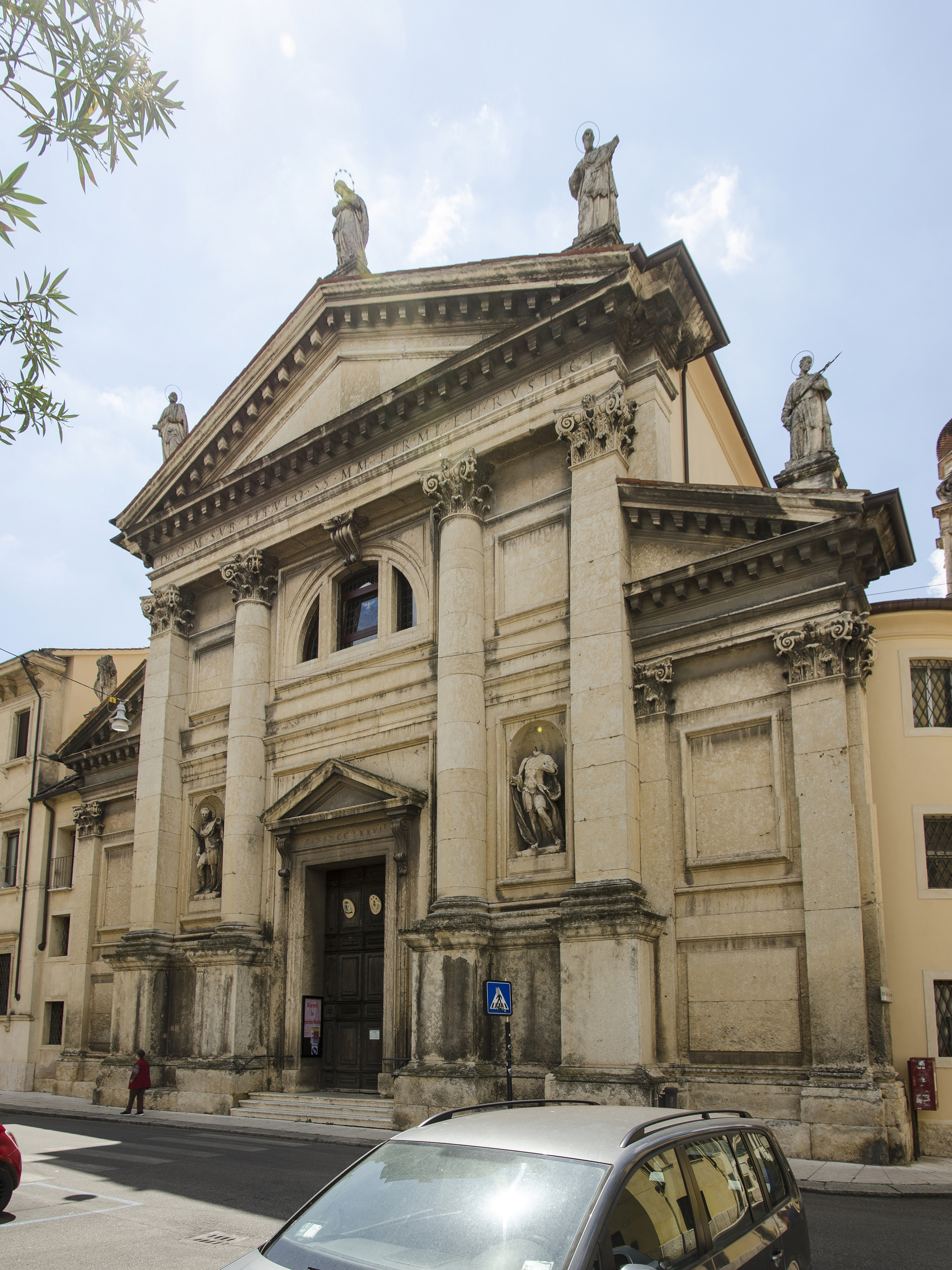
The church of San Fermo Minore di Brà by Andrea Camerata

The most significant episode in Veronese neoclassical architecture was probably the construction of the church of San Fermo Minore di Brà, although it was an intervention, somewhat like Montanari's at Santa Caterina alla Ruota, foreign to the city's architectural culture. The previous oratory was considered by the patrons to be too uncomfortable and cramped, so they opted for a radical renovation of the structure, the design of which was given to Michelangelo Castellazzi. He was soon replaced by the Venetian architect Andrea Camerata who, at a time when there had been a revival of Andrea Palladio's architecture in the Veneto, proposed, in a city that had never been sensitive to the style of the infamous Renaissance architect from Vicenza, a design that evidently referred to some of his Venetian churches. In particular, Camerata recovered the facade of the basilica of San Giorgio Maggiore and drew some variations from the basilica of the Redeemer and the church of San Francesco della Vigna. Although he drew on earlier models, demonstrating little compositional autonomy, he nevertheless succeeded in proposing for the new elevation an elegant result with well-thought-out proportional relationships. Less fortunate was the design of the plan layout, since longitudinally the usable space was limited by the alley behind, where the apse of the choir could not protrude: he could thus devise a single-aisle plan with only two chapels on each side, losing the tension that is characteristic of the Church of the Redeemer, from which he seems to have been inspired also in the decorative schemes.

With this century the religious building period essentially ended for the city intra moenia, which in the 19th century continued only with restoration work involving some of the oldest church buildings. On the other hand, the building of new churches did not end in the neighborhoods that began to emerge outside the walls and in the hamlets that were later incorporated into the territory of the Municipality of Verona.

== List of churches by district ==
The following is a list of the churches present in Verona, divided between those intra moenia and extra moenia, that is, between those located within the magistral enclosure, in the four districts of the Old Town, Veronetta, Cittadella and San Zeno, and those located outside it.

=== Old Town ===
- Cathedral of Verona, cathedral church of the diocese of Verona
- Basilica of Saint Anastasia
- Baptistery of San Giovanni in Fonte
- Church of the Holy Apostles
- Church of San Benedetto al Monte
- Church of Saint Euphemia
- Church of San Fermo Maggiore
- Church of San Fermo Minore, demolished in the 19th century
- Church of San Fermo Minore di Brà
- Church of San Giovanni in Foro
- Church of San Lorenzo
- Church of Santa Maria Antica
- Church of Santa Maria in Chiavica, deconsecrated
- Church of Santa Maria Consolatrice, Waldensian evangelical place of worship
- Church of Santa Maria della Scala
- Church of San Matteo, deconsecrated in the Napoleonic era
- Church of San Nicolò all'Arena
- Church of San Pietro Incarnario
- Church of San Pietro Martire, deconsecrated in the Napoleonic era
- Church of San Salvatore Vecchio, Russian Orthodox place of worship
- Church of St. Sebastian, which was destroyed during World War II
- Church of Saints Teuteria and Tosca
- Church of San Tomio

=== Veronetta ===
- Church of Santa Chiara, deconsecrated in the Napoleonic era and again in the 20th century
- Church of San Giorgio in Braida
- Church of San Giovanni in Valle
- Church of the Madonna del Terraglio
- Church of Santa Maria del Paradiso
- Church of Santa Maria in Organo
- Church of Saints Nazaro and Celso
- Church of St. Paul
- Church of St. Peter in Castello, demolished in the 19th century
- Church of St. Peter Martyr
- Church of Saints Siro and Libera
- Church of St. Stephen
- Church of San Tomaso Cantuariense
- Church of Santa Toscana

=== San Zeno ===
- Basilica of San Zeno
- Church of San Bernardino
- Church of San Procolo
- Church of San Zeno in Oratorio

=== Cittadella ===
- Church of Santa Caterina alla Ruota
- Church of St. Dominic, evangelical Lutheran place of worship
- Church of St. Luke
- Church of the Scalzi
- Church of the Holy Trinity in Monte Oliveto

=== Extra moenia ===
- Church of St. Andrew the Apostle
- Church of St. Anthony Abbot
- Church of Saints Philip and James
- Church of St. Francis of Assisi
- Church of St. John the Baptist
- Church of St. John in Sacco, demolished in the sixteenth century
- Church of St. Joseph Outside the Walls
- Church of Santa Lucia Extra
- Church of the Madonna di Campagna
- Church of Santa Maria Assunta
- Church of San Martino Vescovo
- Church of Our Lady of Lourdes
- Church of St. Maximus
- Church of St. Michael the Archangel
- Church of Saints Peter and Paul
- Church of San Rocchetto
- Church of St. Rocco
- Church of St. Theresa of the Child Jesus
- Votive Temple

== See also ==
- Verona
- Monuments of Verona
- Roman Catholic Diocese of Verona

== Bibliography ==
- Giorgio Borelli, ed. (1980). Chiese e monasteri di Verona. Verona: Banca Popolare di Verona.
- Enzo Boschi; Alberto Comastri; Emanuela Guidoboni (December 2005). "The "exceptional" earthquake of 3 January 1117 in the Verona area (northern Italy): a critical time review and detection of two lost earthquakes (lower Germany and Tuscany)". Journal of Geophysical Research. 110. Washington: 84–124.
- Pierpaolo Brugnoli; Arturo Sandrini (1988). Architettura a Verona nell'età della Serenissima. Verona: Banca Popolare di Verona.
- Carlo Cipolla. Ricerche storiche intorno alla chiesa di Santa Anastasia in Verona.
- Paul Davies; David Hemsoll (2004). Michele Sanmicheli. Milano: Mondadori Electa.
- Lionello Puppi (1978). Ritratto di Verona: lineamenti di una storia urbanistica. Verona: Banca Popolare di Verona.
- Giovanni Solinas (1981). Storia di Verona. Verona: Centro RinasHarvtxt.
- Giuseppe Franco Viviani (2002). Chiese di Verona. Verona: Società cattolica di assicurazione.
