= Church of San Giovanni in Valle =

Church in Verona, Italy

- Chiesa di San Giovanni in Valle
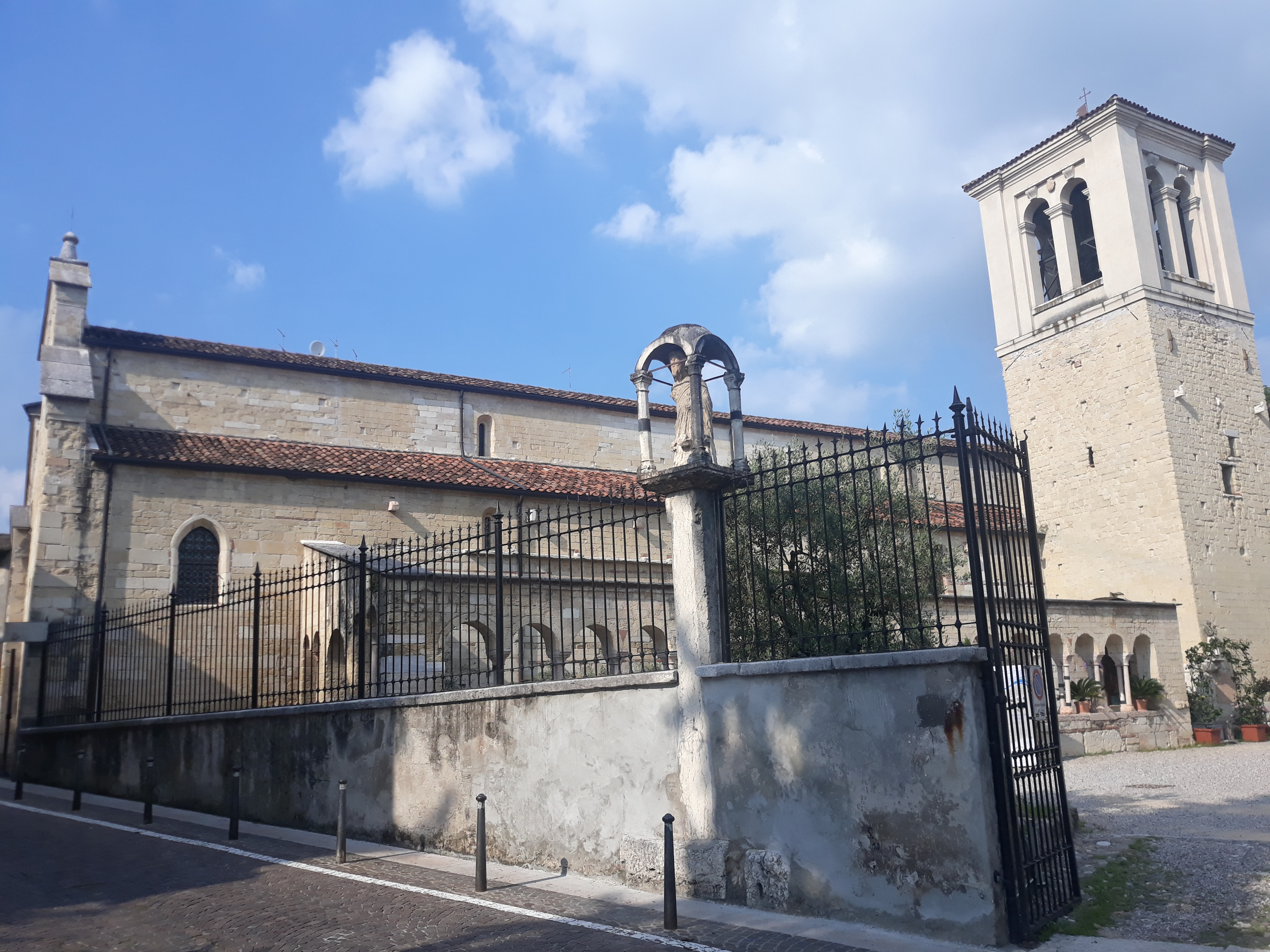
- Side view

- 45°26′48″N 11°00′20″E
- Location: Verona, Veneto, Italy
- Denomination: Catholic

History
- Dedication: John the Baptist
- Consecrated: 1164

Architecture
- Style: Romanesque
- Groundbreaking: 4th century (first building) and 1120 (reconstruction)
- Completed: 14th century

Administration
- Diocese: Roman Catholic Diocese of Verona

San Giovanni in Valle is a Romanesque-style, Catholic church located on the street of the same name in Verona, region of Veneto, Italy.

San Giovanni is one of the oldest churches in Verona, it arose on the site of a pagan necropolis and a Roman temple. Little or nothing is known about the early building, however some elements, such as its location in the area where the castrum of Theodoric the Great stood (in the vallum of the castle, hence the name), suggest that in the beginning it may have been the Arian cathedral of Verona, as opposed to the Catholic church of Santo Stefano. In any case, only part of the present crypt remains of this early church, as the rest of the building was severely damaged in the earthquake that struck Verona in 1117. As early as 1120 the reconstruction of what would later be the present building in the Romanesque style began, while in 1164 its consecration took place at the hands of the bishop of Verona Ognibene. During the Middle Ages a collegiate church of clerics also resided there. In 1300 it was decided to enlarge the hall of the building by lengthening the nave by one bay, the pre-existing narthex was then incorporated into the church and the facade rebuilt from scratch. During the following centuries the building did not undergo any other major transformations, however, it was deeply damaged during a World War II bombing raid; at the end of the conflict, therefore, it underwent extensive restoration.

The church building, which is one of the masterpieces of Veronese Romanesque style, is characterized by a basilica plan divided into three naves by the alternation of pillars and columns, while the vertical development is on three levels: a raised presbytery, the hall and the lower crypt. Of notable value are the elegant carved capitals placed to crown the columns. The walls, once entirely frescoed, now show only a few fragments of paintings ruined by time and moisture. In the crypt, next to the high altar, are kept two valuable sarcophagi: one dating from the 4th century features a bas-relief sculpture on three sides in two overlapping orders with stories from the Old and New Testament narrated and in which tradition holds the relics of the apostles Simon the Canaanite and Judas Thaddeus; the other, which is older (2nd or 3rd century), is a strigilated sarcophagus from the pagan period with depictions in the center of two spouses in a shell above a rural scene and with two figures of philosophers later transformed into Christian saints on either side.

The complex is completed by a bell tower, Romanesque in its lower part and of Renaissance style in its upper part, a cloister of which only one wing remains, and the rectory that was once the seat of the collegiate church and is now one of the oldest civil buildings to be found in the city.

== History ==
=== Origins ===
Findings in the area of terracotta funerary urns show that the church of San Giovanni in Valle stands in the area where there was once a pagan necropolis and perhaps also a small Roman temple dedicated to the Sun God. There is no precise documentary or archaeological information about when the first church dedicated to John the Baptist was built: according to the historian Grancelli this was in the early Christian period, probably around the beginning of the fourth century, when the church of Santo Stefano and the church of St. Peter in Castello (no longer extant today) were also built; the historian Guido Barbetta, on the other hand, believes that this dating should be delayed by a few decades, towards the end of the century. However, there are doubts about both of these theories due to the absence of irrefutable evidence.

Due to the fact that it stands not far from the castrum erected by Theodoric the Great and also later used by the Lombards, many believe that this may have been an Arian cathedral, as opposed to the aforementioned church of Santo Stefano, which may have been the Catholic one. In addition, the Arian Lombards were very devoted to St. John, and at the time of the schism of the three chapters (between the 6th and 7th centuries) there was a strong presence of the Arian heresy in Verona, and therefore it is very likely that there was a cathedral dedicated to their beliefs.

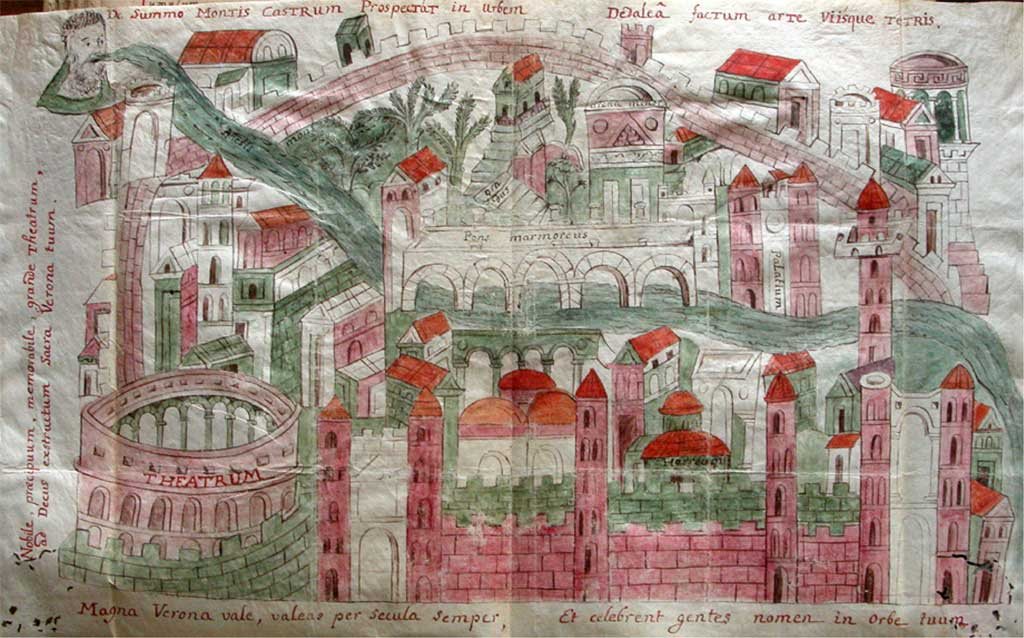
Raterian iconography, mid-10th century, the oldest depiction of the city of Verona. The church of San Giovanni in Valle can be seen in the upper right corner

According to this supposition, following the conversion of the Lombards to Catholicism at the end of the 7th century, the church of San Giovanni must have been consecrated to Christian orthodoxy, as is evidenced by its mention in the famous Versus de Verona, a poem describing Verona and its churches in the early Middle Ages. Further confirmation of this comes from a document by Bishop Rotaldo dating from 813, at the time of the reign of Pepin of Italy, in which it is attested that San Giovanni was a Christian parish church equipped with a baptismal font. Bishop Rotaldo again received a privilege from Emperor Louis the Pious on June 13, 820, in which the church of San Giovanni in Valle was described as a simple oratorium, showing that it had lost its importance.

=== From the Romanesque-style reconstruction to the present ===
In any case, this primitive church was largely destroyed as a result of the devastating earthquake of 1117; only a part of the crypt, which still exists today, was saved, presumably, and more precisely the front part supported by columns in addition to the apses. Reconstruction began in 1120, only three years after the earthquake, going on to create what would later become the present building, which was consecrated in 1164 by the bishop of Verona Ognibene. Regarding the architectural style of the reconstructed building, architectural historian Wart Arslan remarked that "with San Giovanni in Valle, Verona's Romanesque architecture shows that it has now elaborated a type that will be constant in its choicest maturity."

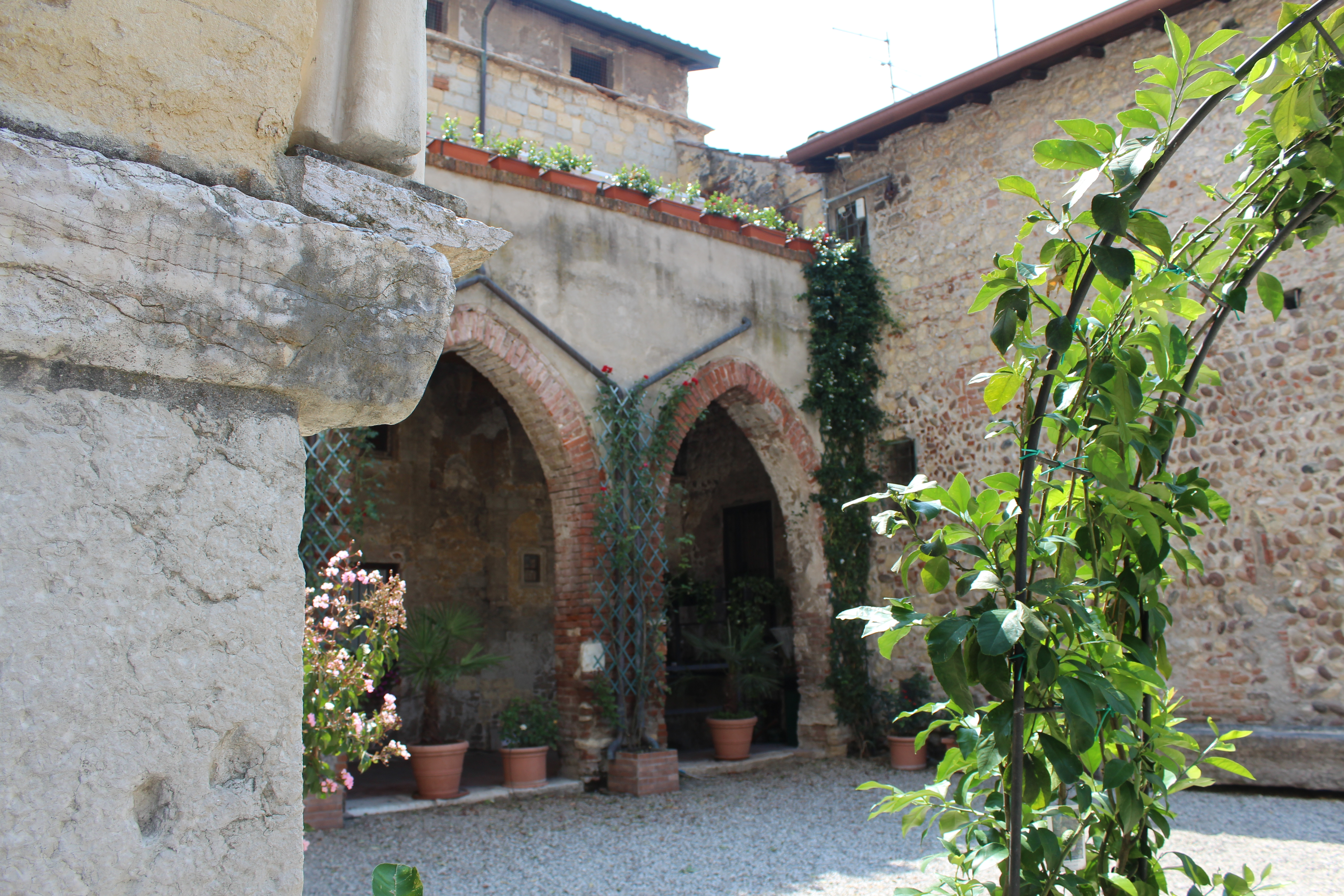
The rectory, which once housed the collegiate church that resided here, is now one of the oldest civic buildings in Verona (the Gothic arcade was added later)

From about 1205 it became a parish, and began to serve as a shelter for pilgrims, of which a first mention is dated to 1069. Although it was dependent on the canons of the cathedral it owned land in the monasteries of St. Nazaro e Celso and San Paolo. In a document dated 10 February 1114 a certain Bonvicino, presbyter of the church, received the lease of a house and some fields to be used for the hospice. In 1189 Bishop Adelardo Cattaneo granted an indulgence of forty days to anyone who would bear the expenses for the upkeep of the complex.

In 1204, when San Giovanni was a parish with a baptismal font, with the right to tithe, and a collegiate of clerics was associated with the church, a long dispute with the cathedral chapter began. It was then customary that once the clerics elected their own archpresbyter, he had to report to the cathedral; however, having elected a certain Augustine, they decided to reject this practice. The dispute was so severe that Pope Innocent III had to intervene. The ruling, which was moreover in favor of the canons, had to wait for 16 years. In a later deed of lease of 1292 it is reiterated that clerics and priests of San Giovanni lived a common life by eating at the same table. In 1392 the church was called a "monastery" because of the "semblance of monastic life" that was led here.

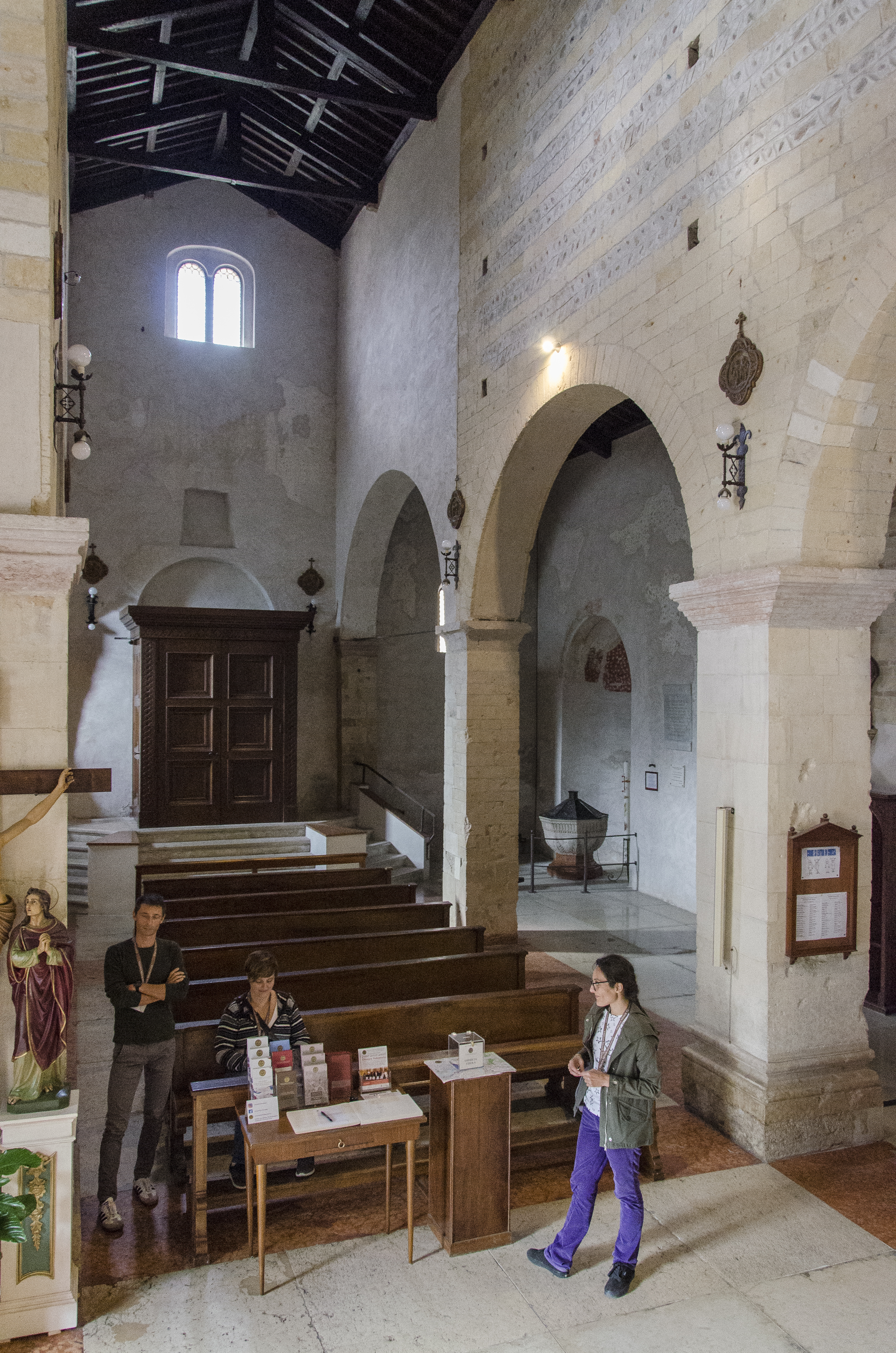
Inside the church one can easily see how a bay was added in the 1300s to enlarge the hall, due to the different surface treatment: the added part is plastered while the older part, from the 12th century, is made of exposed stone

In 1300 the Romanesque facade was rebuilt, setting it back from the previous one in order to increase the capacity of the church by lengthening the nave by about one bay and by incorporating the narthex. In 1395 what were believed to be the bodies of Saints Simon and Judas were found, and on April 13 of the same year solemn celebrations were held with the consecration of an altar dedicated to them.

Between the middle of the 18th century and the first decades of the 20th, the church changed its role in the diocese of Verona several times. In fact, in 1756, thanks to Pope Benedict XIV's constitution Regis pacifici vices, San Giovanni in Valle was freed from the authority of the canons of the cathedral to be subject directly to that of the bishop. On 18 December 1807 it momentarily ceased to be a parish to become a subsidiary of Santa Maria in Organo; however, in 1919 it became a parish again, with a plaque placed on the left side near the entrance recalling this circumstance.

During a World War II bombing on the night of 10 October 1944, the church of San Giovanni in Valle was hit and seriously damaged. A number of deaths and injuries were also reported among the population in the crypt, which was then used as an air raid shelter. Once the conflict ended, it was promptly restored: the occasion was also taken to restore the small Romanesque-style windows and to remove the larger windows dating back to the 17th century, and on 10 October 1945 Bishop Girolamo Cardinale was able to reconsecrate the high altar.

== Description ==
=== Exterior ===
The church of San Giovanni in Valle stands in the eastern part of the city of Verona, on the opposite bank of the Adige River from that on which the ancient center is located. It was possibly built within the vallum of the castle of Theodoric the Great, hence the name "in Valle." The building dates from the first half of the 13th century while the facade was rebuilt in 1300 following the decision to enlarge the interior. An example of typical Veronese Romanesque architecture, the building is placed with the usual, at the time, west-east orientation. In addition to the facade, the apses and in particular the north (left) apsidiole are of notable interest, while the side walls do not have any notable features. Complementing the complex are an ancient cloister, of which only a few rests remain, a bell tower built in different periods, and the rectory.

==== Facade ====
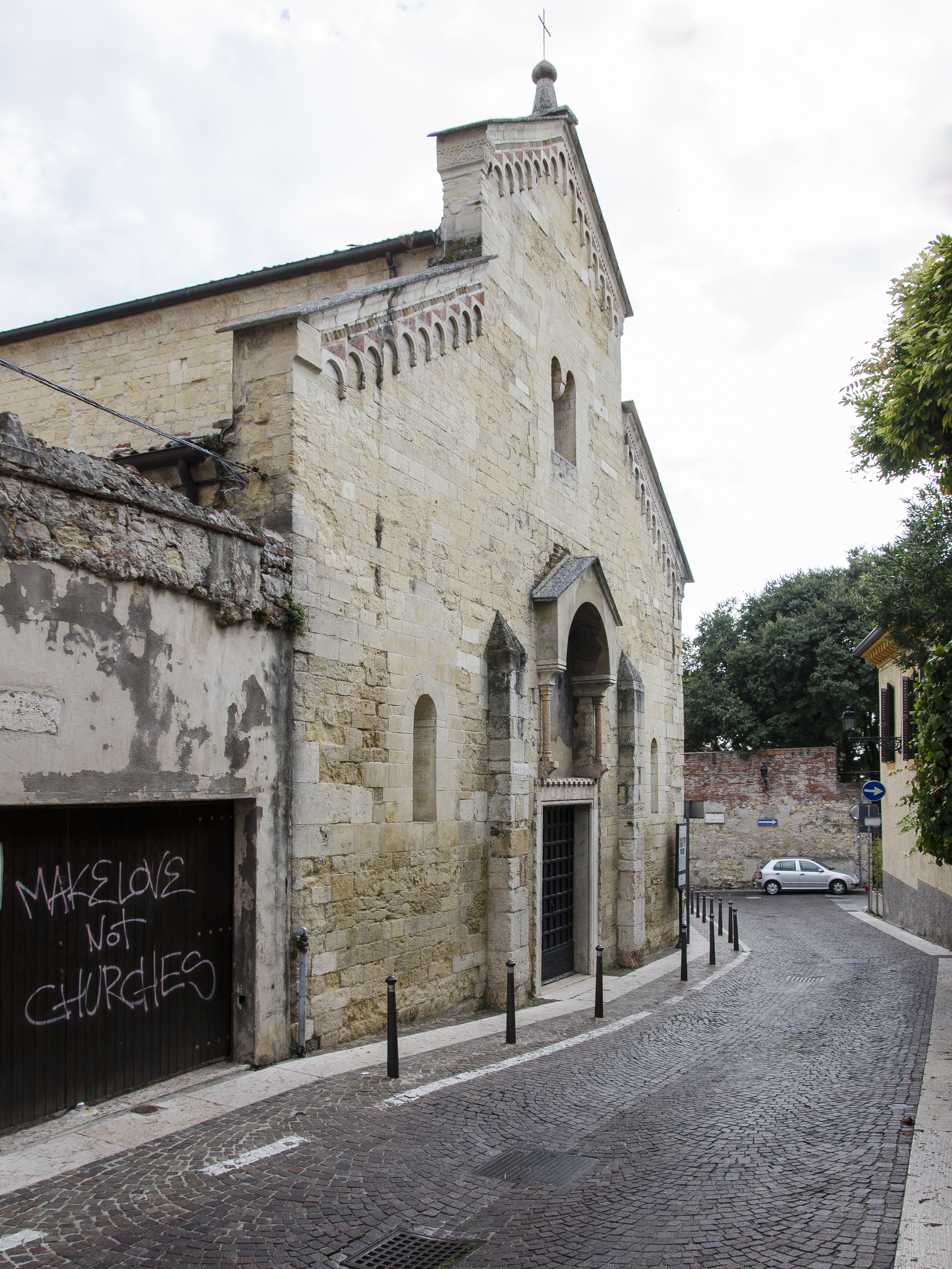
Church facade

To the west, the church of San Giovanni in Valle has a simple salient tripartite facade, made of medium-sized ashlars of tuff that alternate with blocks of maiolica at the highest part, a typical example of the Veronese Romanesque style reminiscent of the facades of the parish church of San Floriano (in Valpolicella), the church of San Severo (in Bardolino) and the abbey of San Pietro in Villanova (San Bonifacio).

The entrance portal opens in the center, enclosed in a Gothic frame of red dice marble, surmounted by a small hanging prothyrum resting on two small columns. The lunette underneath the prothyrum preserves remains of a fresco, depicting a Madonna seated on a throne with a baby Jesus on her knees attributed to Stefano da Verona. Also depicted next to the Madonna are, on the right, St. Bartholomew holding a book and, on the left, St. Anthony Abbot. The composition is completed by three medallions divided by a frieze, painted on the intrados of the prothyrum, inside of which are the figures of St. John the Baptist, the Paschal Lamb, and the Prophet Isaiah, all most likely made by the same author of the lunette.

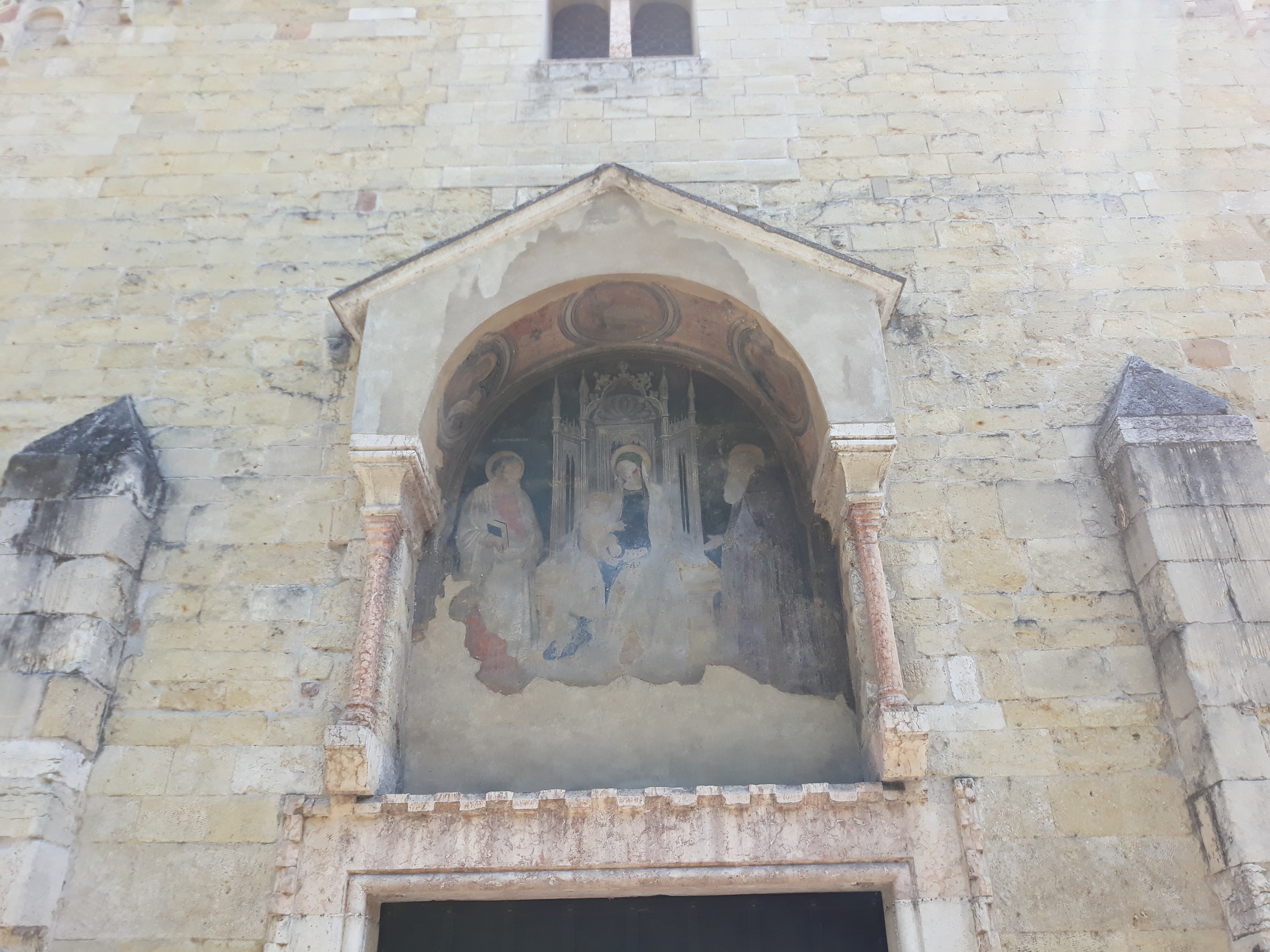
Detail of the prothyrum

The sun's rays hitting the facade reach the interior of the church through two Romanesque single-lancet windows that open on either side of the portal at the side aisles and from a mullioned window at the top center above the prothyrum: these openings still preserve the primitive illumination of the interior spaces, where a dim light creates a thick penumbra and a calm-looking environment. The attic is decorated by a fine frieze with saw-tooth rampant arches sheltered by large stone slabs placed to protect the overhangs.

Restored in the second half of the twentieth century with the removal of later additions, the facade visible today dates back to the fourteenth century, that is, to when it was decided to lengthen the church by one bay by incorporating the narthex, which was therefore lost in favor of the elevation still present today. In this regard Wart Arslan notes that "in the 14th century, with a respect for the ancient of which we do not have many examples, the church was lengthened, adding an additional bay while preserving the profile of the older facade, carefully restoring the crowning with arches to the new construction."

==== Apses ====
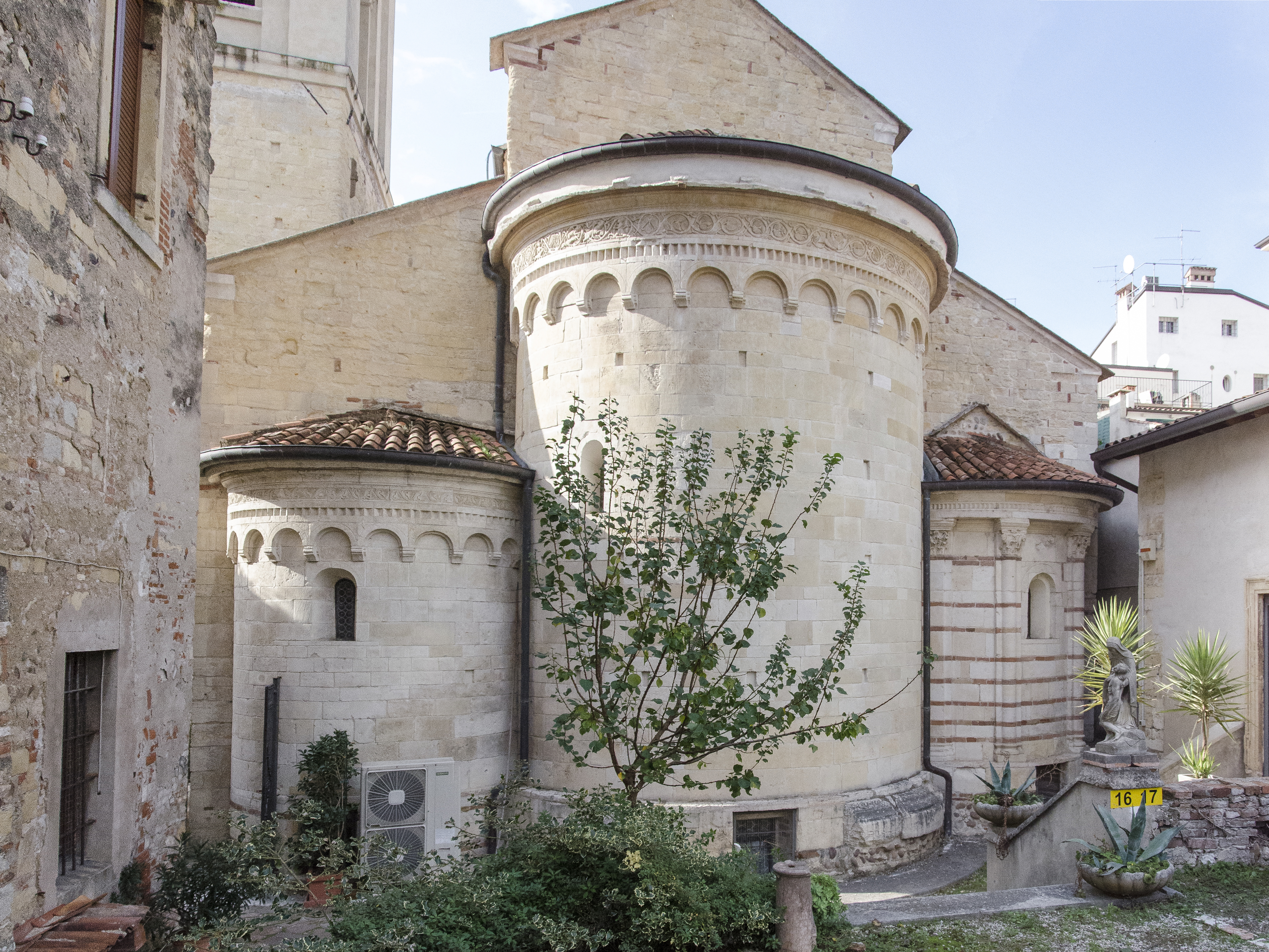
The three apses of the church

The church ends in the east with three semicircular apses placed at the three interior naves. The northernmost one, at the close of the left aisle, differs from the others in its more complex and elegant construction, suggesting that this "small masterpiece of Veronese architecture from 1120" is the oldest of the three by a few years. Its wall is composed of a horizontal alternation of large blocks of tuff alternating with thin rows of terracotta, a construction scheme very reminiscent of that of the apse of the Santi Apostoli church in Verona, while vertically it is divided by four lesenes all ending in Corinthian-style capitals that seem to support a frieze "strongly projecting and emphasized by a saw-tooth band." Among the capitals, the most elaborate is the second one (starting from the central apse) in which two lions are depicted between acanthus leaves.

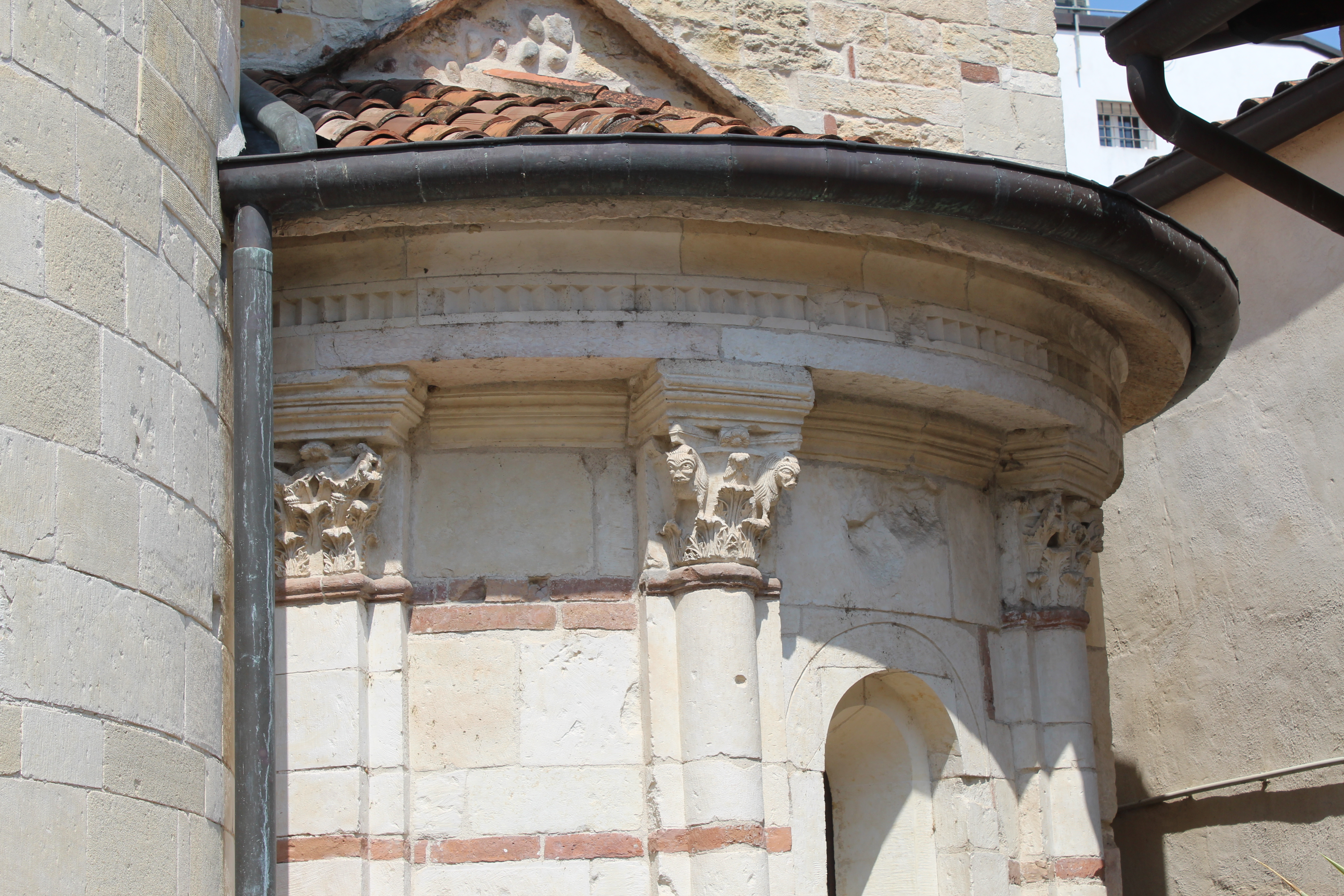
Detail of the north apse

The other two apses, made entirely of tuff, have no lesenes but feature a cornice with small arches, double lintels, surmounted by a sawtooth ornament and a finely carved frieze. The frieze of the central apse, in particular, features a number of hunting scenes including some dogs chasing prey and a hunter playing a horn, all sandwiched between an interlacing of flowers and striped leaves, sometimes open so that a pistil or pine cone can be glimpsed: a motif that can be found in other Veronese architecture of the same period. Both apses belong to the same construction phase of the church.

==== Cloister and bell tower ====
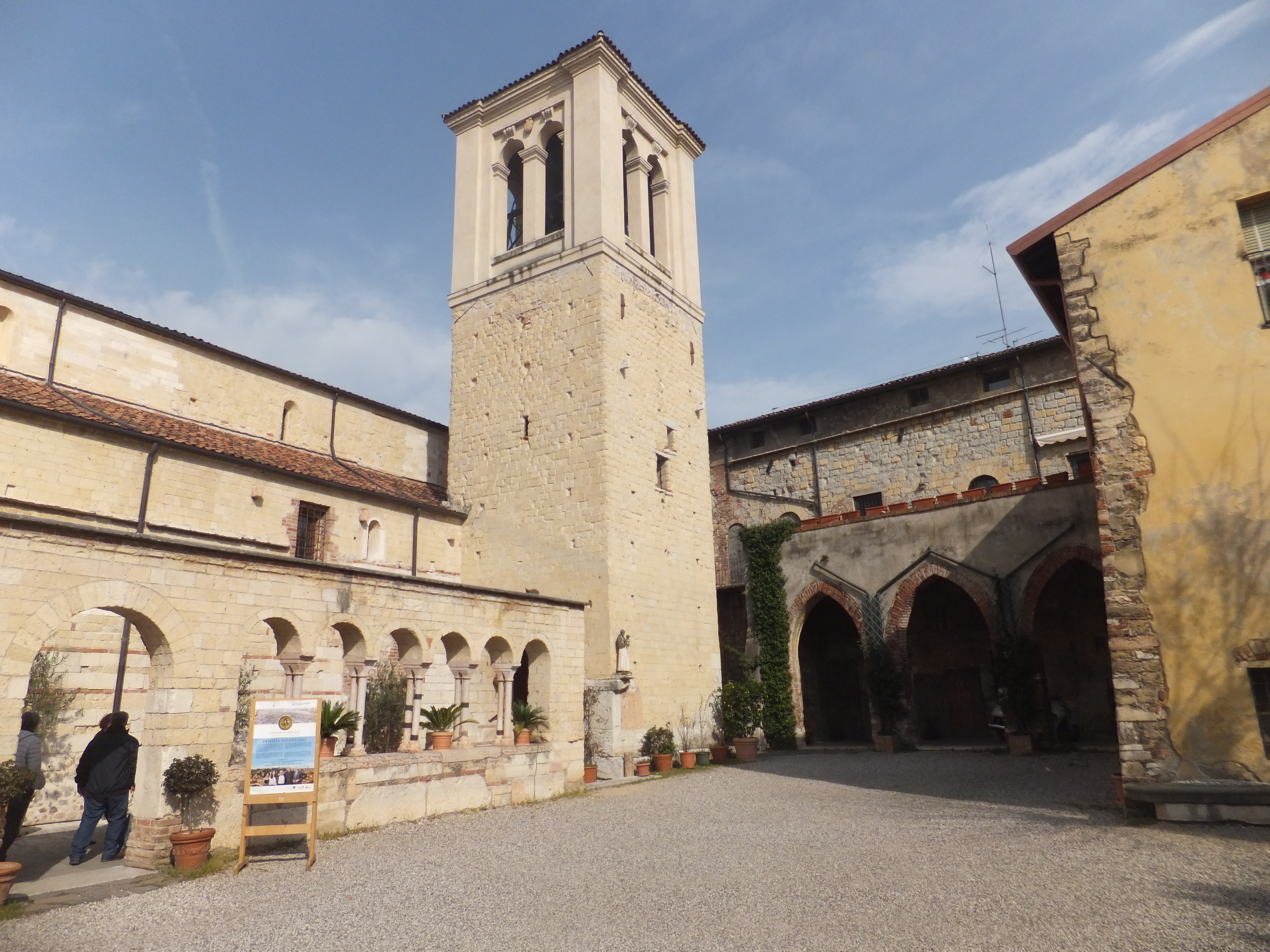
Part of the ancient cloister, bell tower and rectory

On the southern side, leaning against the church, rises a mighty bell tower with a square base, linked to the basilica building by means of mighty round arches that, to some scholars, are reminiscent of the fornices of the Roman Pietra bridge. Beyond the references that can be found to the classical examples, certainly a large number of the rubble stones that were used to construct the base of the bell tower itself are Roman. The lower part is in pure Romanesque style, while the upper part with the belfry, consisting of a mullioned window on each side, was added later, around the 16th century. The tower houses five sonorous bells tuned in the musical scale of F3, cast by the Cavadini firm in 1846. The major bell weighs 645 kg. The ensemble is still operated manually according to the Veronese bell ringing concert technique. Master bell ringer Luigi Gardoni wrote in the act of testing (contained in his Memoirs) that "everyone in Verona will be discussing the beautiful concert that happens in San Giovanni in Valle." Before these were two baroque bronzes by the foundryman Pisenti. The bell company of masters Gaspari and Ircamo was also notable.

Also to the south there stood a large and elegant cloister of which only a few rests remain today. Formed by a series of paired red marble columns with notched capitals, it originally extended up to the apses of the church and was entirely covered. Today the area of the former cloister constitutes a small courtyard accessible from the public street through a wide iron gate near which was placed, around the 14th century, an aedicula housing a statuette, strange in its deformity, depicting St. John the Baptist. The courtyard overlooks what was once the rectory where the clerics belonging to the collegiate church once lived. The style in which it was built suggests that it is the work of the same architect as the church and therefore also dates from 1120, so it can be concluded that it is one of the oldest residential buildings to be found in Verona; another similar example is in the vicinity of the church of San Procolo. In front there is a portico, certainly of a later date, consisting of pointed arches.

=== Interior ===
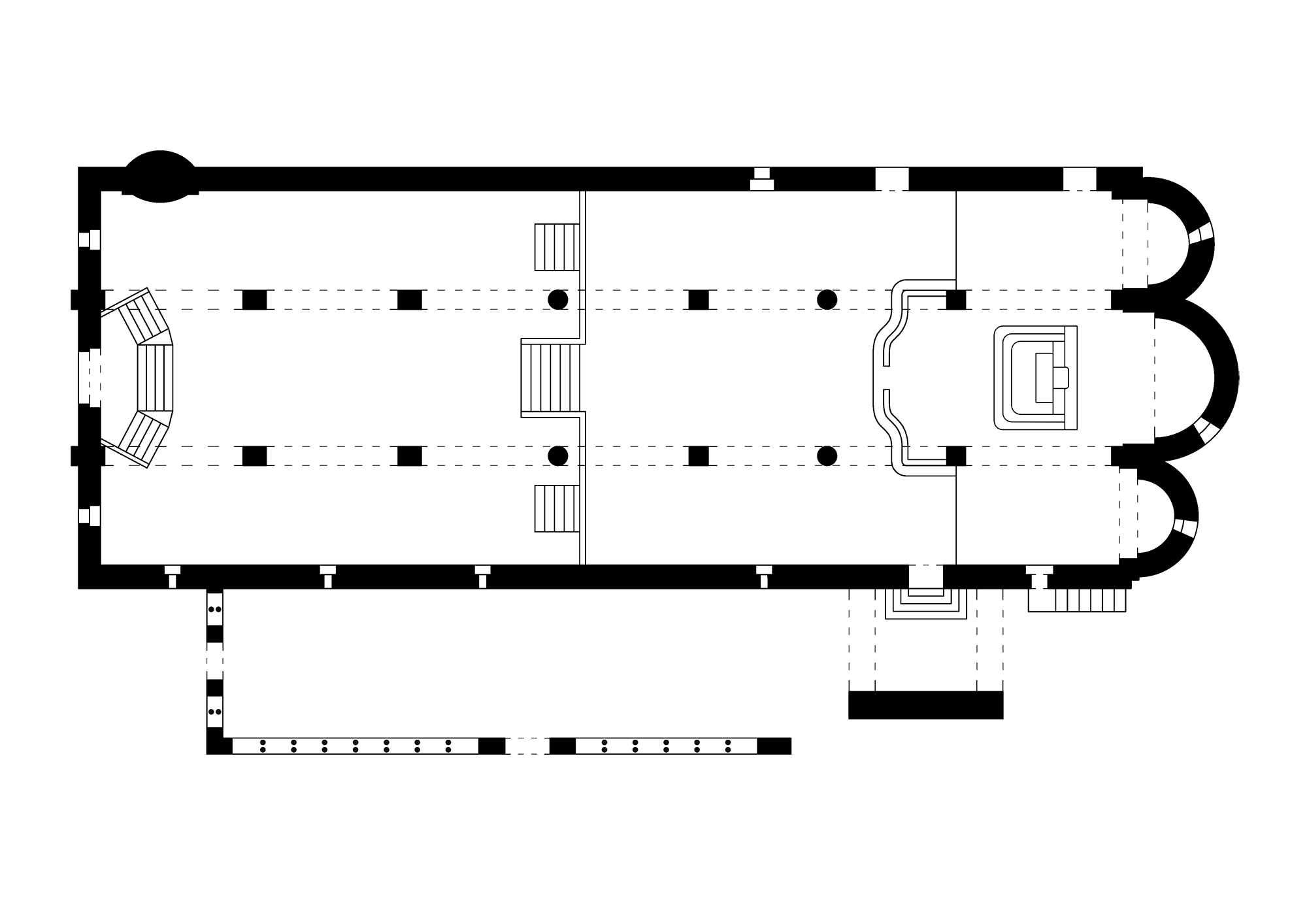
Church plan

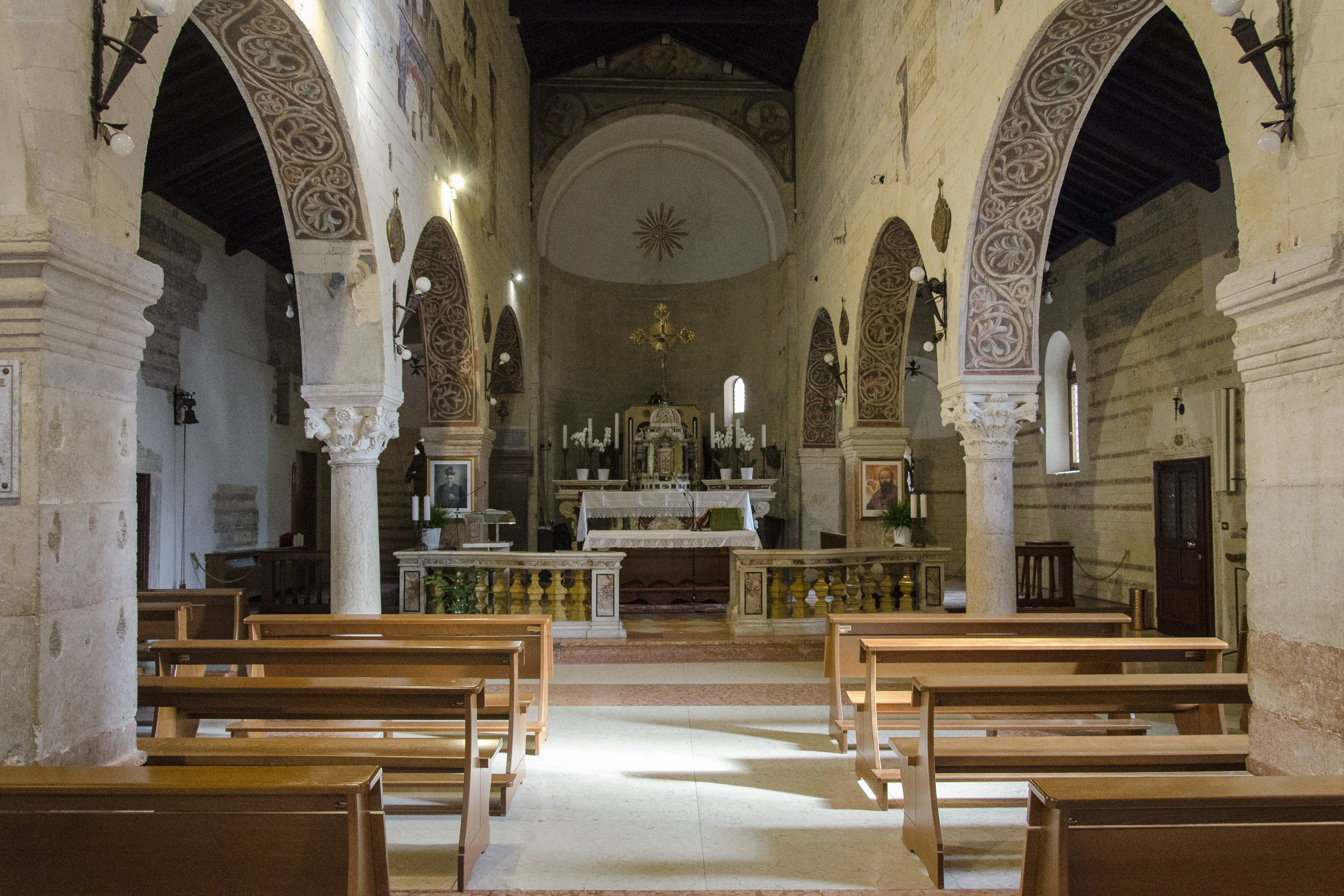
Interior of the church

The interior of the church, with a three-nave basilica plan without a transept, is covered with timber roof trusses and is lower than street level by five steps (about one meter). The terracotta floor is not the original one but dates from the 19th century. The interior space is developed on three levels: from the nave, access is gained to the presbytery located above via a wide staircase placed along the central axis about halfway up the church, while two smaller staircases, placed in continuation of the minor naves and covered by a barrel vault, provide access to the lower crypt; such a scheme can be found in other Romanesque churches in the province of Verona, such as Santo Stefano, San Severo, San Zeno, and in the Abbey of Villanova.

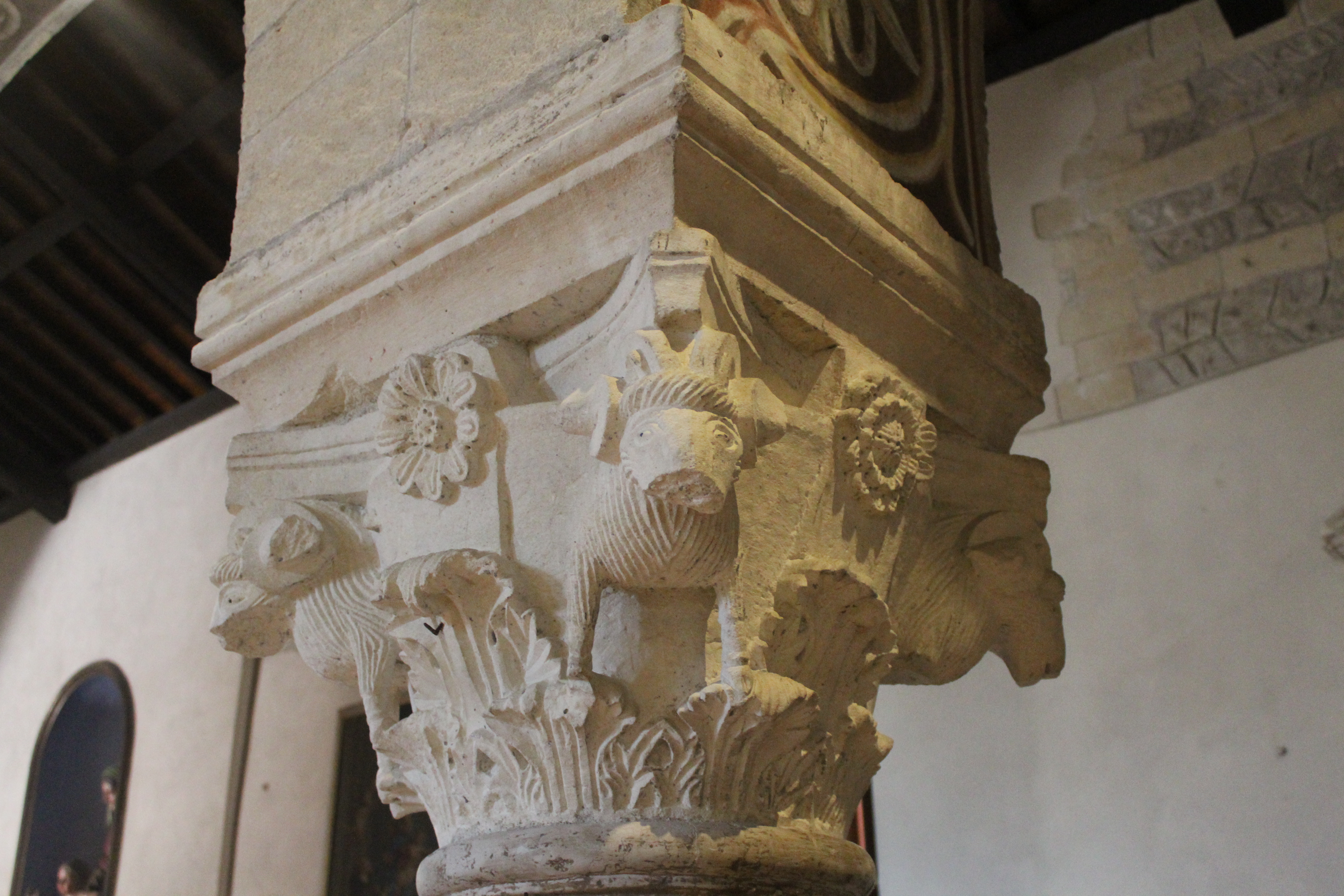
Finely carved capital of the church

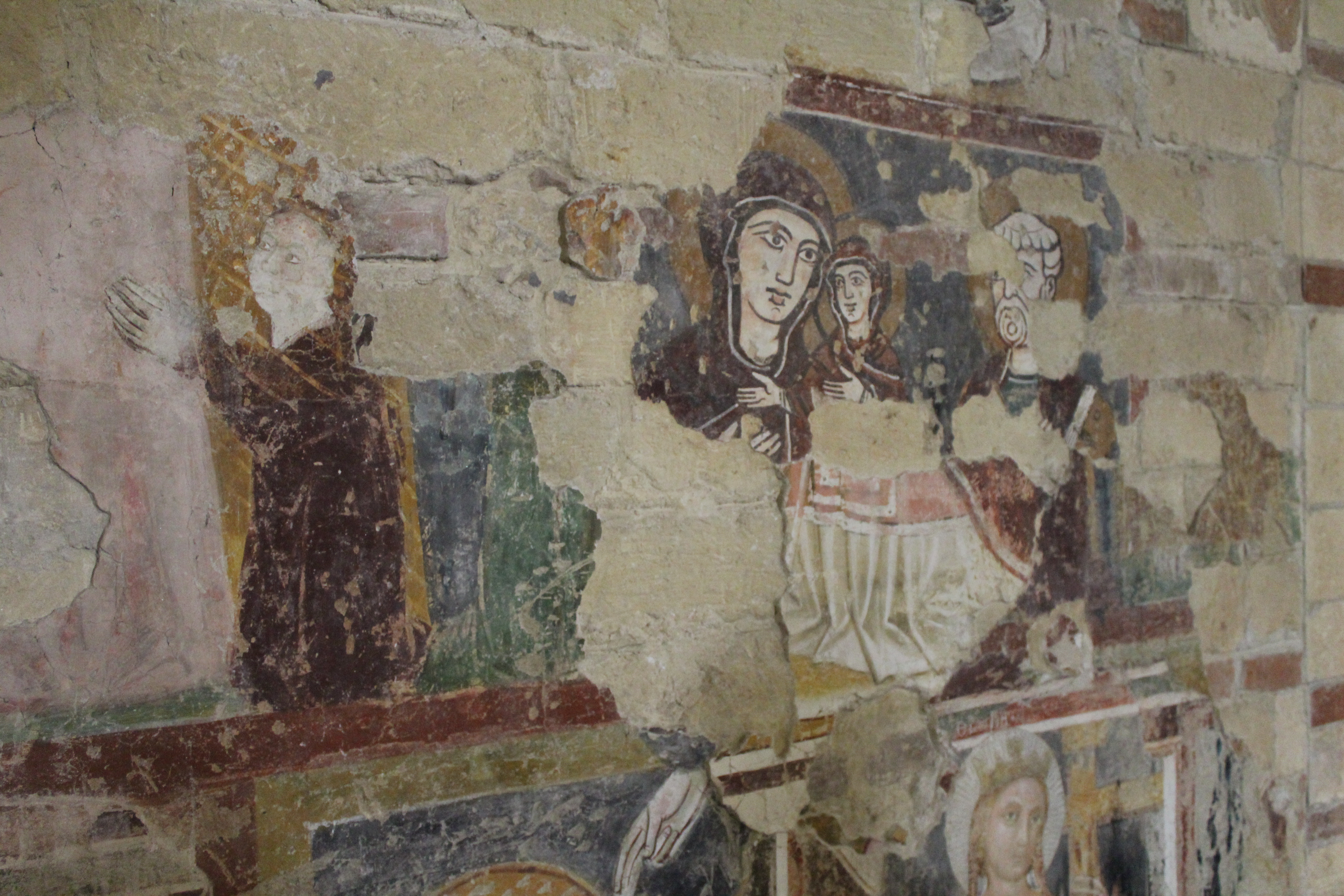
Remains of frescoes on the southern side

As soon as one enters the church, on the left, there is, in a niche in the wall, an octagonal marble baptismal font, the making of which can be dated several centuries after the construction of the church. The two side aisles are separated from the central one by two parallel rows of round arches supported by a regular alternation, beginning with the second pair, of columns and pillars with a square base. all of which have finely carved capitals. Among these is one characterized by the representation, at the corners, of ram's heads that resemble the same decorations found in the capital located on the outer wall of the left apse, leading one to assume that it is a work by the same author identified as the stonemason Pelegrinus, who was also the author of other works in Verona. On the walls are some fragments of frescoes from different eras, among them can be recognized St. Anthony the abbot, St. George and the dragon with two other saints, some overlapping frescoes dating from the 12th and 14th centuries depicting the Holy Family, St. Francis, St. Helena, and a transcription of an inscription in which it is recalled that the church was decorated in 1184 by a certain Beaguinus.

The chancel is bordered by a marble balustrade and houses the Baroque high altar. In the main apse of the church, behind the altar, is the pipe organ, manufactured in 1993 by Bartolomeo Formentelli. With tracker action, it has 19 registers and a console with two keyboards of 54 notes each and a pedalboard of 27 notes. It replaced the previous one made in 1960 by Felice Corrà of Brenzone sul Garda equipped with 1 manual of 54 keys and a pedalboard of 25 keys.

==== Crypt ====
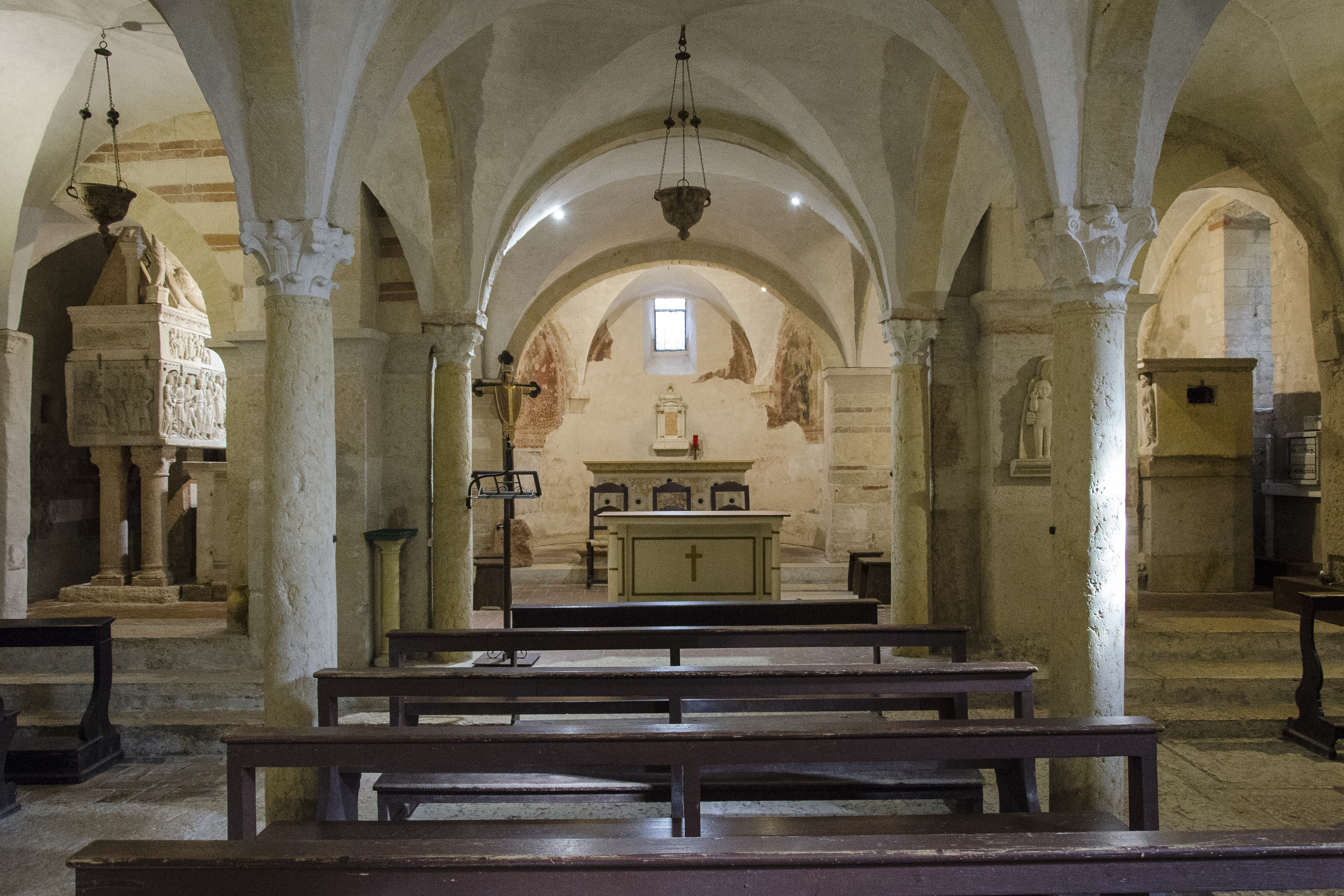
The crypt

Two staircases, located to the right and left of the chancel, lead to the crypt that was part of the early church. The hall, structured on three naves, is divided into a front space, probably the oldest and dating perhaps to the 9th century, covered by three rib vaults supported by columns, and a rear part presumably contemporary to the construction of the upper church and also covered by cross vaults supported by wide pillars, almost all of which have an elegant abacus. To the east, the crypt concludes with three apses, made of simple unadorned masonry, placed in continuation of the three naves; the left and central basins turn out to be decorated with frescoes of which only a few traces remain, worn away by time and moisture; in particular, one can distinguish depictions of the Madonna and Saints and of the Annunciation and Visit of the Magi. At the end of the middle nave is the 16th-century altar in polychrome marble.

At the right and left apse are two sarcophagi, most likely from the pagan and later Christian cemetery that existed there and on which the church was built. The one on the left is believed to date from the 4th century and is called "of Saints Simon and Judas" because tradition has it that the relics of the apostles Simon the Canaanite and Judas Thaddeus are preserved there, while the one on the right, probably of pagan origin, is earlier and possibly dated to the 3rd century.

===== 4th century sarcophagus (left side) =====
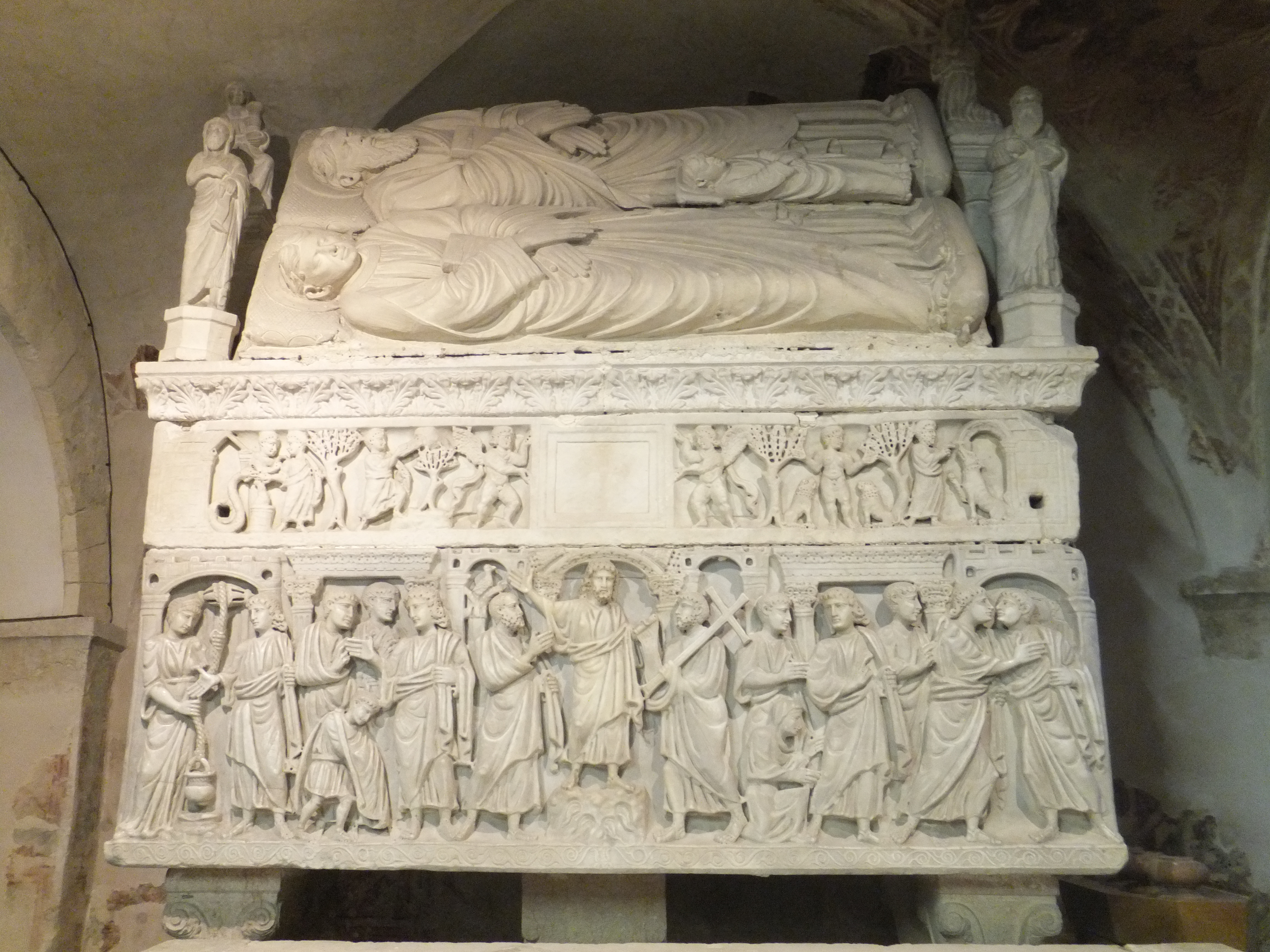
4th century sarcophagus

To the left of the high altar, erected on four columns, is an early Christian sarcophagus, which can be traced back to around the 4th century; it is admirable for its elegance and the realism of the figures. Also known as the "sarcophagus of Saints Simon and Judas," it is entirely carved on three sides, as it was initially made to hang on a wall. On the front side, the decoration is divided into two overlapping orders in which scenes are depicted, sometimes divided by background architectural elements ("city wall"), sometimes seamlessly, a style often used in Roman art to depict a narrative: other illustrious examples may be the Trajan and Marcus Aurelius columns.

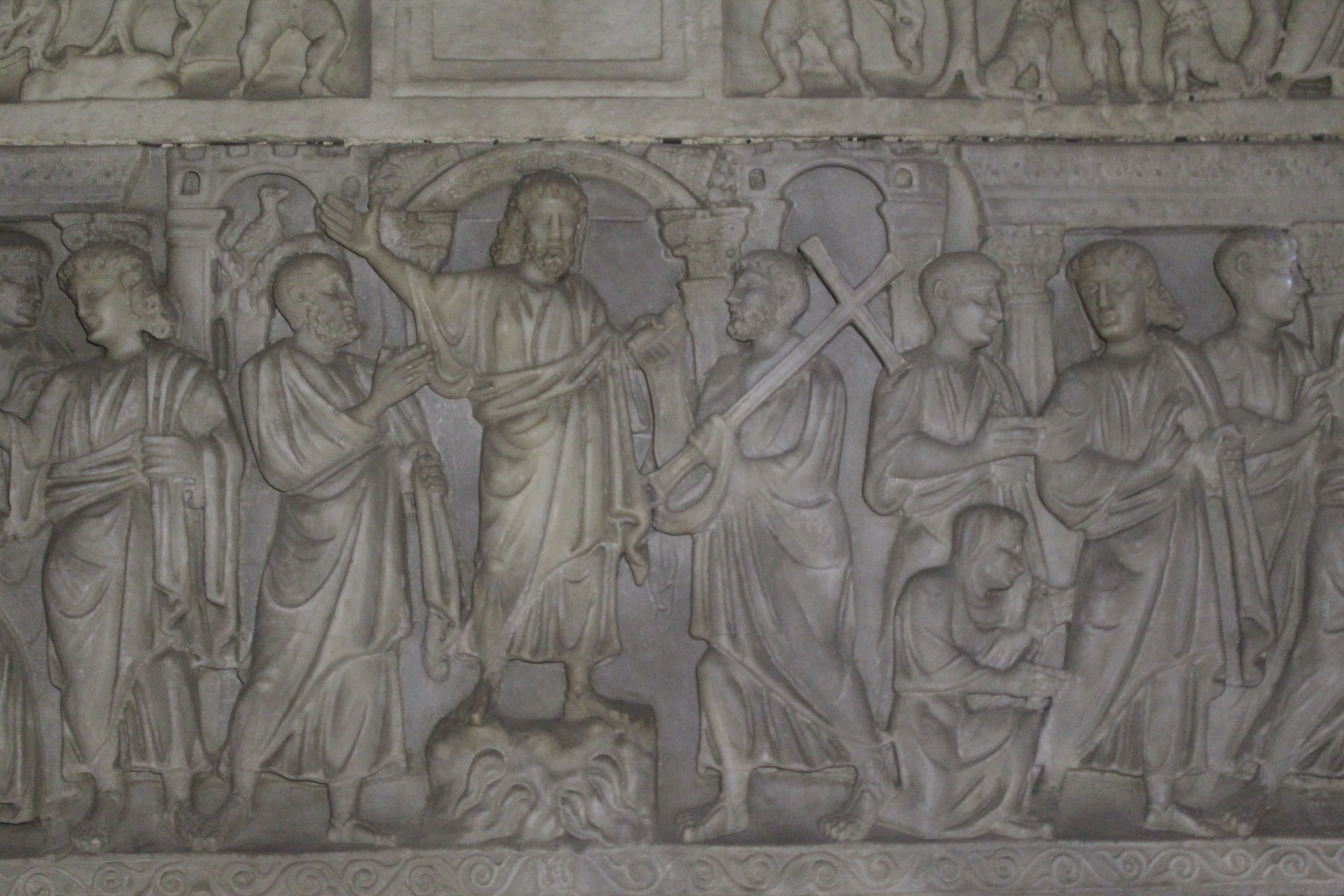
Detail of the New Testament narration

The upper order depicts facts from the Old Testament divided by carved trees, from left: the prophet Daniel and the serpent, Moses receiving the Ten Commandments, Daniel in the lions' den, a prophet (perhaps Jeremiah, Tobiah or Isaiah) with a dog. In the lower order, however, there are stories from the New Testament, again from the left: Jesus and the Samaritan woman, Jesus with the centurion of Capernaum asking him for mercy, Christ on the rock from which the streams of the Earthly Paradise spring with St. Peter and St. Andrew with the cross (or St. Paul) beside him, the sick woman touching Jesus' garments, Judas' kiss to Christ. On the right side, however, is the depiction of Adam and Eve while on the opposite side Cain and Abel (or according to a different interpretation Joseph and his brothers) are carved. At the four corners of the sarcophagus small statues stand in which some critics have identified the possible depiction of the apostles Simon and Judas in monastic dress and two women representing two virtues.

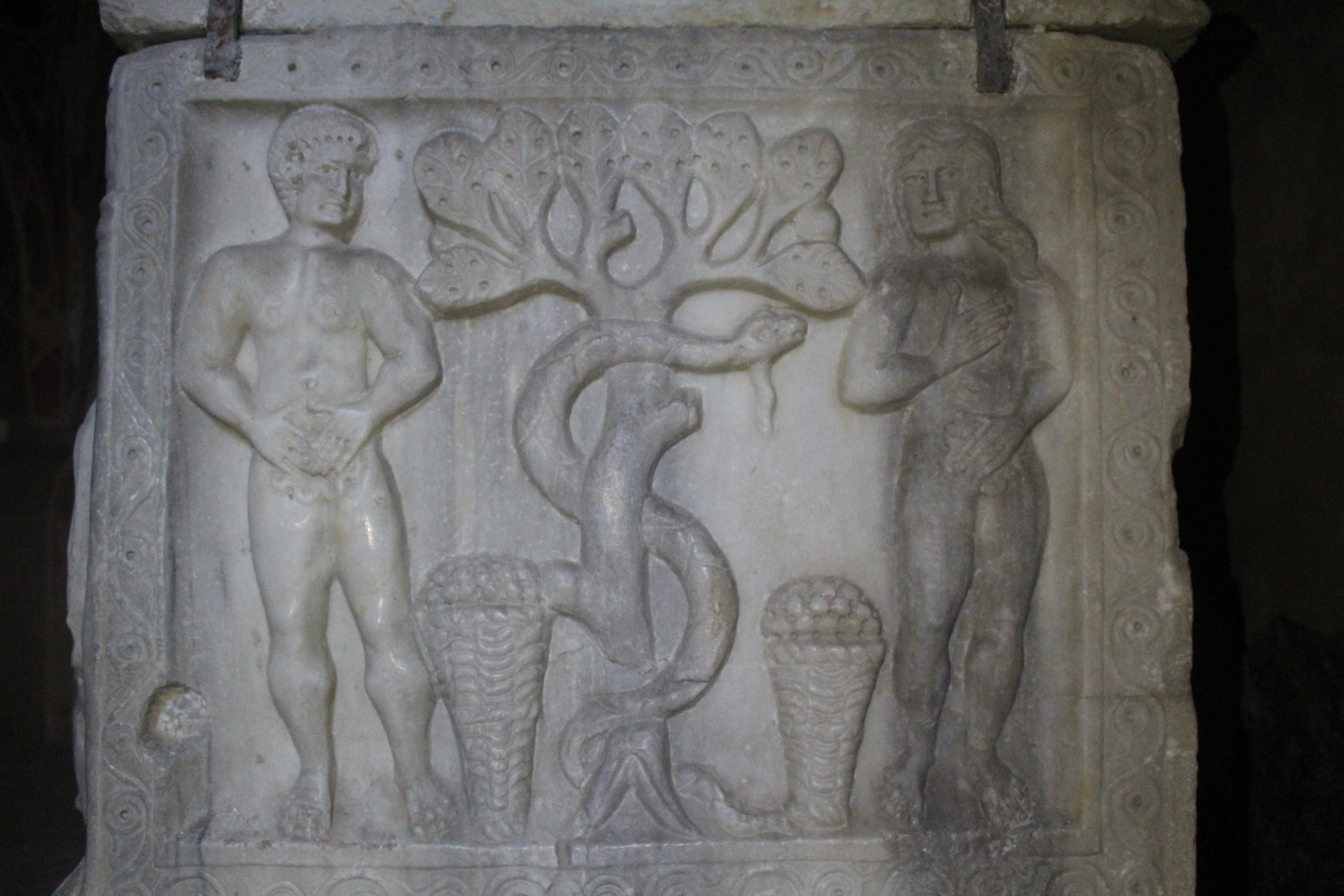
Detail of the Adam and Eve scene

The lid of the sarcophagus is not the original one, which must have been flat in shape. The current one, pitched with depictions of Saints Simon and Judas with the disciple Saturninus in the middle lying in a rigid posture, was placed in 1395 when the alleged discovery of the relics of the two saints took place. Regarding this event, Count Ludovico Moscardo (1611-1681), historian and naturalist, in his Historia Di Verona (1668) remarked, "In this same time in the Church of San Giovanni in Valle were found the Holy Bodies of S.S. Simon and Thaddeus the Apostles, enclosed in a marble ark, which from some letters carved on them were known to be of those glorious Saints, which were devoutly visited by all the people of Verona, and shortly afterwards by public order there were carved in the same ark some figures and the names of the Saints." Later additions were also the cornice and the two "side ornaments" that "by fineness of work and technique can be traced back to the first or second century of the Empire."

===== 3rd century sarcophagus (right side) =====
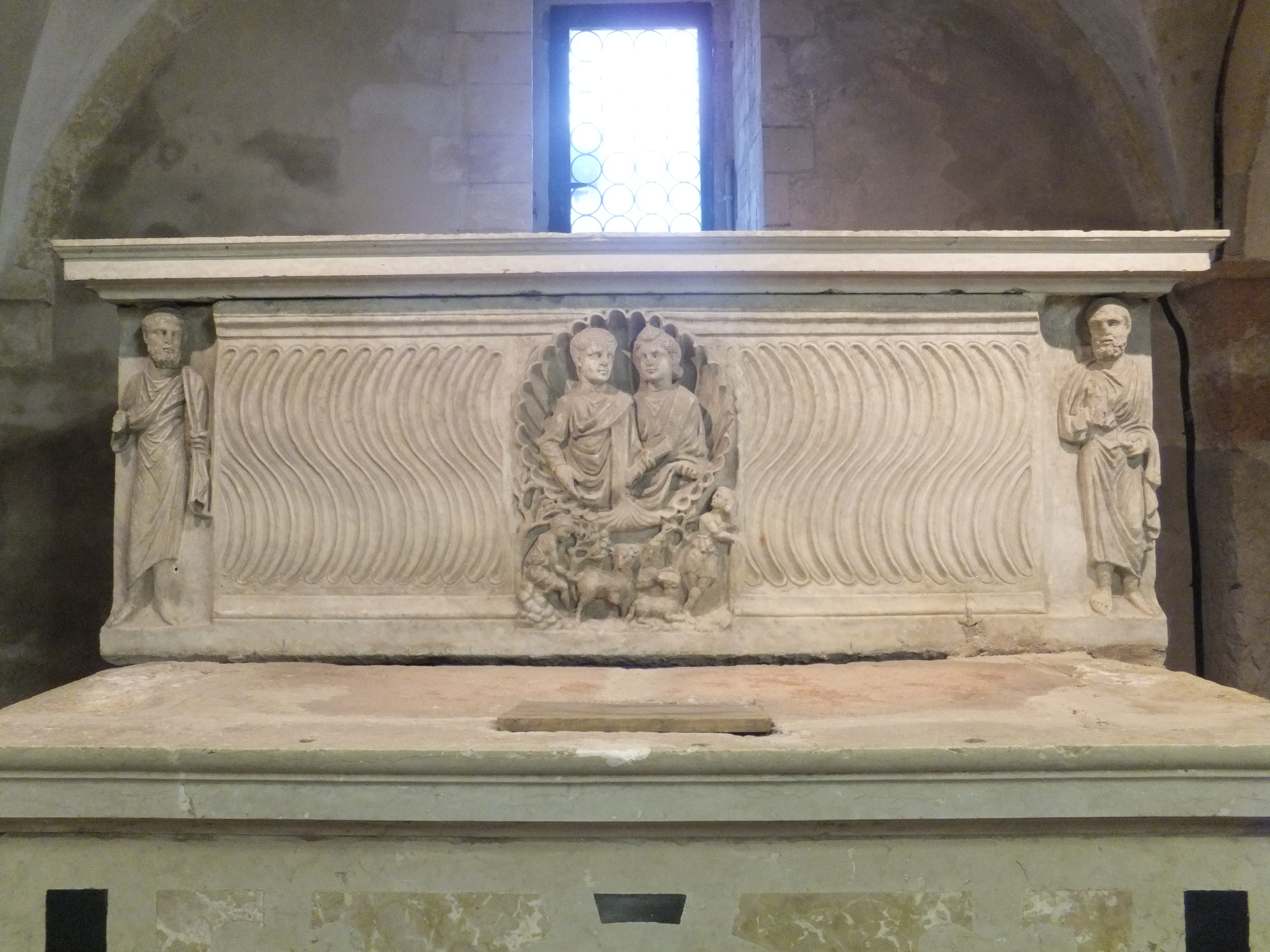
3rd century sarcophagus

To the right of the altar is a sarcophagus whose making has been dated, observing its style, to the third century (or according to others even to the second century), thus suggesting that it was initially pagan. Made of Parian marble, it has on the front side extensive strigilation, that is, wide undulating grooves, an element typical of Roman sarcophagi of the 3rd and 4th centuries. In the center the strigilation is interrupted to give way to a shell in which are inserted the busts of two spouses looking at each other: the portrait of the husband, wearing a tunic, appears with marked realism, while in that of the wife the hair combed into braids according to the custom of the time stands out. Below the two figures is carved a pastoral scene consisting of some sheep among shepherds and saplings. One of the two shepherds is depicted seated in the act of handing something to a nearby sheep while the other appears leaning on a stick with a thoughtful look.

In the corners are two figures wearing togas originally representing philosophers and later modified to depict St. Peter with the keys and St. Paul wielding a sword. The lid is of more recent date. Tradition has it that some relics of the Holy Innocents are kept inside.

== See also ==
- Verona
- Roman Catholic Diocese of Verona
- John the Baptist

== Bibliography ==
- Arslan, Wart (1939). L'architettura romanica veronese. Verona.
- Barbetta, Guido (1970). Le mura e le fortificazioni di Verona. Edizioni di Vita Veronese.
- Benini, Gianfranco (1988). Le chiese di Verona: guida storico-artistica. Arte e natura libri.
- Battista Biancolini, Giovanni (1749–1771). Notizie storiche delle chiese di Verona. Vol. Libro IV.
- Borelli, Giorgio, ed. (1980). Chiese e monasteri di Verona. Verona: Banca Popolare di Verona.
- Gardoni, Luigi (2010). Nicola Patria (ed.). Diario veronese (1826-1850). Verona: Archivio storico Curia diocesana.
- Girardi, Enrico (1968). Gli organi della città di Verona. Alba: Edizioni Paoline.
- Maimeri, Mario (1958). Verona: panorama artistico. Verona: Edizioni di Vita Veronese.
- Moscardo, Ludovico (1668). Historia di Verona. Verona.
- Romanini, Angiola Maria (1964). L'arte romanica. Verona e il suo territorio. Verona.
- Sambugar, Marta (1974). Una pieve a Verona: S. Giovanni in Valle. Vicenza: Edizioni di “vita veronese”.
- Sancassani, Pietro (2001). Luciano Rognini (ed.). Le mie campane: storia di un'arte e di una tradizione del Mellenovecento. Verona: Offset Print.
- Viviani, Giuseppe Franco (2004). Chiese nel veronese. Verona: Società cattolica di assicurazione.
