= 1117 Verona earthquake =

Earthquake that struck northern Italy and Germany

- Location within Alps
- Local date: 3 January 1117
- Magnitude: M 6.5–7.0
- Epicenter: 45°30′N 11°00′E
- Max. intensity: MMI IX (Violent)

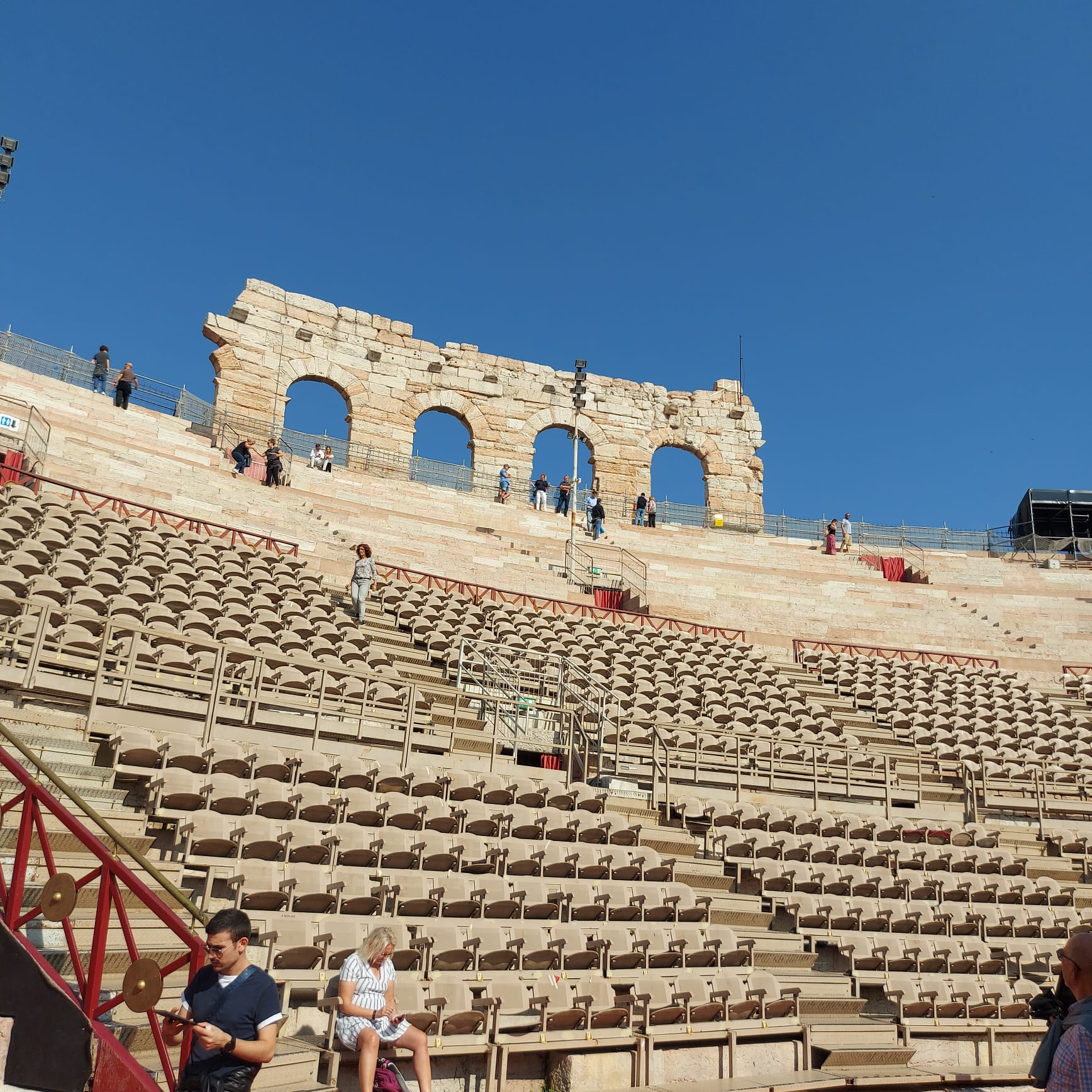
The remnant of the outer wall of the Arena di Verona.

An earthquake, rated at IX (Violent) on the Mercalli intensity scale, struck northern Italy and Germany on 3 January 1117. The epicentre of the first shock was near Verona, the city which suffered the most damage. The outer wall of the Verona Arena partially collapsed, and the standing portion was damaged in a later earthquake of 1183. After the first shock of 3 January, seismic activity persisted for months, striking on 12 January, 4 June, 1 July, 1 October, and 30 December.

== Geology ==
The earthquake, estimated at magnitude 6.5–7.0, was the largest in northern Italy. Its effects in the Verona region was devastating. The assigned maximum intensity on the MCS scale was IX. Damage in southern Germany and Pisa were initially attributed to this single event in the works of early scholars, however, they are now widely accepted that three distinct earthquakes occurred within the span of several hours. The first earthquake affected the towns of Augsburg, Dissibodenberg, Freising, Petershausen, Saint Blasien and Zwiefalten of Germany, and Melk and Salzburg in Austria. In Augsburg, several cantle collapsed. The collapse of a tower killed an unspecified number of people. The epicenter of this estimated magnitude 6.4 shock was in southern Germany. The earthquake that affected Verona occurred some 12 or 13 hours after the southern Germany event. A possible third shock occurred near Pisa with an epicenter area likely in the Serchio Valley. This shock toppled many towers and infrastructure. The timing of this event coincided with the Verona shock, however, there remains an uncertainty if this was truly a separate event. The maximum seismic intensity assigned was VII-VIII on the MCS scale. This earthquake was preceded by a non-damaging foreshock early in the morning.

== Damage ==
The earthquake in Verona in 1117 was the strongest recorded in the history of northern Italy. It was not only felt in Verona, but across northern Italy, from Cividale to Pavia, south to Pisa and north to Switzerland. Outside of Verona, the most damaged areas were Milan, Bergamo, Brescia, Venice, Treviso, Modena, Parma, and Cremona. The main churches of Padua all suffered major damage. News of the earthquake reached Montecassino and Reims. The Milanese chronicler Landolfo Iuniore reported that the church synods needed to be carried out in the open air due to the destruction. In Germany, damage was also extensive. The Michaelskirche in Bamberg, the abbey at Brauweiler, and buildings in Rottenburg am Neckar, Constance, Meersburg, and Fénis were all reported damaged. Many churches, monasteries, and ancient monuments were destroyed or seriously damaged in Verona itself, eliminating much of Verona's early medieval architecture and providing space for a massive Romanesque rebuilding. In the province of Veneto, many churches were severely damaged: in Brescia, Cremona, in the northern part of the Emilia plain and along the central route of the Adige river, and partial collapse of churches in Padua, Piacenza, Parma, and Modena.

== Aftershocks ==
Following the primary earthquake on 3 January 1117, the region experienced a series of significant aftershocks. Notable aftershocks occurred on 12 January, 4 June, 1 July, October 1, and 30 December of the same year. This prolonged seismic activity contributed to the extensive damage observed across the affected regions.

== Repair Efforts ==
In the aftermath of the 1117 earthquake, significant restoration initiatives were undertaken to rebuild the damaged structures. Notable, in Parma, contemporary records indicate that the Cathedral's façade collapsed due to the quake's impact. Reconstruction efforts included repairing the collapsed walls and introducing a new type of truss system, designed to reduce the building's vulnerability to future seismic events.

== See also ==
- Church of San Giovanni in Valle
- List of earthquakes in Italy
- List of historical earthquakes
- Verona Arena

== Notes ==
Sources

- Guidoboni, E.; Comastri, S.; Boschi, E. (2005), "The "exceptional" earthquake of 3 January 1117 in the Verona area (northern Italy): A critical time review and detection of two lost earthquakes (lower Germany and Tuscany)", Journal of Geophysical Research, 110 (B12309), Bibcode:2005JGRB..11012309G, doi:10.1029/2005JB003683
