= Veronese bell ringing =

Italian tradition of full circle ringing

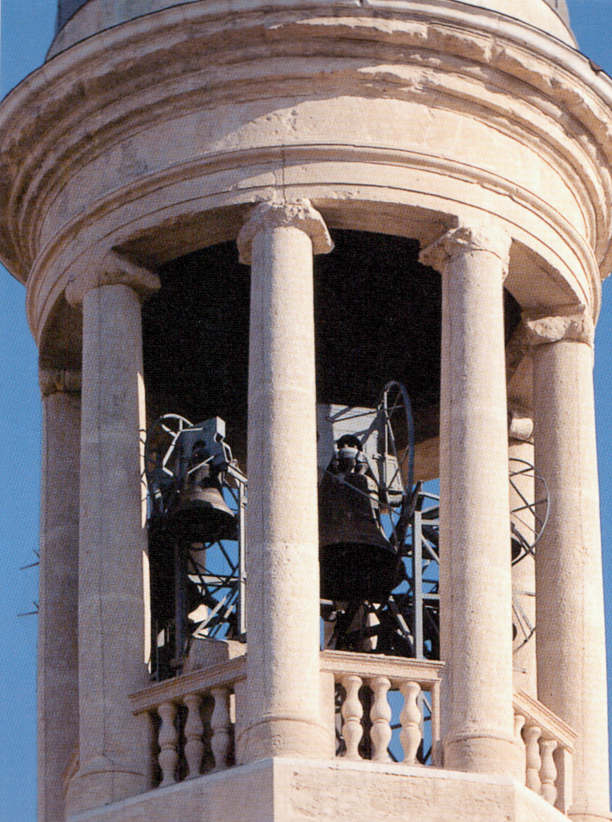
The bell chamber in the campanile of San Massimo, Verona

Veronese bell ringing is a style of ringing church bells that developed around Verona, Italy, from the eighteenth century. The bells are manually rung full circle (mouth uppermost to mouth uppermost), being held up by a rope and wheel until a note is required.

== History ==
=== Early history ===
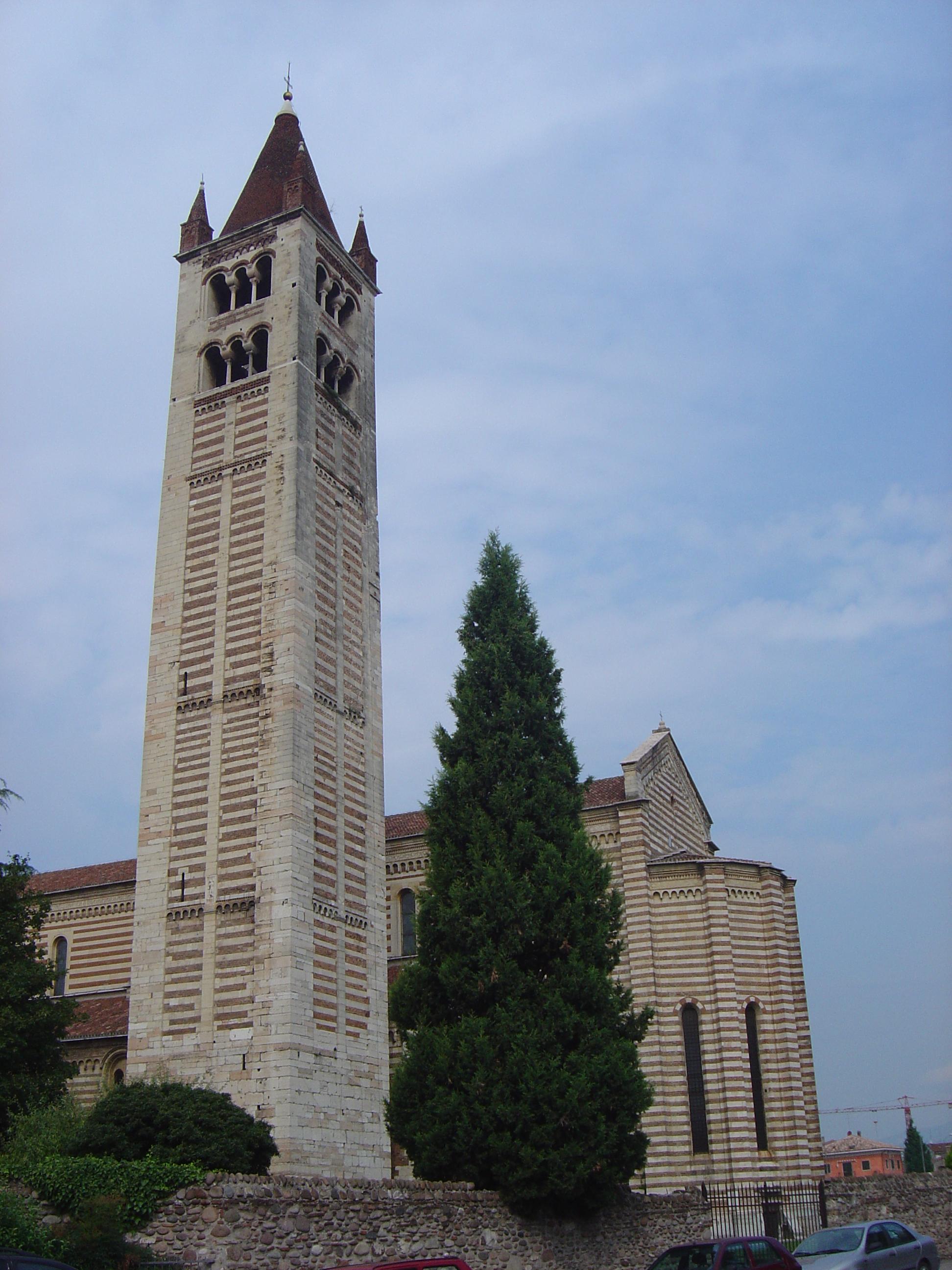
The campanile of San Zeno Maggiore

In The History of Verona Ludovico Moscardo records that on the 21 November 622 the bell towers of the city rang to announce the death of Bishop Mauro. It is not known how many towers and bells, but clearly by that date Verona had a tradition of ringing. In the following century the bell "the storm" ("dei temporali") was cast. It is of octagonal shape and thought to be one of the oldest such castings in Europe. It is now preserved in the San Zeno Museum in Verona.

The earliest technical information on the casting of Veronese bells is by the master (Note: The Italian original uses both the terms "maestro" and "mastro" to describe master bellfounders.) Gislimerio in 1149. He described the casting of the bells for San Zeno Maggiore. Gislimerio was the first of fifty bell founders which worked in Verona over the centuries. Initially the shape of the bells were empirical, however from around 1200 studies were done to determine the best shape. The results were then shared across the continent. Other castings were made in 1065 for San Fermo, 1081 for San Massimo and 1172 for San Salvar.

Up until the 14th century the best bell founders were from Venice, due to its more advanced industry, but there were skilled veronese founders too. Master Jacopo considered by some to be one of the best of the time. In 1370 he cast the bell for the Gardello tower. It is 130 centimetres (51 in) wide and it weighs about 18 quintals or 1,800 kilograms (4,000 lb) (35-2-24) (Note: cwt-qtr-lb, the usual way of measuring bell weights in the UK) The tower is a clock tower unattached to a church. The 1370 clock was one of the first striking clocks in the world. The bell is now in the Castelvecchio Museum.

In the 15th century when Verona was given to Venice there were few native Veronese foundry workers and therefore itinerant workmen worked for the Veronese masters. Bells for San Zeno were made by German workmen and that for the castle of Malcesine by Spaniards. A Frenchman, Mr. Michel, started a company in Verona that continued until the 19th century. He studied the sound of the bells, designing a shape which created a pleasant and tuneful sound. His successors, such as Checcherle and Bonaventurini, continued the development and started to apply decorations making the bells into works of art. Particularly skilled founder was Gasparino which made in 1444 one bell for Santa Maria della Scala, still rung actually. In this century, wonderful belltowers were built up such as Santa Anastasia.

In the 16th century the number of bells in some towers increased. The first rings of five or six bells were in four churches: San Zeno, Santa Maria in Organo, Santa Maria della Scala and Santa Anastasia. All four were monasteries where the monks rang the bells themselves. In 1557 the Bonaventurini foundry cast the 4,215 kilograms (9,292 lb) (82-3-24) "Rengo" civic bell which is still in good condition today. Reinassence style belltowers are San Nazaro and Santa Maria in Organo.

During the 17th century the Da Levo family and their students (one of whom was Pesenti) were casting diatonically tuned bells. Common arrangements were the major chord (doh-me-soh-doh', (Note: In eastern and southern Europe and in Spanish speaking countries do = C (known as fixed do). In northern Europe and hence throughout the Commonwealth and the USA doh = the tonic (known as moveable doh). In addition spellings vary, that used here is from the Royal Schools of Music.) for example C E G C'), the Gloria (doh-ray-fah, for example C D F) or the subdominant (doh-far-doh', for example C F C'). Significant churches equipped installations were Madonna di Campagna, San Bernardino, San Nicolò all'Arena and the cathedral. At the latter the bell ringers were lay musicians living in the city western suburbs who were paid with a reduction in the rent of arable land. The first evidence of wheels and counterbalances dates from this period; from which it is supposed that the bells were starting to be rung in sequence, rather than swung randomly. The Da Levo family specialised in making small and medium size fully decorated bells. In 1653 Pesenti cast the 6,000 kilograms (13,000 lb) (116-0-8) civic bell of Bergamo, which is still in use today. Pupils of Pesenti were De Rossi, Poni, Larducci and Micheletti (dead 1804).

In the mid-18th century another three interesting rings were installed. One was made by Crespi foundry for the Monastery of San Fermo, another by Antonio Larducci for Santa Lucia which was the last one made in the French-Veronese Renaissance style. In 1776 Professor Giuseppe Ruffini cast a ring for San Giorgio in Braida. Crespi and Ruffini introduced the "Manieristica" shape to Verona. This new shape had originated in the 16th century in the Alps and it became the basis for shapes still used today. The San Giorgio in Braida bells are notable works of art both for decoration and musical precision.

=== Development of Veronese style ringing ===
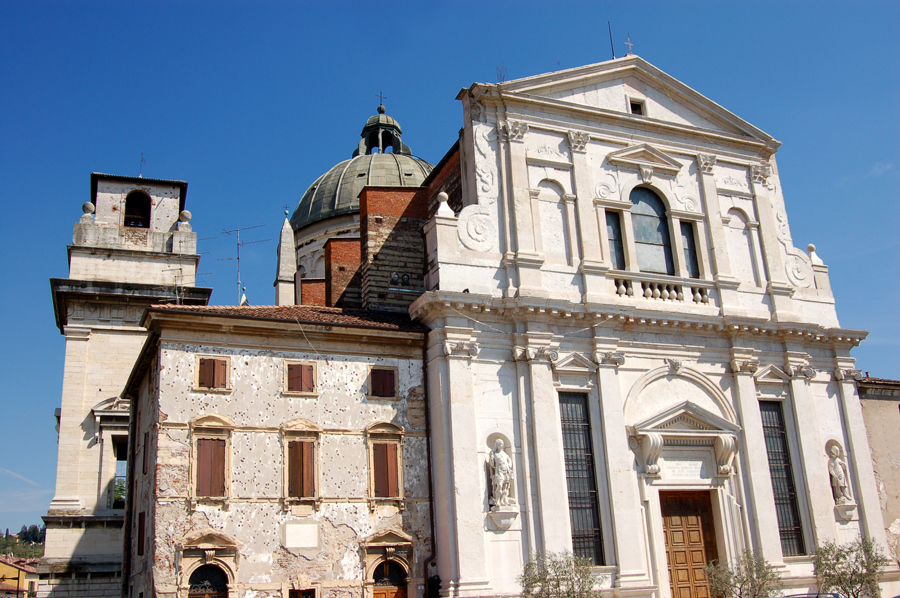
San Giorgio in Braida, birthplace of the Veronese system of ringing

In San Giorgio in Braida the new bells were hung in such a way that the new style of ringing could develop. The bells are hung for full circle ringing where each bell is swung from balanced mouth uppermost through 360 degrees to again balanced mouth uppermost. This method of ringing permits a precise control of the time that the bell sounds and hence allows music. It is not clear whether hanging the bells in this way was independently developed at San Giorgio or whether the method was imported from England where bells are also hung for full circle ringing. Local farmers who attended church services and had an aptitude for music were chosen to ring and look after maintenance of the bells of San Giorgio. They developed the art of ringing concerti. The new style of music was not appreciated by Holy Roman Emperor Joseph II, but was loved by Pope Pius VI who listened to it in February 1782.

The ringers were paid for their efforts with food given to them at the start of autumn (fall): "polenta, salame e vino rosso" (polenta, salami and red wine). The ringing was quite onerous, on holy days they had to get up very early for the Ave Maria, then play again for the principal mass, the afternoon and evening service and finally at night for the vespers. They eventually used to sell the food, receiving an amount of about current 130 euro per year.

At around the same time the bells of Santa Maria in Organo were modified, probably to allow them to play concerti. Many of the churches of Verona started to follow this example and the original ringers of San Giorgio in Braida were sent to organize the bands and train the new players.

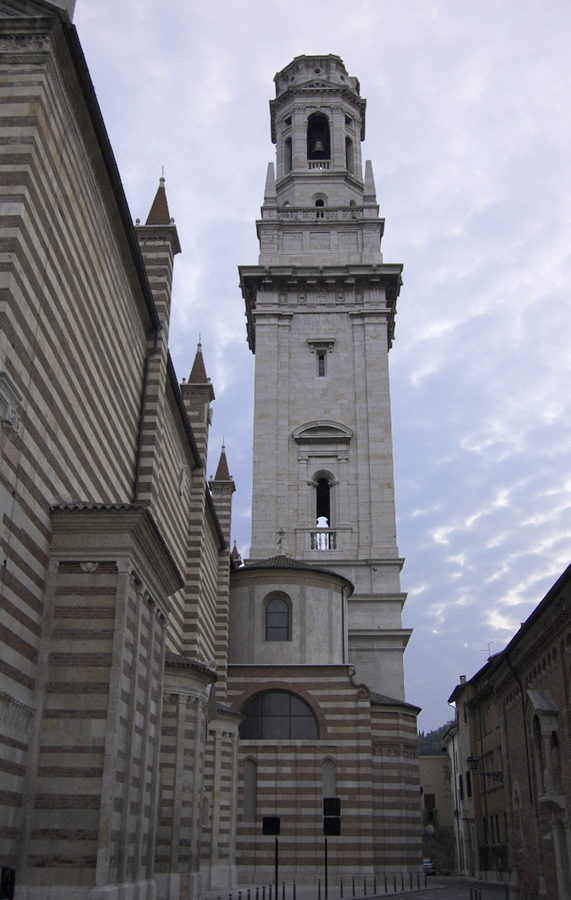
The campanile of Verona Cathedral

The next tower to be converted was Santissima Trinità in 1803. Next Chievo (1808) and then later the cathedral, Santi Apostoli, Santo Stefano, San Salvatore Corte Regia and Santa Anastasia. The ringers at Santa Anastasia were a group who worked on the floating mills on the river Adige, behind the apse of the basilica. This demand for new bells led to four bell foundries, managed by the students of Ruffini: Partilora-Selegari, Chiappani and son, and the two Cavadini companies.

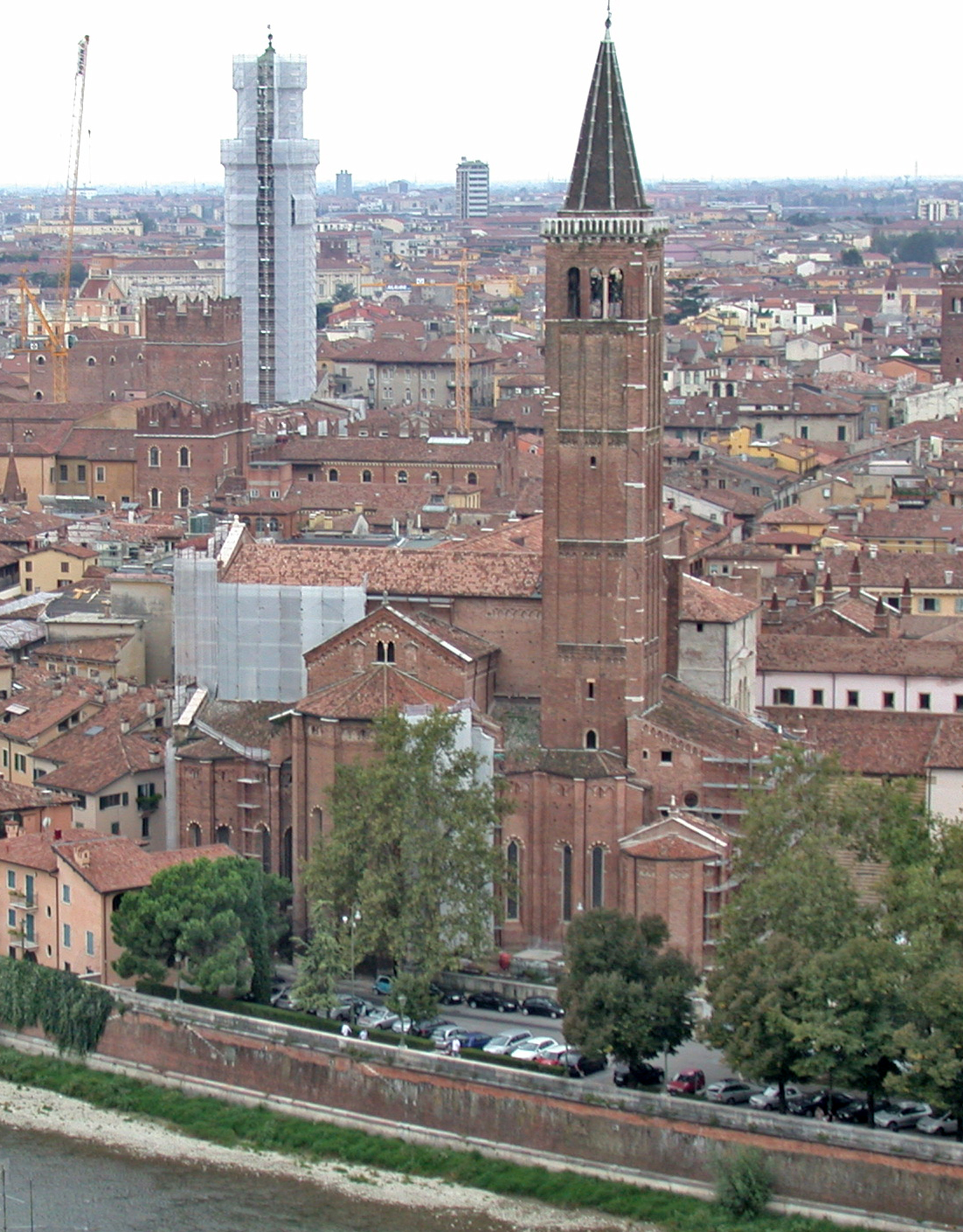
Santa Anastasia

The only significant adverse effect was the extinction of the older technique of bell ringing as a carillon. This tradition came from the masters like Vincenzi and Gardoni, some of whom decided to change technique by starting to ring the bells with their new method. An example is Giacomo Milossi (a student of Gardoni) whose skill was praised in a sonnet commemorating the bells of Santa Anastasia. In 1820 the church group from Tomba arrived to give a peal, followed by another wonderful peal in the bell tower of San Tomaso Becket, Quinzano e Parona.

The priest at the Stimate brought together a band of ringers under the tutelage of Modesto Cainer. Writing in his memoirs he describes the precise methods of playing a concert in rounds with the sacred bronze bell. The Partilora-Selegari foundry equipped the bell towers of San Lorenzo and San Massimo which were the first in the region to have eight bells, each of which required yet another ringing team.

In 1846 the Cavadini company installed a new ring in San Giovanni in Valle and three years later in San Nazaro. New groups of players were created which tried to compete with the ringers of San Giorgio. At the same time the towers predisposed to the technique of playing in rounds had increased, for example San Michele, Santa Maria del Paradiso, San Paolo, Poiano e Avesa, each tower having new ringers' societies. In this period bellringers in the city centre were about 150, most of whom resided in the suburbs.

The only remaining supplier of bells after 1850 was Luigi Cavadini, whose company continued until 1974. With the reconstruction of the biggest bell of S. Trinità, some young people from the area created a group of concert players which was then absorbed by San Giorgio, at the time directed by the Peroni brothers and Giacomo Tomasini.

The same thing happened to Molinari's group. In 1882 the bells of Scalzi and Santa Eufemia were increased in size and number.

=== 20th century ===
In the church of Santa Maria della Scala a new group was started directed at first by Pietro Sancassani (1881–1972) and then by future maestros Alberti, Oliboni and Signorato. In 1902 in S. Rocco another peal was cast and another ringing society was born.

In 1903 a new bell tower installation was created in Cà di David, where for the inauguration there was the first competition of bell ringing. This event was organized in a way so that all the teams of the city and also from the suburbs like Chievo and Santa Lucia, had to adhere to the oldest and most prestigious: San Giorgio in Braida. The team of San Giorgio won the competition despite the allegation that the other teams cheated, this event started the rivalry between the city players and those of the province.

The San Bernardino Church acquired their bells in 1907.

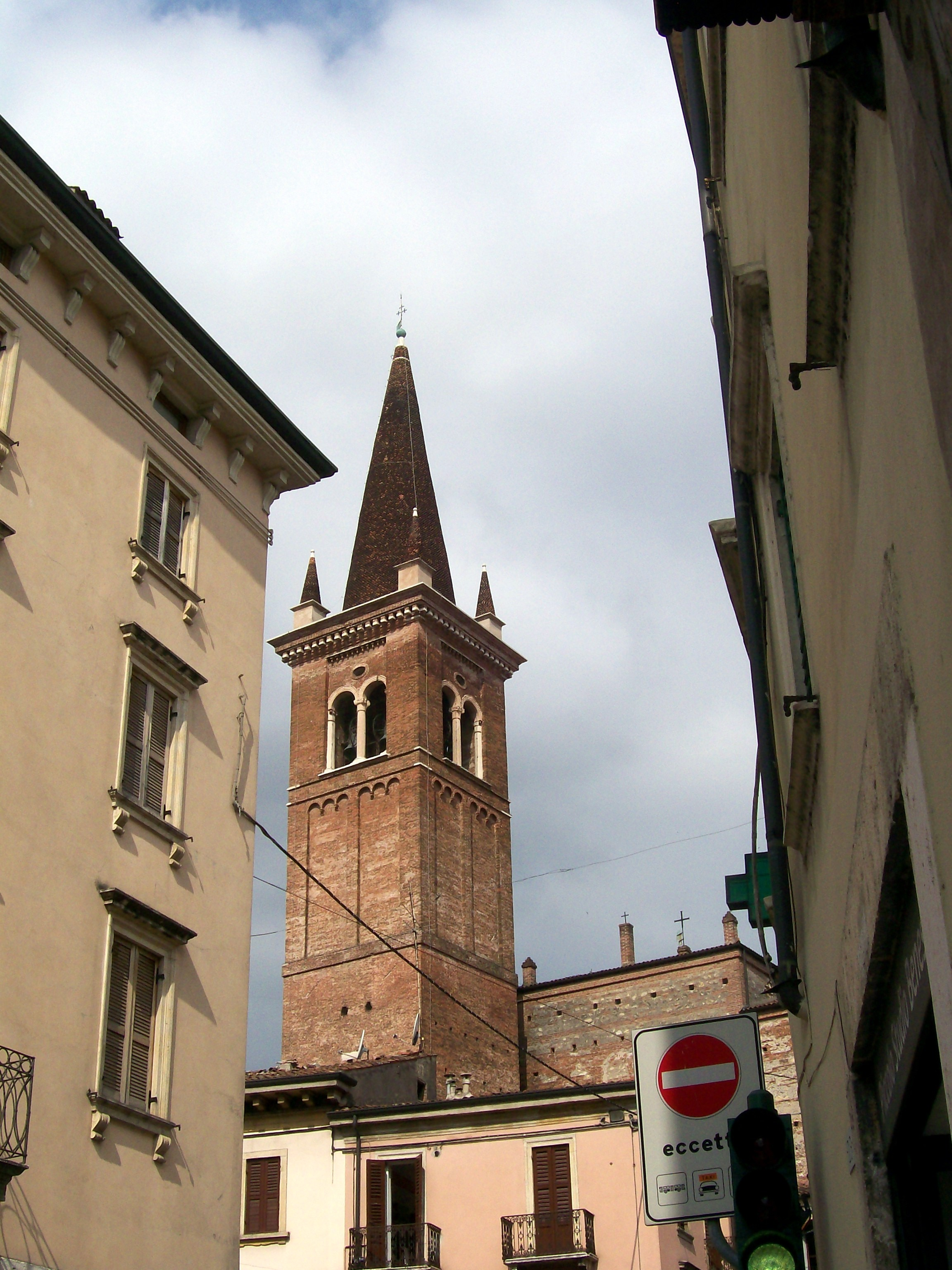
San Tomaso

In the 1914 some of the young ringers of San Giorgio decided to form their own group directed by Sancassani in Santo Stefano and San Tommaso churches, giving themselves the name "Audace" (which means the "Brave"). Ten years later the players of San Giorgio and those of San Paolo united and renamed the group "Società Campanaria Santa Anastasia in Verona", as the tower increased the number of bells from 6 to 9. The new president was Mario Carregari (1911–1997). During this time, the Audace group was able to transfer to the cathedral assuming the name of the church. At the same time as the first world war, they started a thirty-year rivalry between the two groups. The only un-warlike group was the Santi Apostoli who didn't last very long.

This rivalry had the positive effect of leading to further installations: San Leonardo, the imposing San Nicolò all'Arena, Filippini, San Luca, Misericordia, and the cathedral. The cathedral has nine bells in the major scale the biggest of which now weighs 88 long cwt 1 qr 26 lb (9,910 lb or 4,495 kg). The bell is the largest bell hung for full circle ringing in the world and with its 3 long tons (3.0 t) headstock the rotating mass is over 8 long tons (8.1 t). The tower of San Tommaso all'Isolo was the first in the region to have ten bells.

The rivalry was all the more intense because in each team there were the most important men, directors, composers, players, maintenance workers, and experts in bells. The battle was also fought with sheet music composition, creating new sounds, pauses, chords and triplets. The company of the teacher Sancassani, more or less, was the winner of the long conflict, but the turbulent spirit of the Audace team didn't leave the members, even if there weren't any more young people. The arguments changed by the day: an unsuccessful competition, disagreement about the management of the money, a proposal made to the other team, a social office not renewed. Every little thing created disagreement because the team was made up of players from San Michele, Tomba, Cà di David, Montorio and San Massimo. From this society, managed by Accordini and Biondani, other groups were created: the Santo Stefano, the Santa Maria in Organo (called the "Rebel") and the team of Sabaini-S.Eufemia which stopped spontaneously.

During the second world war some of the Veronese bells were destroyed. When the players returned home they all decided to join together with the old San Giorgio team (now Santa Anastasia). Fortunately they were able to give demonstrations in documentaries and exhibitions all over Italy and enjoy the popularity. After the war they gave a bell ringing concert in Borgo Nuovo, Santa Toscana, Tombetta, Palazzina, Golosine, San Giuseppe fuori Le Mura and Borgo Trieste.

Since the fifties, modernity has taken control of Verona lifestyle and the society started to lose interest in church and in bellringing art. It was fashionable for priests to ring the bells electrically which prevented the players from continuing their tradition. In 1983, the creation of a regional bell ringing association managed to gradually turn around the decline, but not in the city of Verona itself, where the downwards trend continued for another twenty years.

== Bellringing today ==
In 1998 the ringing school of St. George was re-opened and in 2010 an event, that had always been dreamed of, took place. The ringers of the city and the suburbs wanted to unite to create a single group (which was the project of M° Sancassani ninety years before), who apart from ringing decided to look together for new members and for a major publicization of the art. A lot of energy was invested in historical, technical, scientific research and the restoring of disused bell towers.

The old San Giorgio society which had been renamed Santa Anastasia after the first world war now incorporated other teams and changed the name to Scuola Campanaria Verona in S.Anastasia (Bellringing school of Verona based in S.Anastasia church). In the Veneto region there are about 2,500 bell ringers of the Veronese method, united in local teams, more than half of which are members of the "Associazone Suonatori di Campane a Systema Veronese" (ASCSV) or association of bell ringers of the Veronese method.

Today new technologically advanced systems, allow the possibility of playing the bells both electrically and manually. However many bell towers have not yet installed the new system and are obliged to continue to use the old electric only system. The electric system needs very expensive maintenance and can damage the towers.

== Bells ==
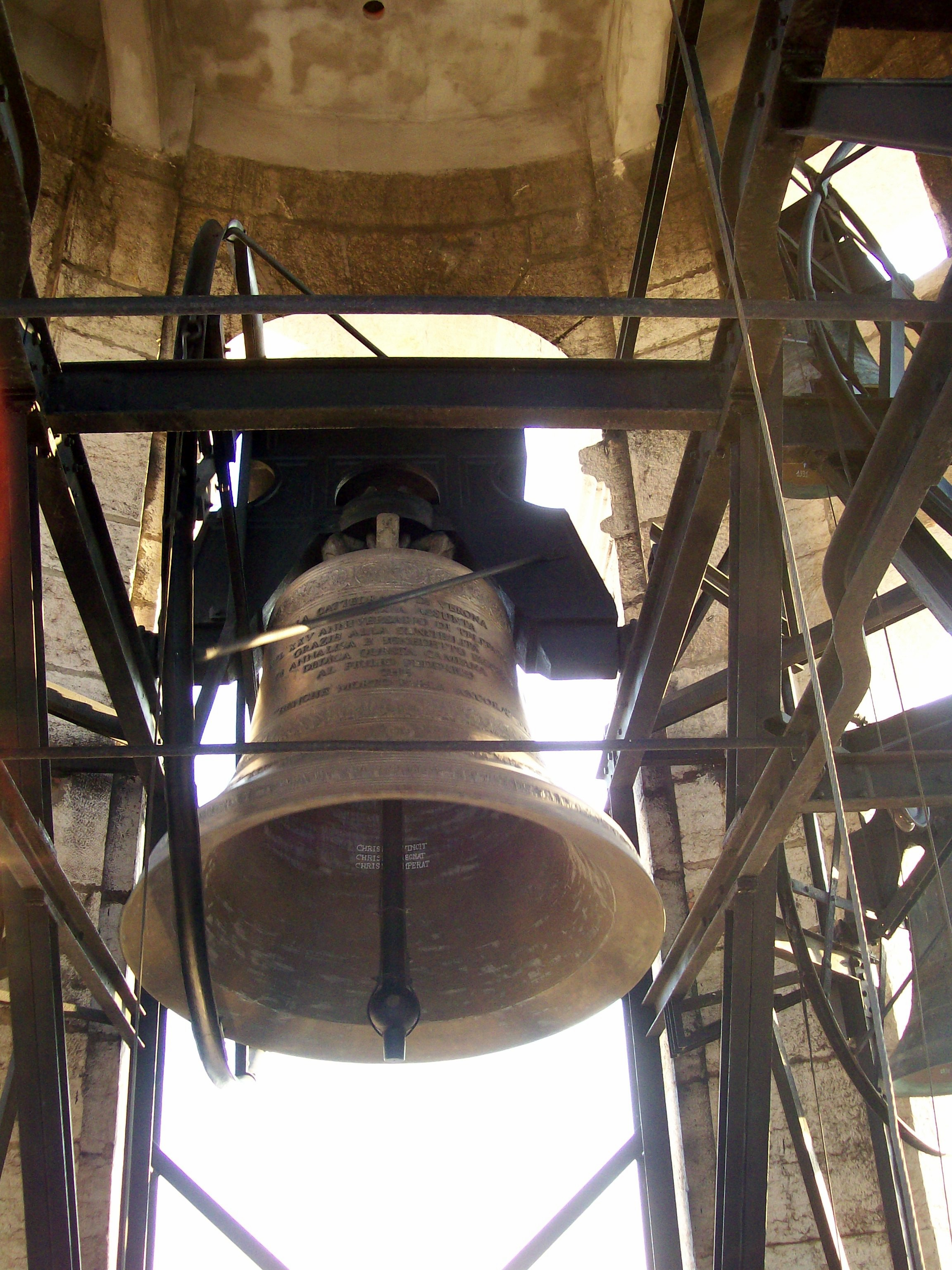
The great bell of the new ring in Verona Cathedral. Cast in 2003 it weighs 4566 kg and is the largest bell in the world hung for full circle ringing.

The bells are cast from 75% copper and 25% tin bell metal using traditional methods of a loam covered core and outer cope. Complex decoration of a religious nature is applied to the mould.

The towers are tall with the bells installed at the top. The bells may swing through the tower openings and the sound is much louder than enclosed bell chambers. The clappers are wired on with a safety rope to prevent a broken or detached clapper from becoming a missile in the streets surrounding the tower. A heavy counterbalanced headstock reduces the forces on the tower and leads to a slower turning bell. The headstock carries a steel wheel with the rope attached at 3 o'clock rather than the higher 2 o'clock attachment in the English style. No stays or sliders are supplied, the bell must be held at balance when not ringing. The rope is steel which removes the problem of stretch when the bells are rung from ground floor ringing chambers. Being less flexible than natural fibres, the steel rope is attached to the wheel with a toggle mechanism rather than being led through a garter hole. The rope is terminated in a natural hemp rope where it is handled. The ropes are plain without the sally associated with English style hanging.

Since the bells are called according to music, the ringers do not need to see each other as a circle. The ropes therefore fall wherever is most convenient for the bell hangers.

== Performances ==
Since there is no provision for the bells to be retained in the up position, each piece or concerto starts with the bells being raised. The bells are either raised sequentially with each bell joining the rounds in turn, or just pulled up all at once.

The Maestro, or conductor, calls out each bell or bells to ring. The Maestro does not handle a bell and will read from music. They play slowly moving tunes, not the continuous change ringing of the English tradition. The Maestro calls out the bells, including two and three bell chords. Each bell uses whichever stroke is available, the ringers holding the bells on balance when not required. The concerto ends with a flourish of chords. Once the concerto is complete, the bells are rung down all at the same time, sometimes with the ringers leaving the tower whilst the bells sort themselves out.
