= Santissima Trinità, Verona =

Church building in Verona, Italy

Coordinates: 45.4335°N 10.9931°E

The Church of the Santissima Trinità (Chiesa della Santissima Trinità) is a Romanesque style, Roman Catholic church in Verona, region of Veneto, Italy.

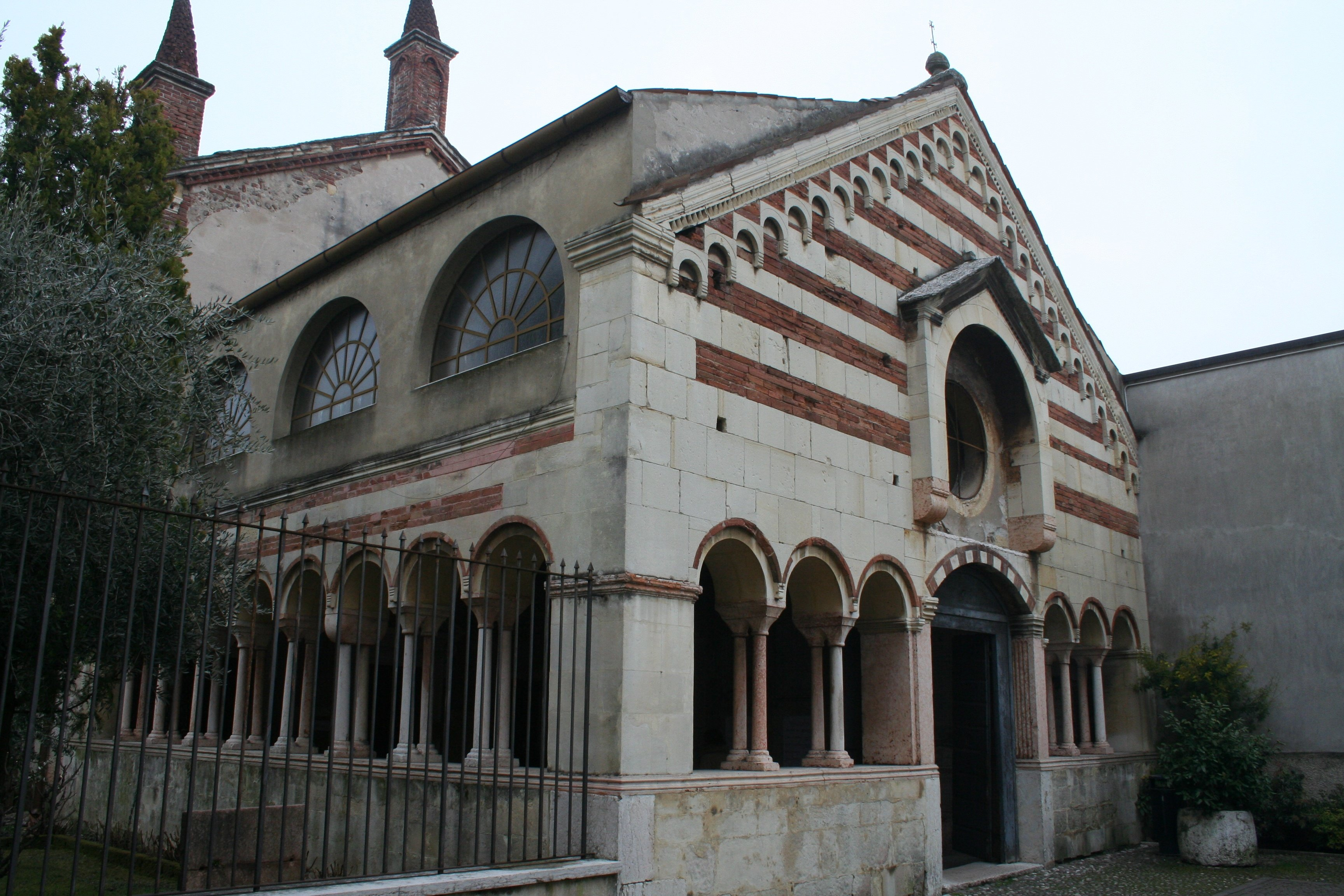
Sixteenth century atrium entrance

== History ==
A church at this site was built in 1073 by Benedictine order Vallombrosan monks at the site of a previous religious temple. The monks were patronized by Matilde di Canossa and Fulcone d'Este. In 1117, the church was dedicated to the Holy Trinity, but that same year, an earthquake devastated the town and required extensive reconstruction for both the church and monastery. The church was made a parish church in 1336, it was enlarged in the 16th-century with the addition of an atrium and a Loggia delle Convertite. By the 1441, the abbey was abandoned by the Vallombrosans, and by 1536, it had become a prison. During the 19th century, the church fell into ruin. The adjacent cloister was partially razed in the early 19th-century, and during the 19th century, the church was attached to initially Salesian nuns, then the order of Stimatini. The cloisters and the Chapel of the House of Loreto were also destroyed in the aerial bombardment of April 6, 1945.

The original facade, seen inside the narthex reveals the unusual Romanesque construction, mixing stones, mortar, and brick, in alternating layers. At the rear of the church, the tall square belltower, also striped with stone and brick, has three arched windows near the roofline, and the roof is cone with three corner pinnacles. The belltower was built under the patronage of Viviano Bevilacqua. The church has a Latin layout and a semicircular choir and two chapels serving as transepts. The belltower contains six bells in F#, cast in 1803 and hung for Veronese bellringing art.

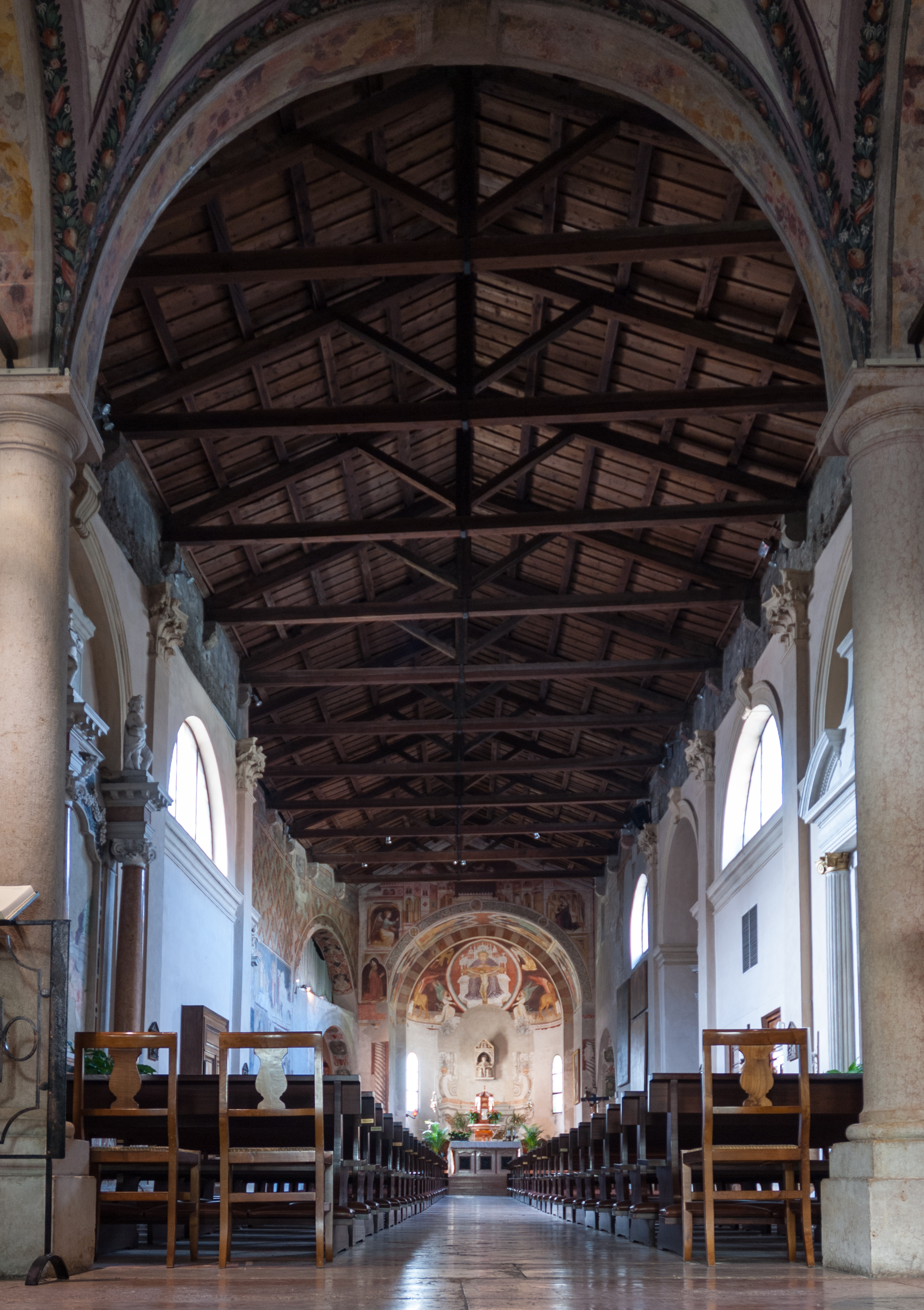
Interiors

Among the main works: a sculpture of the Trinity by Enrico di Rigino; a Trinità in maestà; an Annunciation by Martino da Verona; Apostles by Giacomo da Verona, and frescoes by the Brusasorzi; canvases by Jacopo Ligozzi, Domenico and Felice Brusasorzi, and Giovanni Battista Caliari.
