= Emanuela Guidoboni =

Italian historical seismologist (born 1946)

Emanuela Guidoboni (born 1946) is a retired Italian historical seismologist and historical geographer, formerly a research manager at the Italian National Institute of Geophysics and Volcanology (INGV). Her research through historical documents has found records of hundreds of earthquakes over the last two millennia in Italy.

== Education and career ==
Guidoboni studied medieval history and historical geography at the University of Bologna under the supervision of Vito Fumagalli and Lucio Gambi, with additional study in archiving and paleography at the State Archives of Bologna and in medieval archaeology at the University of Warsaw.

After continued research at the University of Bologna, she founded and became director of the private research company Storia Geofisica Ambiente in Bologna from 1983 to 2007. She retired from this position in 2007, but continued working from 2007 to 2011 as a research manager for the National Institute of Geophysics and Volcanology.

== Recognition ==
Guidoboni was elected to Academia Europaea in 2004.

== Books ==
Guidoboni is a coauthor of:

- Quand la terre tremble (with Jean-Paul Poirier, Odile Jacob Sciences, 2004)
- Earthquakes and Tsunamis in the Past: A Guide to Techniques in Historical Seismology (with John E. Ebel, Cambridge University Press, 2009)
- Storia culturale del terremoto dal mondo antico a oggi (with Jean-Paul Poirier, Rubbettino, 2019)
