= Santi Apostoli, Verona =

Church in Verona, Italy

Coordinates: 45.4408°N 10.9927°E

Santi Apostoli, and the adjacent Romanesque style, small church (chiesetta) or chapel of the Sante Teuteria e Tosca (Female Saints Teuteria and Tosca), is an ancient Roman Catholic church in front of a piazza off Corso Cavour, in central Verona, region of Veneto, Italy.

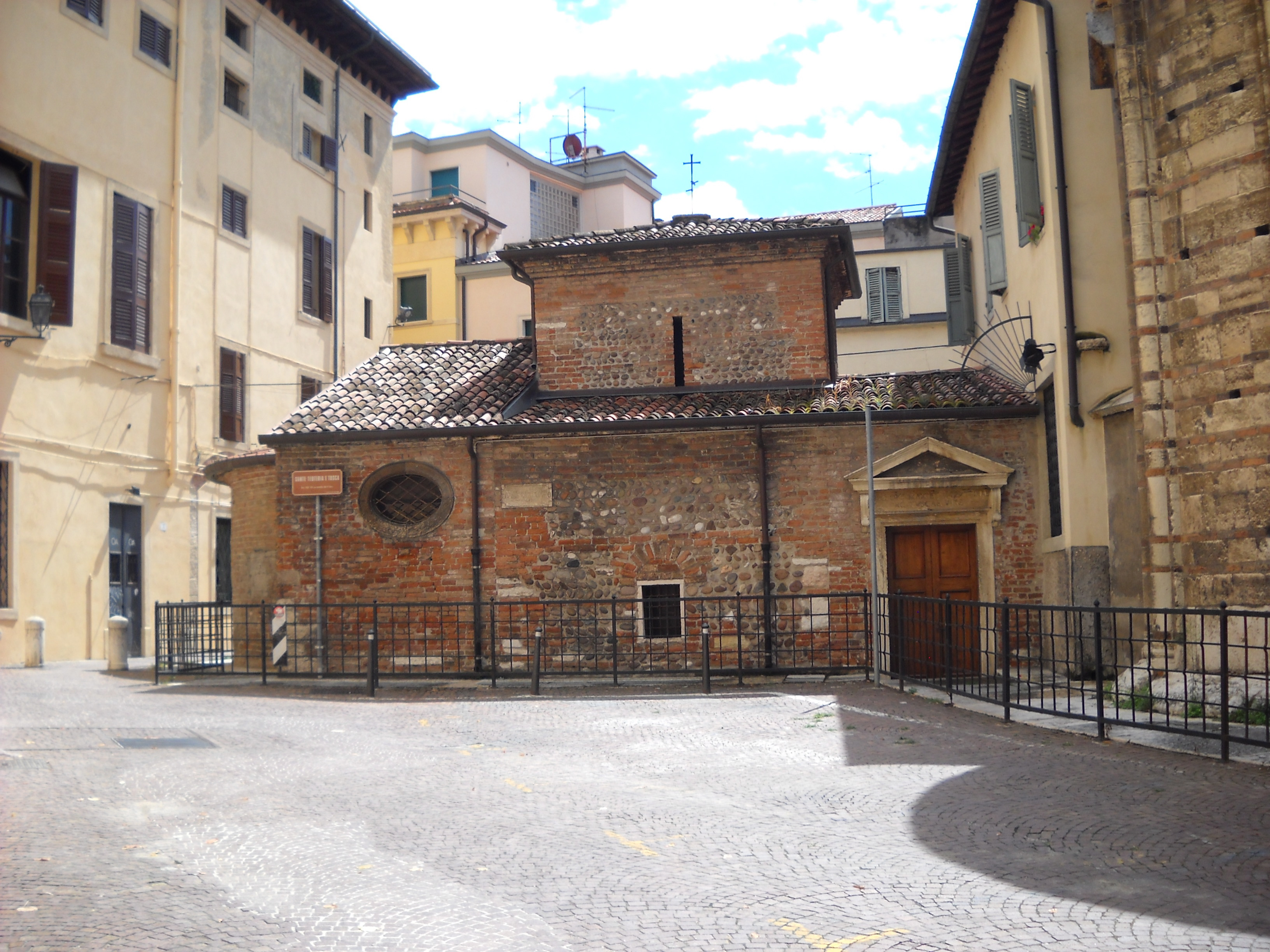
Small church of Sante Teuteria e Tosca

== History ==
A church at this site of the Chiesetta was consecrated in 751 on an earlier fifth-century structure, but reconstructed in the 12th century. Reconstruction of this and Santi Apostoli were pursued across the centuries including major ones in the 18th and 20th-centuries. Over the 18th and 19th century, the Chiesetta was linked to the larger church of Santi Apostoli, converting into almost a chapel. In the 19th-centuries, restorations aimed to re-display the earlier construction, and remove latter accretions. The latter reconstruction addressed damage from bombardments during the war. Of the original Romanesque architecture only some of the walls, the apse, and the tall pale brick and stone, bell-tower remain. The tower contains six bells in scale of Ab, cast in 1817 and still ringing in Veronese bellringing art.

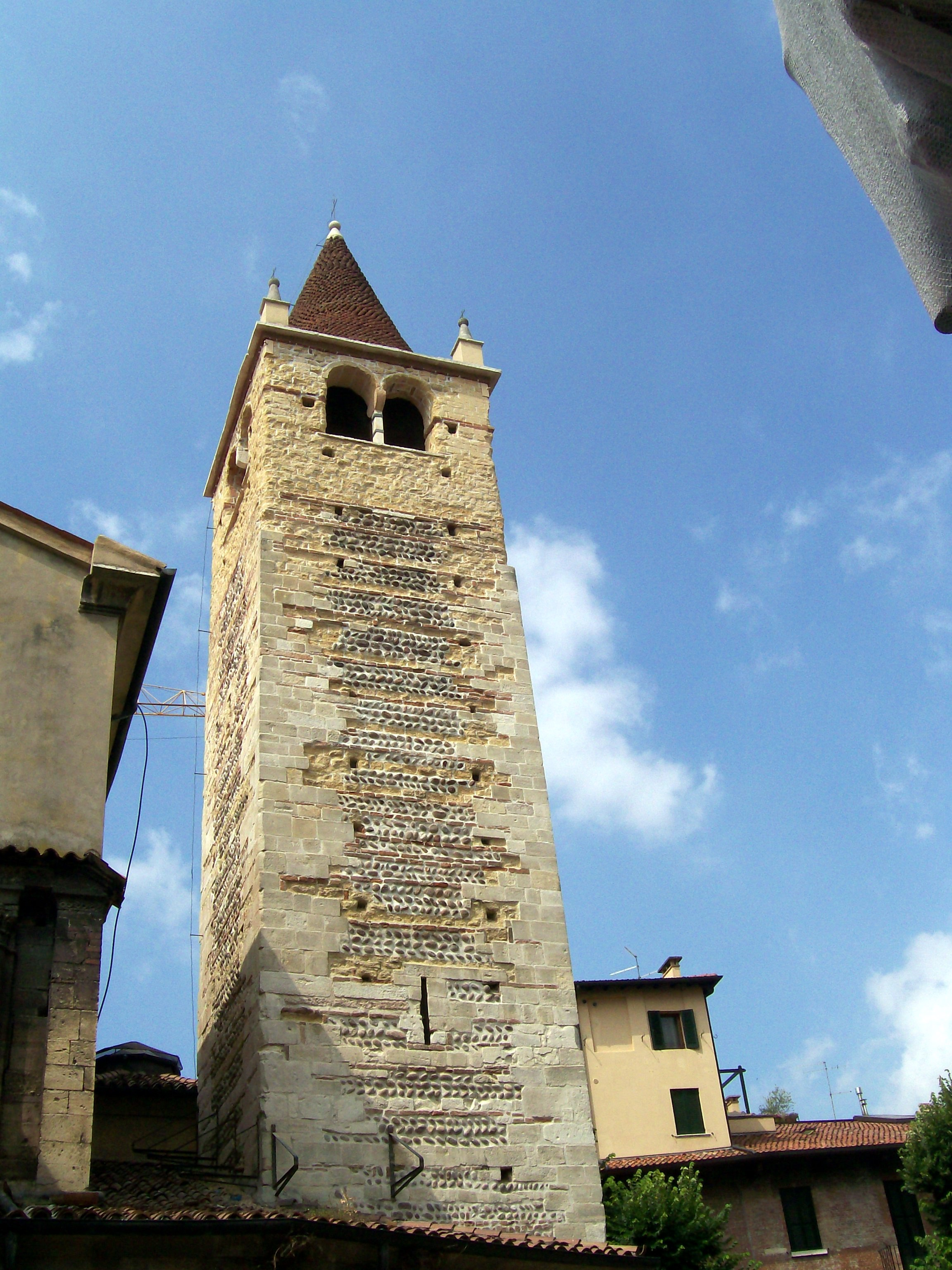
Belltower

The interior was reduced from three to one nave in the 1500s. Through the sacristy, one can enter the partially subterranean brick chapel of Sante Teuteria e Tosca, located on the north side of the church. The cult of these saints, whose biographies are poorly documented, developed around 1160, when the relics of the saints were discovered and entombed in a marble ark. The medieval ark is now present atop the Baroque main altar; reliefs on the ark date from 1428.

To the right of the altar is the tomb (1368) of Francesco Bevilacqua. A marble monument for three brothers of the Bevilacqua was added in the 16th century. The urn has sculpted images of the three theologic virtues.
