= Libri =

Libri may refer to:

== People ==
- Domenico Libri, an Italian criminal
- Girolamo dai Libri, an Italian illuminator
- Francesco dai Libri, an Italian illuminator, father of Girolamo dai Libri
- Guglielmo Libri Carucci dalla Sommaja, a 19th-century Italian count and infamous book thief

== Books ==
- Libri Carolini, composed on the command of Charlemagne
- Libri Feudorum, a twelfth-century collection, originating in Lombardy, of feudal customs
- Libri of Aleister Crowley is a list of texts mostly written or adapted by Aleister Crowley

== Other ==
- Libri Prohibiti, a nonprofit, private, independent, archival research library located in Prague, Czech Republic
- Libri (journal), an academic journal of library science and information studies
- Libri, a book store in Hungary.

== See also ==
- Libris (disambiguation)
