= Libris =

Libris or LIBRIS may refer to:

- LIBRIS, the Swedish national union catalogue
- Libris Prize, a prize for novels originally written in Dutch
- Libris History Prize, a Dutch literary history prize
- Libris Award, a prize for Canadian literature

== See also ==
- Libri (disambiguation)
- Ex Libris (disambiguation)
