= San Paolo in Campo Marzio, Verona =

Church building in Verona, Italy

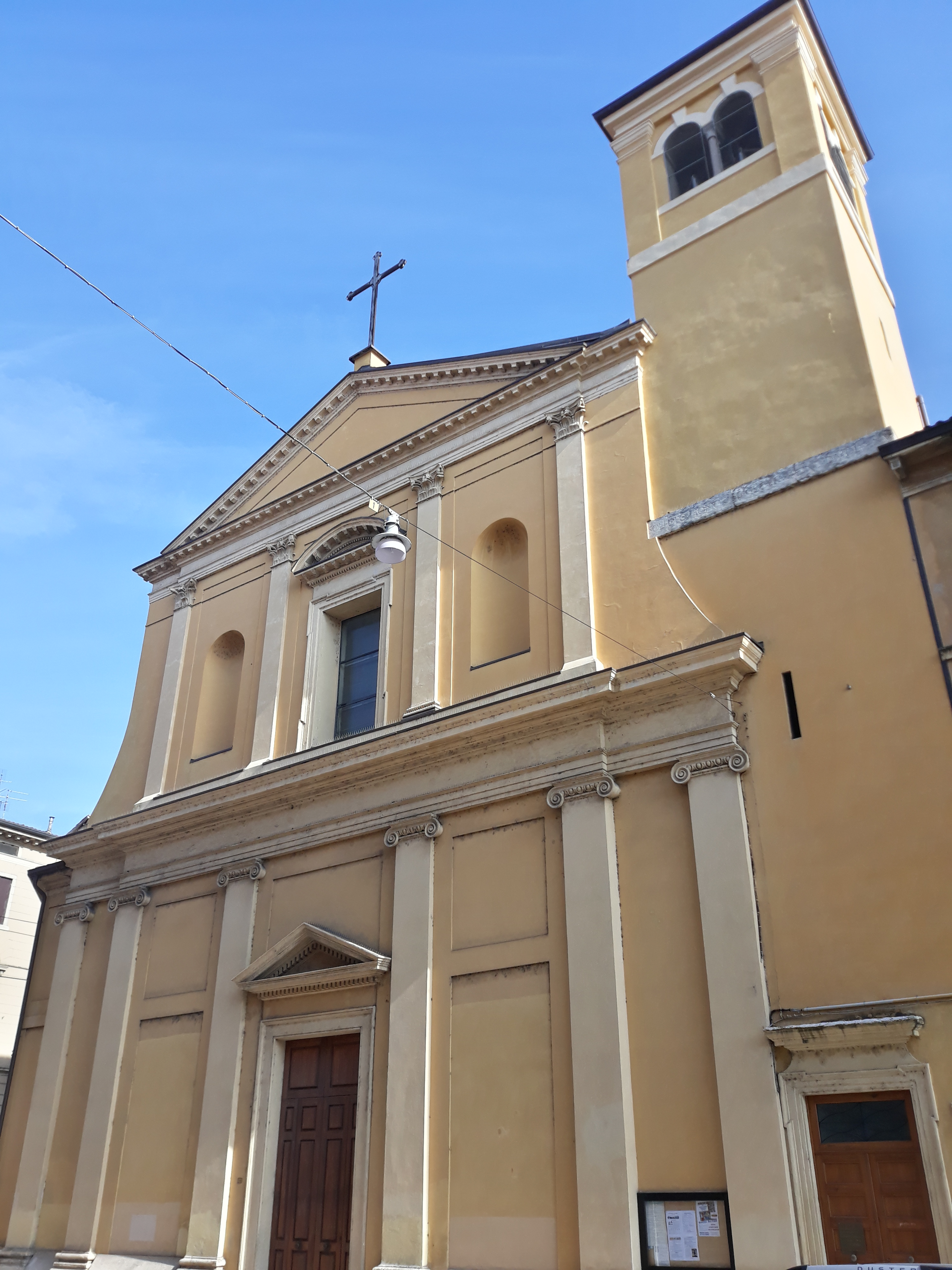

San Paolo in Campo Marzio is a Roman Catholic church in Verona, region of Veneto, Italy.

== History ==
The church was originally built by the Umiliati order in 1188 and dedicated to St Paul Apostle. It was refashioned in 1763 by Alessandro Pompei. In 1948, after much damage during World War II, it again was rebuilt. The second altar on the right has a canvas depicting Saints Anne, Joseph, Young John the Baptist before the Madonna with two donors by Girolamo dai Libri. In the Marogna chapel near the presbytery, are frescoes by Paolo Farinati and an altarpiece depicting the Madonna, John the Baptist, and St Anthony of Padua with two donors of the Marogna family (circa 1565) by Paolo Veronese. The apse has a painting depicting the Madonna with Saints Peter and Paul (1516) by Giovanni Caroto. The fourth altar on the left has a canvas depicting St Francis of Paola by Felice Brusasorci. The second altar on the left has a canvas depicting the Madonna in glory with Saints Nicolò and Francis (1588) by Paolo Farinati. In the sacristy is a canvas depicting the Madonna with St Anthony Abbot and Mary Magdalen by Francesco Bonsignori.
