= San Tomaso Becket, Verona =

Catholic church in Verona, Italy

Church of San Tomaso Becket
- Chiesa di San Tomaso Becket; Chiesa di San Tomaso Cantuariense
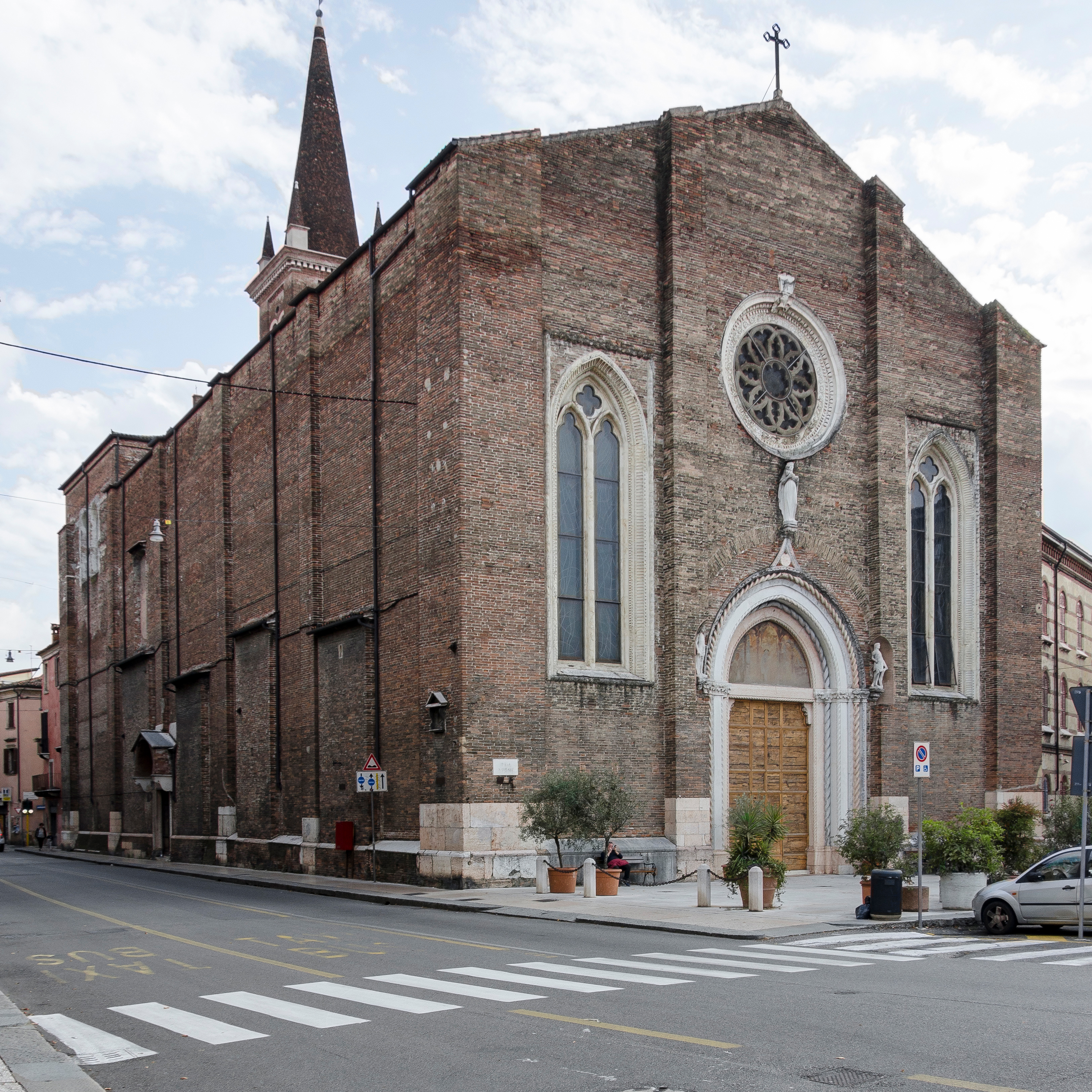
- Façade and side elevation of the church
- Church of San Tomaso Becket
- Location: Verona, Veneto, Italy
- Denomination: Catholic

History
- Dedication: Thomas Becket
- Consecrated: 1504

Architecture
- Style: Gothic (exterior) and Renaissance (interior)
- Groundbreaking: 14th century
- Completed: 16th century

Administration
- Diocese: Roman Catholic Diocese of Verona

The Church of San Tomaso Becket, better known as the Church of San Tomaso Cantuariense, is a Catholic place of worship located near the historic center of Verona, just across the Ponte Nuovo del Popolo. It is dedicated to the English saint Thomas Becket, who was murdered in 1170 because of his aversion to Henry II of England.

During the Late Middle Ages there were two churches in the area: one, older, dedicated to Thomas Becket, the second dedicated to the Virgin Annunciate and next to which stood a Benedictine monastery. In the early 15th century, the Carmelites decided to proceed with the expansion of the second one, thus laying the foundation for the present building, which would take its name from the one of St. Thomas, which was torn down. According to an inscription on the facade, construction began around 1449, continuing, not without financial difficulties, until 1504, the year of its consecration. With the arrival of Napoleon the church was used as an infirmary for French troops, and in 1805 the convent was finally suppressed. Under subsequent Austrian rule the cloister was partially demolished and many of the former convent premises used as a military prison. It was necessary to wait for the annexation of Veneto to Italy before the church could be reopened for worship.

The present building looks like a combination of traditional Veronese Romanesque and late Gothic. The exterior features an austere facade with a circular rose window and a wide portal, the latter, it is assumed, coming from another building. The interior has a single nave and the pavement consists of red and white squares with the exception of the chancel, while the ceiling is covered with wooden trusses. On the interior side walls of the nave are two burial monuments sculpted by Ugo Zannoni and eight altars set in Renaissance arches. Numerous works of art are preserved that were created by famous painters from Verona, including Paolo Farinati, Girolamo dai Libri, Alessandro Turchi, and Antonio Balestra.

== History ==
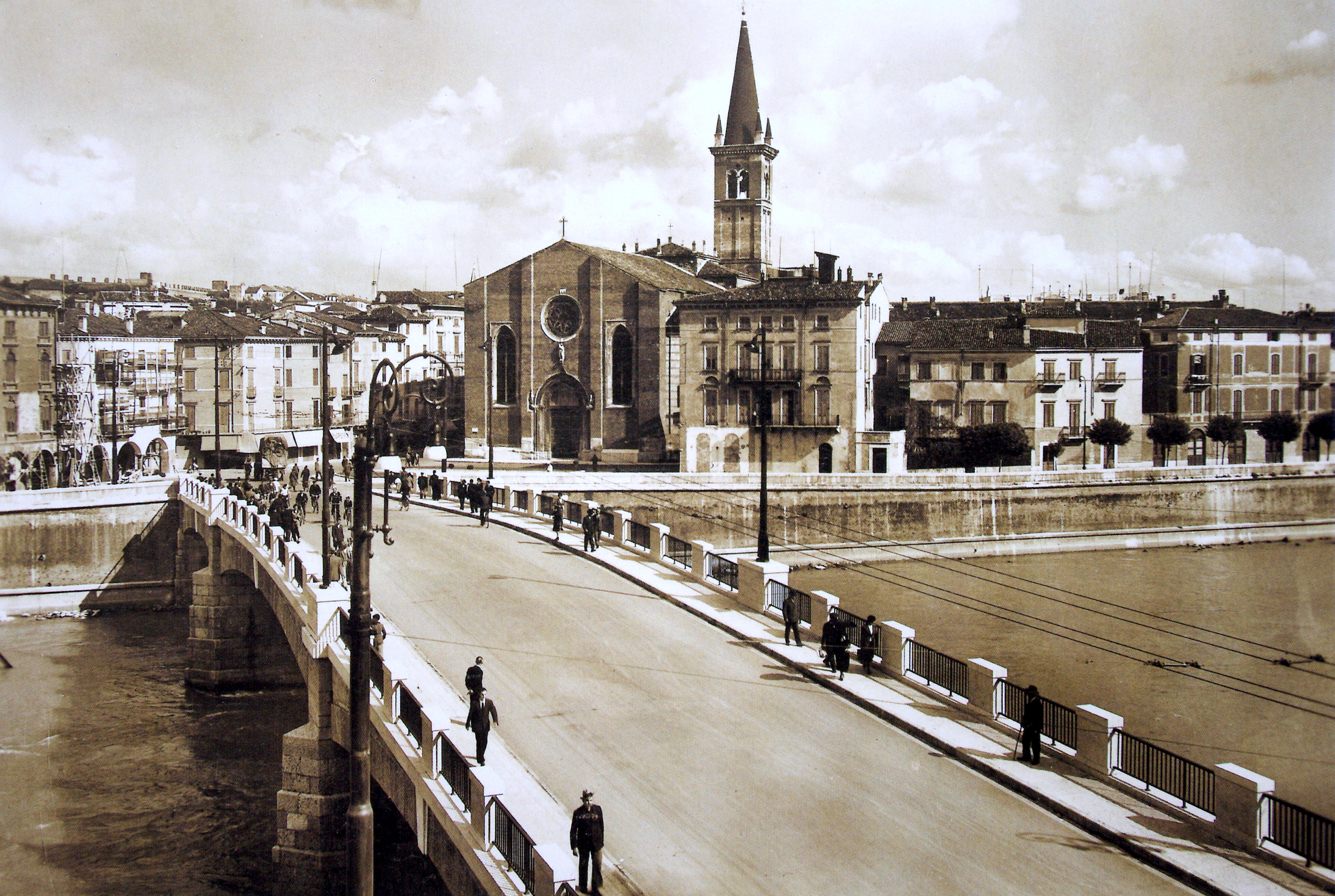
The church of San Tomaso Cantuariense as it was in 1940.

An 8th-century document (Note: The 8th-century document speaks of a “monasterium Sancti Thome cuit vocapulo est pineolo” initially identified as the early church but later believed to be a monastery located in the hamlet of Coriano in Albaredo d'Adige and dedicated to St. Thomas the Apostle. In Fabbri (2008, p. 12).) has long suggested that a primitive early Christian church stood on the present site since the early Middle Ages, however, more careful studies have challenged this theory. For the first certain mention of a religious building in the area, one must rely on a papal bull issued in 1185 by Pope Lucius III in which reference is made to “unam capellam Sancti Thomae in Insula veronensi sitam,” that is, of a chapel dedicated to St. Thomas and located in the Isolo of Verona. The "Isolo" is an area of the city that was once located between the bed of the Adige River and one of its secondary canals thus making it a true island; with the construction of the walls on the Adige following the flood of 1882, the secondary canal was interrupted and drained and thus the Isolo ceased to exist. The St. Thomas referred to, however, is Thomas Becket, archbishop of Canterbury who was murdered in the Cathedral in 1170 and proclaimed a saint three years later by Pope Alexander III. The decision to dedicate the building to the English saint was probably due to Bishop Adelard of Verona, his fervent devotee.

Next to this early church also stood a Benedictine monastery dependent on the Abbey of Villanova, located near San Bonifacio. In the early fourteenth century, members of the Order of the Blessed Virgin of Mount Carmel, commonly called Carmelites, settled in the monastery in place of the Benedictines and, on March 5, 1351, obtained permission from Lord Pietro della Scala to build a new church nearby, on land donated by some wealthy citizens of the Isolo, to be dedicated to the Virgin Annunciate.

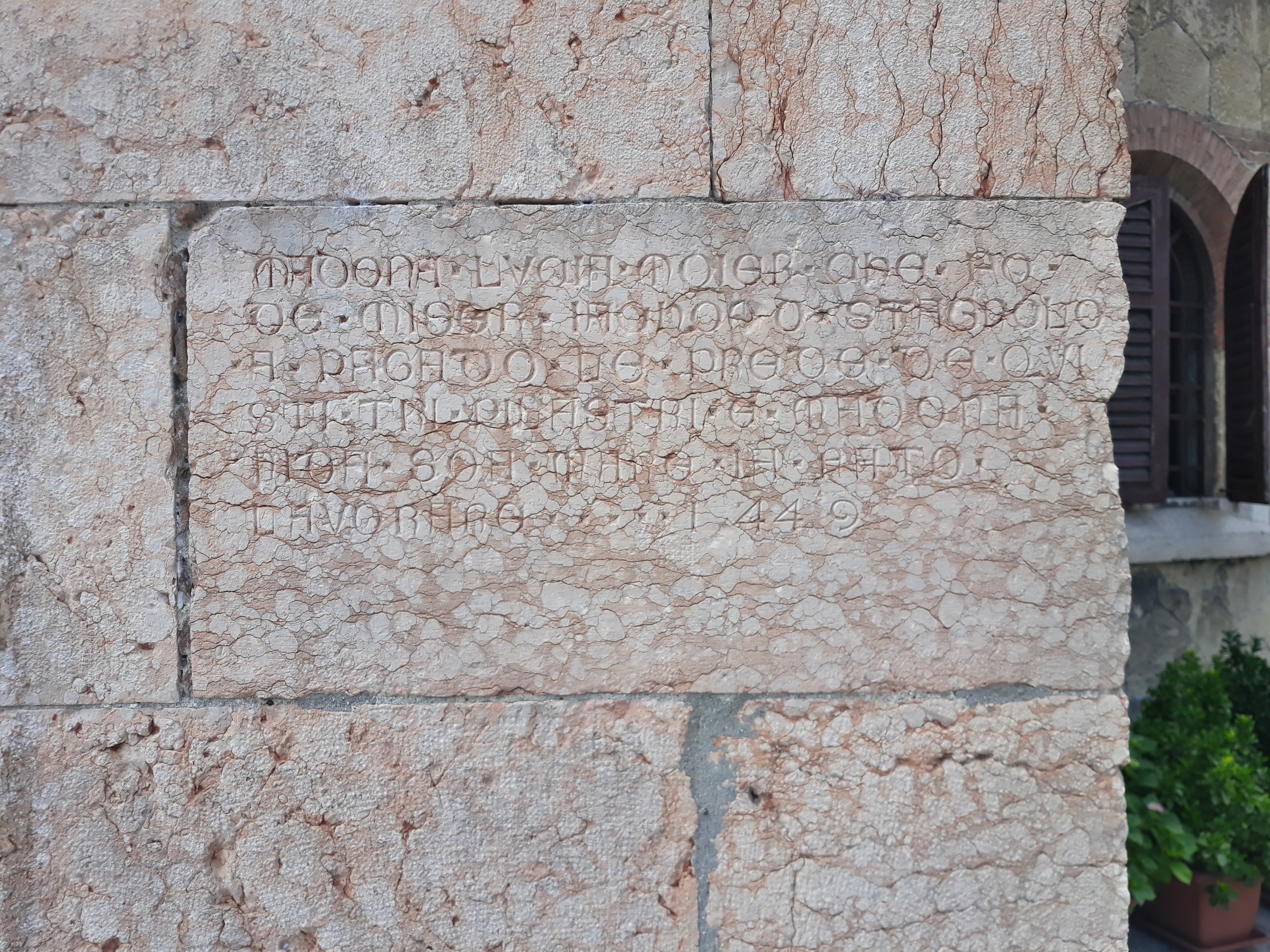
Inscription on the pillar to the right of the facade commemorating the construction of the building

The following decades were, therefore, characterized by the presence of two churches, a situation that lasted until the beginning of the 15th century when it was decided to tear down the older church, that is, the one dedicated to St. Thomas, and to enlarge the later one dedicated instead to the Virgin Annunciate, which would then be the one that survives to this day. Therefore, the present church, although built on the basis of the one that was dedicated to the Virgin Annunciate (and is still officially dedicated to her) is known by the dedication of the earlier and demolished one of St. Thomas. The date of the beginning of construction is dated around 1449, and this information comes from an inscription, relating to the purchase of some stones, engraved in a pillar located to the right of the façade. (Note: The text of the inscription is as follows: "MADONA LUCIA MOIER CHE FO // DE MISER IACHOPO STAGNOLO // A PAGADO LE PREDE DE QUI- // STI TRI PILASTRI E MADONA // NIDA SOA MARE IA FATO // LAVORERE... 1449".) The work did not progress quickly, and the Carmelites, who were in chronic financial difficulty, had to rely on the generosity of the parishioners to cover the costs of the construction. The municipality of Verona also had to share the burden by contributing, beginning in 1487, a sum of eight ducats per year. A private citizen, a certain Jacopo, son of Bongiovanni da Pesena, took charge of the construction of the side door as a testamentary bequest; an inscription on the architrave recalls the fulfillment. (Note: The text of the inscription is as follows: "JACOBUS D BONIOANIS DEPESENA EXEQUENS VOLUNTATEM // PATERNAM ET SE EXONERANS PRESENTEM PORTAM SUIS // SUMPTIBUS FIERI FECEIT ANNO D 146…". In Fabbri (2008, p. 15).) Finally, on September 22, 1504, Marco Corner, apostolic coadjutor, was able to consecrate the new church.

For a long time it was believed that between 1545 and 1550 the Veronese architect Michele Sanmicheli had been entrusted with some plans for the architectural rearrangement of the church, which nevertheless remained on paper, including the division into three naves and the construction of a wide transept. More recent studies, however, have disproved this hypothesis, confirming that the architect was indeed interested in the church, but only spiritually, as this was where his family tomb was located and where he also wished to be buried.

With the arrival of Napoleon's troops in Verona at the end of the 18th century, the church was used as a hospital for French soldiers, and later, in 1805, the convent was finally suppressed. Between 1856 and 1857 the cloister was largely demolished and the remaining parts converted into a sacristy and oratory. At the height of Austrian rule part of these buildings were used as a garrison prison. Shortly after the annexation of Veneto to Italy, the church of San Tomaso was reopened for worship.

== Exterior ==
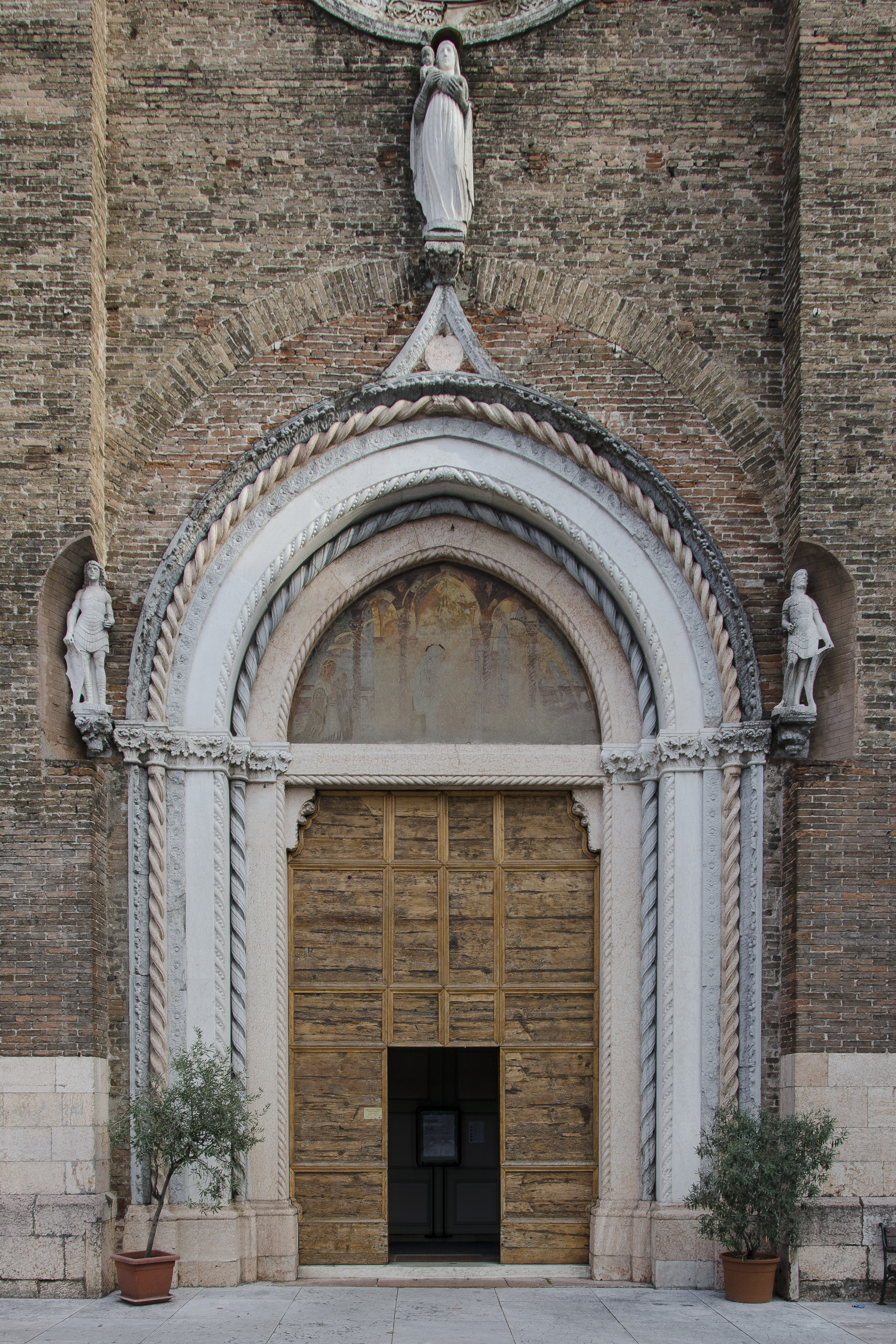
The portal of the church with a lunette crowned by the statue of Mary holding her blessed son.

The gabled facade, which presumably remained unfinished due to the economic difficulties encountered during the building's construction, has a sober and bare appearance. In the center, the wide splayed portal, in late Gothic style, is composed of the main doorway surrounded by finely carved marble frames. The inscription on the entablature, (Note: "DEO M. ET MATRI SEMPER VIRGINI // CHRISTOFORUS FRANCHINUS IURIS DOCCET COMES // EQUESQ SUO ERE ET SPONTE VIVENS DICAVIT // ANNO SALUTIS MCCCCLXXXXIII".) dating from 1493, indicates that the jurist Cristoforo Lanfranchini dedicated it to Christ and the Virgin, suggesting that it was originally placed in another church and then moved there: further evidence of the financial straits that plagued its construction. The lunette contains an Annunciation of Mary by the twentieth-century artist Carlo Donati, which replaced the original attributed to Domenico Brusasorzi, which has been lost. At the top of the portal is a statue of Mary holding her blessed Son, while at the sides two more sculptures are placed in niches carved in the pilasters.

Above the portal, there is a circular rose window inscribed with a series of denticulated, ovoid and spiral decorations reminiscent of the Romanesque style, but in a clearly late Renaissance context.

On the north side there is a door framed by a marble jamb, on the architrave of which there is an inscription that tells how it was built thanks to a donation from a certain Jacopo, who took on this burden in order to respect his father's wishes. Above the architrave, the marble cornice continues, interrupted only by two 15th-century marble capitals, and forms a pointed arch set in a suspended prothyrum. On either side, two large biforas allow light into the interior.

=== Bell tower ===
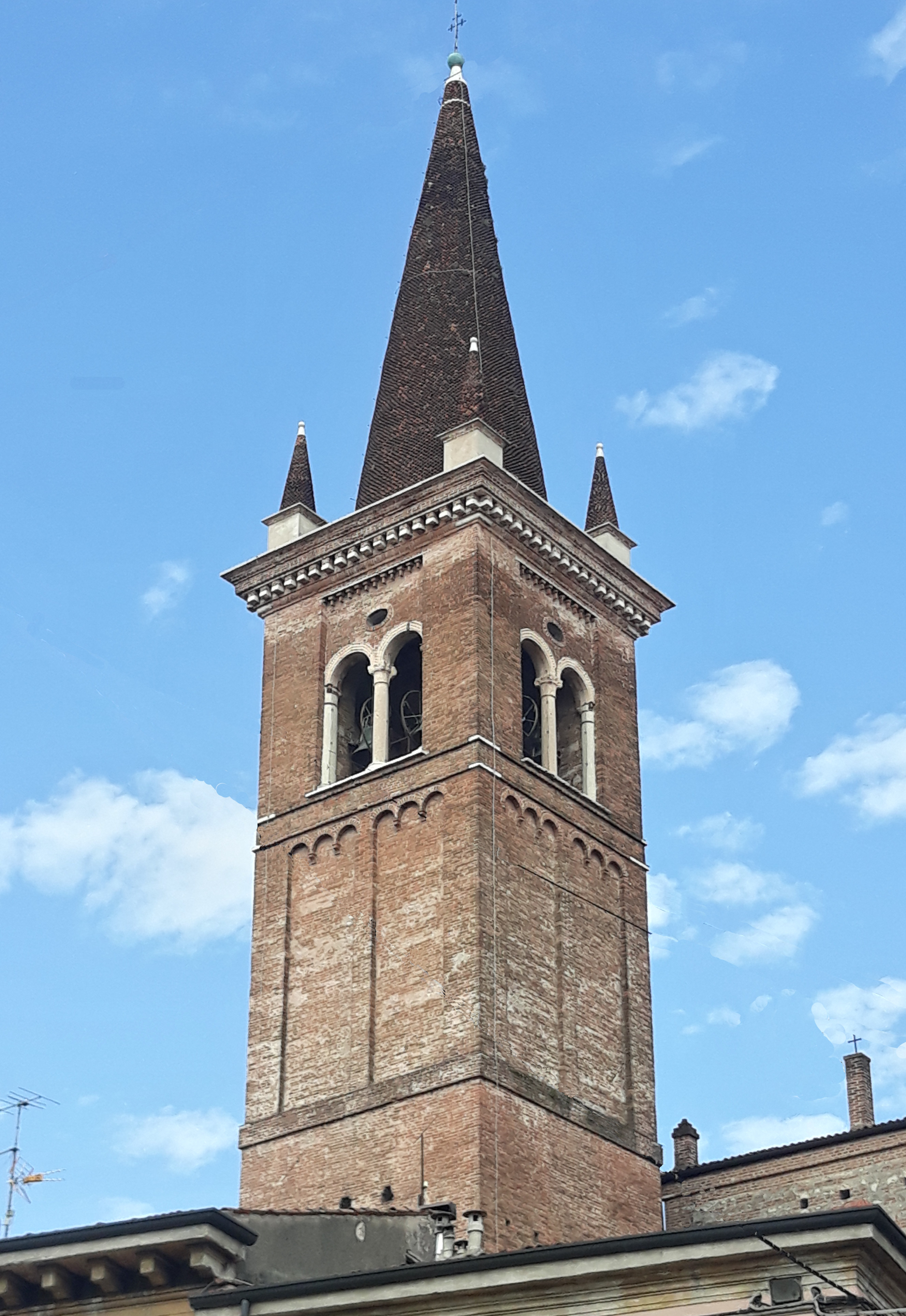
Bell tower of the church

At the same time as the church was built, the bell tower was also erected; it is believed to rest on the base of that of the earlier church dedicated to the Virgin Annunciate. (Note: This can be seen from the plan of the bell tower, which has a different orientation from the church, and therefore it can be assumed that it rests on the base of the bell tower of the former church. In Fabbri (2008, p. 22).) Placed along the right side of the church, it was made of the same material, brick, as the main building. The tower ends with a conical spire that extends 18.4 meters and whose tip reaches the remarkable height of 60 meters. Simple in appearance, it has some Renaissance elements. The shaft is embellished with lesenes placed on the sides and in the center that are connected with Lombard bands. The belfry consists of round-arched biforas made of local pink marble. On the base is, set into the wall, a stone on which an epigraph is carved: “...IUS ECCLESIAE RECTOR... // (F)ECIT MCCCCCCLXXVIII.” (Note: Literally, "...the ecclesiastical rector... made in 1478".)

Housed inside the belfry are ten bells in the scale of D3, cast by the Cavadini firm in 1930, which are rung manually according to the Veronese bell ringing technique. These are renowned for their sound, considered to be precise and melodious, and replace six preceding ones in E3.

== Interior ==
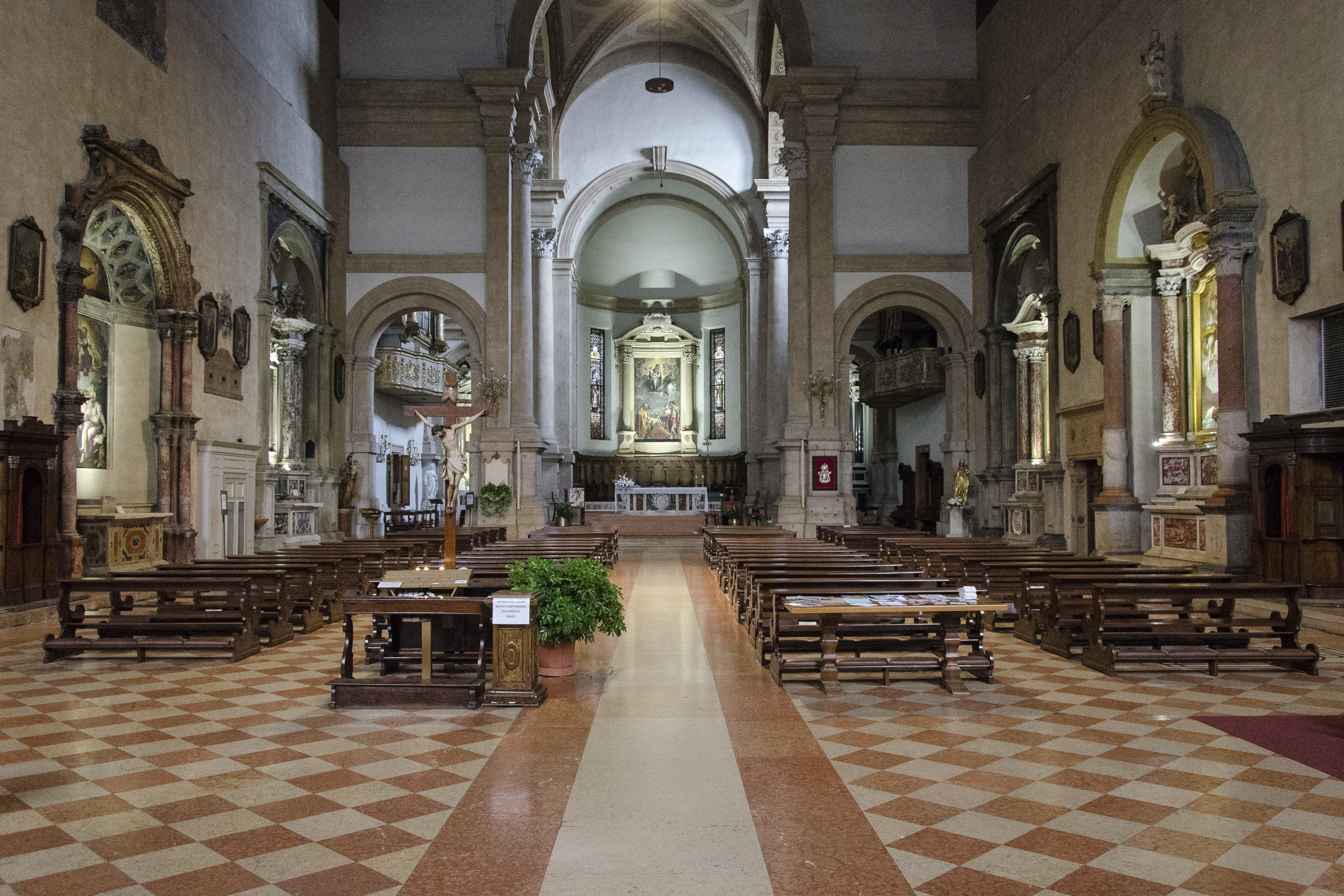
Interior of the church

The interior of the church has a single nave. The flooring is in red and white squares, except for that of the chancel. The ceiling, also paneled, is supported by wooden trusses with two columns. Lateral to the nave are eight Baroque altars, four on the right and four on the left, all set in Renaissance arches. The chancel is separated from the nave by three wide arches, of which the central one is markedly higher than the two side arches. In turn, the chancel is surrounded by four triumphal arches supported by as many columns embellished with Renaissance-style capitals, which are superimposed by large pulvini. A smaller arch marks the beginning of the apse.

=== Right side of the nave ===
At the entrance to the church, from the main doorway following the right side of the nave, there is, inside a niche, a baptismal font, originally made for the nearby church of Santa Maria Rocca Maggiore (now deconsecrated) and brought there after the 17th-century original was sold in 1904.

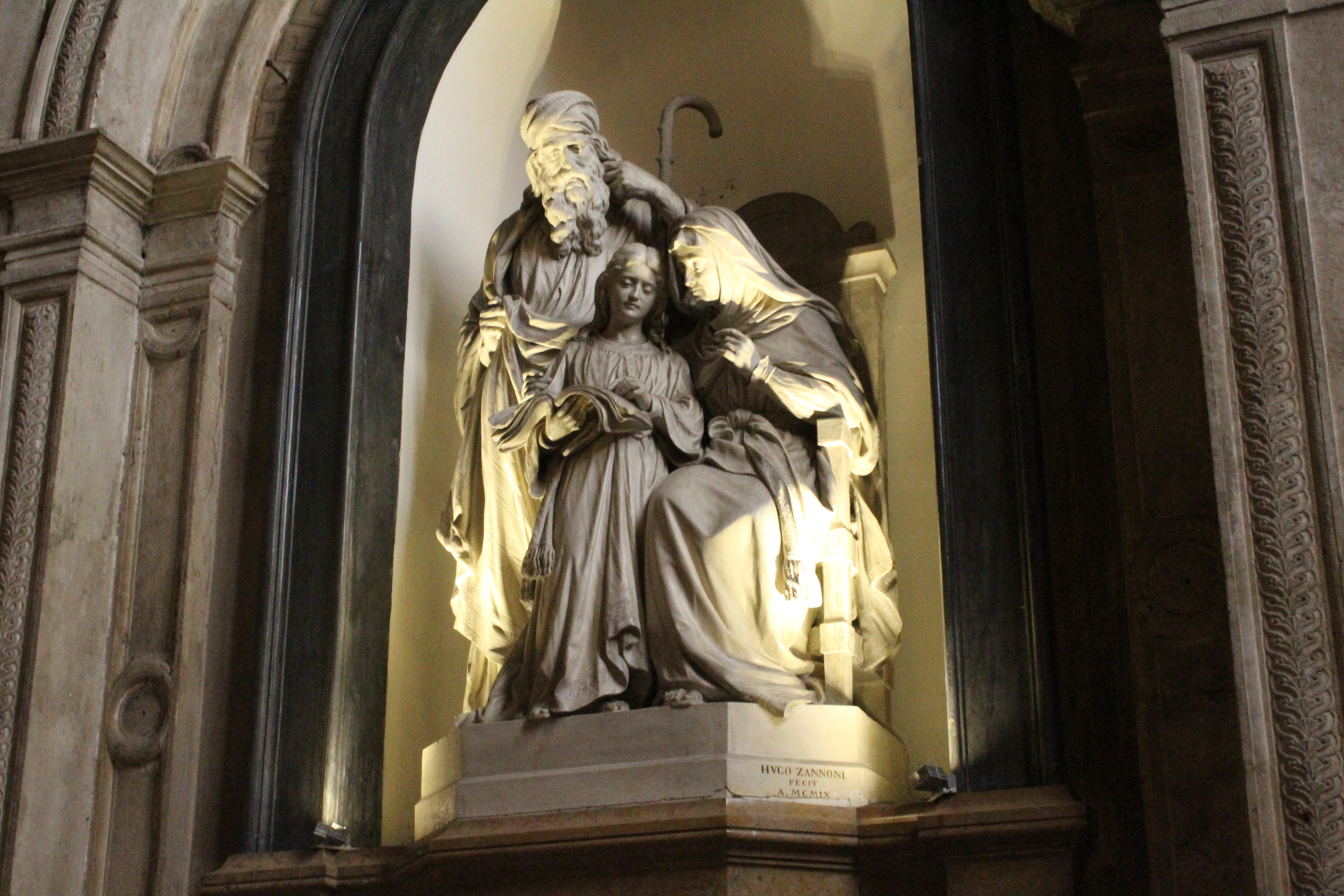
Dolcetti altar, sculptural group by Ugo Zannoni

The first altar one comes across is the one belonging to the Dolcetti family, featuring a statue by Ugo Zannoni in which he depicted St. Joachim, St. Anne and the Virgin reading. However, this sculptural group was placed there only in 1909 to replace an earlier wooden statue of Mary Magdalene (now placed in the nearby altar of the Da Prato family), which, in turn, had taken the place of an altarpiece depicting St. Mary Magdalene de' Pazzi by the Vicenza painter Pietro Bartolomeo Cittadella. Immediately afterwards, also by Ugo Zannoni, the funeral monument of Michele Sanmicheli was inserted into the wall.

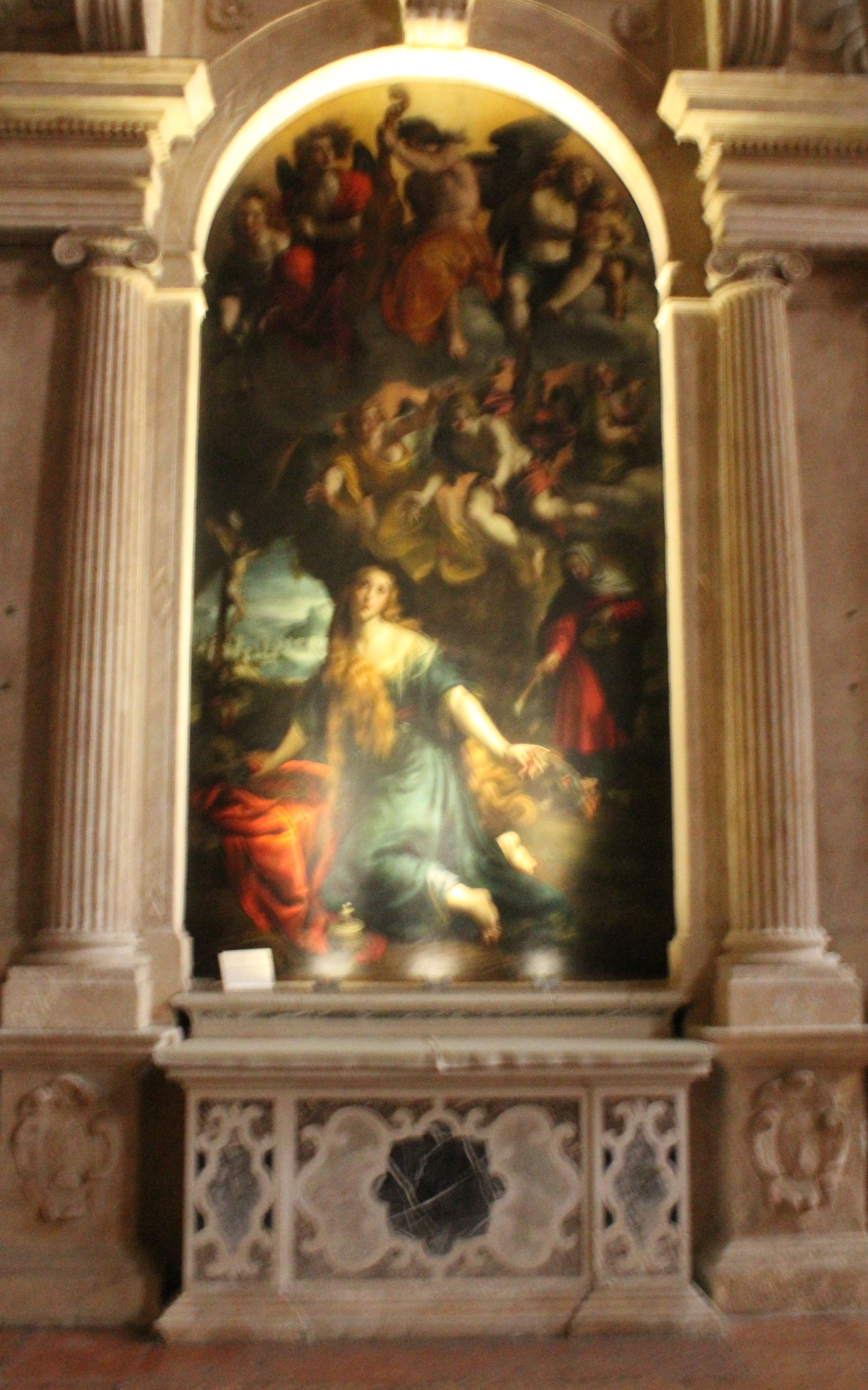
Da Prato altar, altarpiece by Alessandro Turchi

Continuing on, one encounters the Da Prato altar, characterized by a neoclassical-style frame that encloses a Baroque altarpiece, The Ecstasy of St. Mary, commissioned by Giacomo Dal Prato and signed and dated by Alessandro Turchi, (Note: Signed by Alessandro Turchi: "ALEX. TURCHIS. F.A. D. MDCV".) in which one can see the contrast of a bright paradise populated by angels with the gloomy representation of the earthly world where Magdalene is found. On either side of the tympanum are two statues, made between the 19th and 20th centuries, representing angels, while above is the wooden sculpture of Magdalene, once on the Dolcetti altar. At the foot of the altar are the tombs of the patrons: Girolamo da Prato and his brothers Giacomo and Bonifacio.

The next altar, made in 1681 and named the altar of the Annunciate, is decorated with various Baroque elements, such as cherubs, mixtilinear and undulating planes. Two elegant Solomonic columns support an archway. Antonio Balestra is the author of the altarpiece, dated 1702, and also painted God the Father in the upper tondo. At the top is a statue dating from 1736 by Michelangelo Speranza, depicting St. John of Nepomuk, originally placed in the center of the nearby New Bridge and then moved to the church in 1801, when French and Austrian troops, who following the Treaty of Lunéville had partitioned Verona, had barricaded the bridge.

Further on, the altar of the confraternity of San Rocco houses an altarpiece by Girolamo dai Libri depicting Saints Roch, Sebastian and Job. This altar replaced an earlier one from the beginning of the 16th century in 1727. To its left is a statue by an anonymous artist, dated between the 15th and 16th centuries, depicting Our Lady and the Child. Finally, coming from the nearby former church of Santa Maria della Disciplina, is the Orti altar, located on the northern wall next to the chancel. It houses a wooden crucifix by an anonymous author from the late 14th century placed against a background in which the city of Jerusalem is painted, with the gloomy sky amplifying the tragic nature of the scene.

=== Presbytery ===
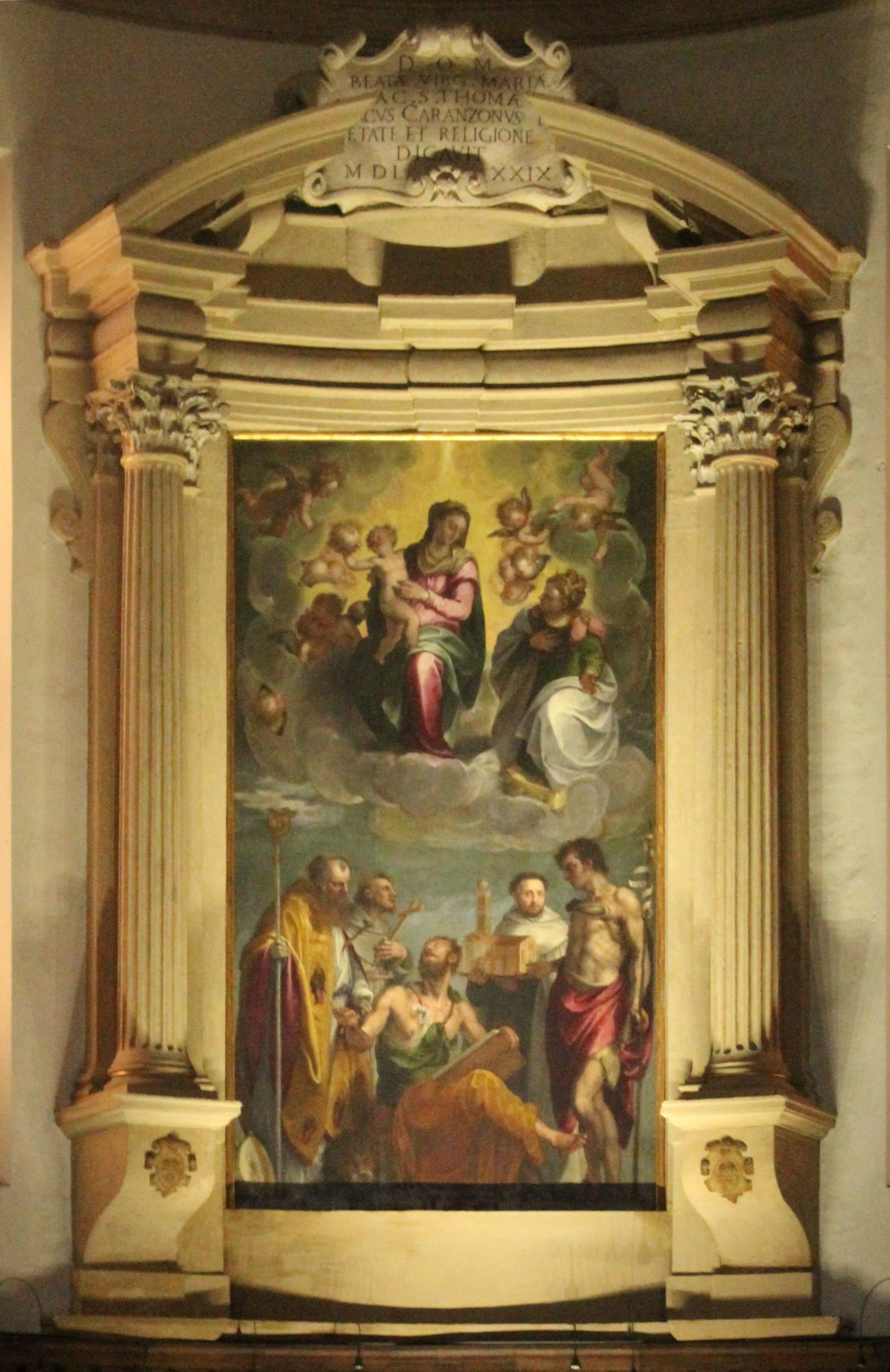
Altarpiece for the high altar by Felice Brusasorzi

The large chancel of the church, accessed by passing a balustrade, houses the high altar made in the 18th century by Giuseppe Antonio Schiavi; of the original, however, only the mensa remains, consisting of an oval in which is carved The Prophet Elijah receiving nourishment from the angel. The altarpiece behind it, dated 1579, is the work of Veronese painter Felice Brusasorzi, who depicted Our Lady with the Child and Saints. Among the figures Brusasorzi painted are St. Thomas Becket (titular of the church), St. Francis, St. Mark, St. John the Baptist, and St. Albert depicted in the act of holding a scale model of the church itself.

=== Left side of the nave ===
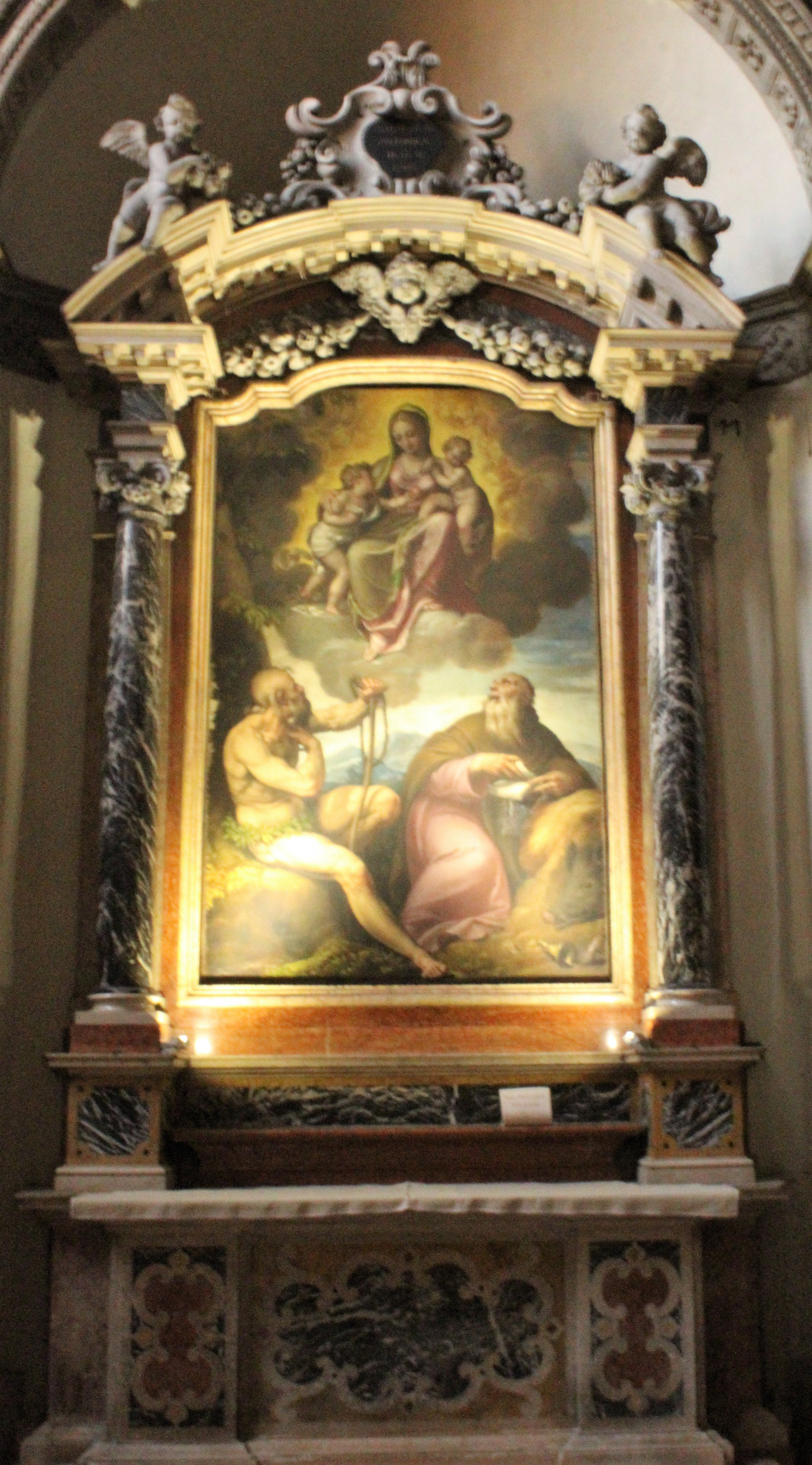
Altar of the Dyers, altarpiece by Paolo Farinati

The first altar one encounters on the left side of the nave is that “of the Dyers,” so called because it belonged to the Dyers' guild, as evidenced by the cartouche placed at the top. The related altarpiece was painted by Paolo Farinati in 1559, (Note: The date is known from the note in Giornale, Paolo Farinati's account book, which revealed much about his professional life. In Fabbri (2008, p. 60).) and depicts Saints Onuphrius and Anthony Abbot, protectors of dyers and other textile activities. Next to the altar is placed in a niche the bust of Nicola Mazza sculpted by Ugo Zannoni. The next altar, the Carteri altar, houses the altarpiece St. John the Baptist, St. Peter and St. Paul, traditionally attributed to Francesco Torbido but more likely the work of painters from his workshop. It has also been suggested that the author may be Dionisio Battaglia, also a pupil of Torbido. Above the Renaissance arch enclosing the altar is inscribed, “DIVI S. IO. BAPTISTAE PIETRO MAR. VICENTIO SACRAU."

Before reaching the next altar, some remnants of the frescoes that once must have decorated the walls can be glimpsed. The Dionisi altar, which is the third, is enclosed by an elaborate Renaissance frame; the interior is unfinished, yet it houses a painting by Paolo Farinati, The Virgin with Saints Jerome and Albert (painted in 1555), topped by a lunette, Dove of the Holy Spirit, attributed to Agostino Ugolini.

The last altar on the left side is the so-called “altar of the Spasimo.” The related altarpiece Meeting of Jesus with the Madonna on Calvary was painted in 1524 by medallist Giovanni Maria Pomedello; (Note: Pomeddello signed and dated it: "JOHANNES MARIA POMEDELLUS VILLAFRANCORUM AURIFEX VERONENSIS F(ECIT) DIE XX DECEMBRIS MDXXIII". In Fabbri (2008, p. 54).) the angels depicted in the pendentives, however, are the work of Giovanni Caliari. To the left is the side door of the church surmounted by a sarcophagus bearing the Pesenza family crest.

=== Pipe organ ===
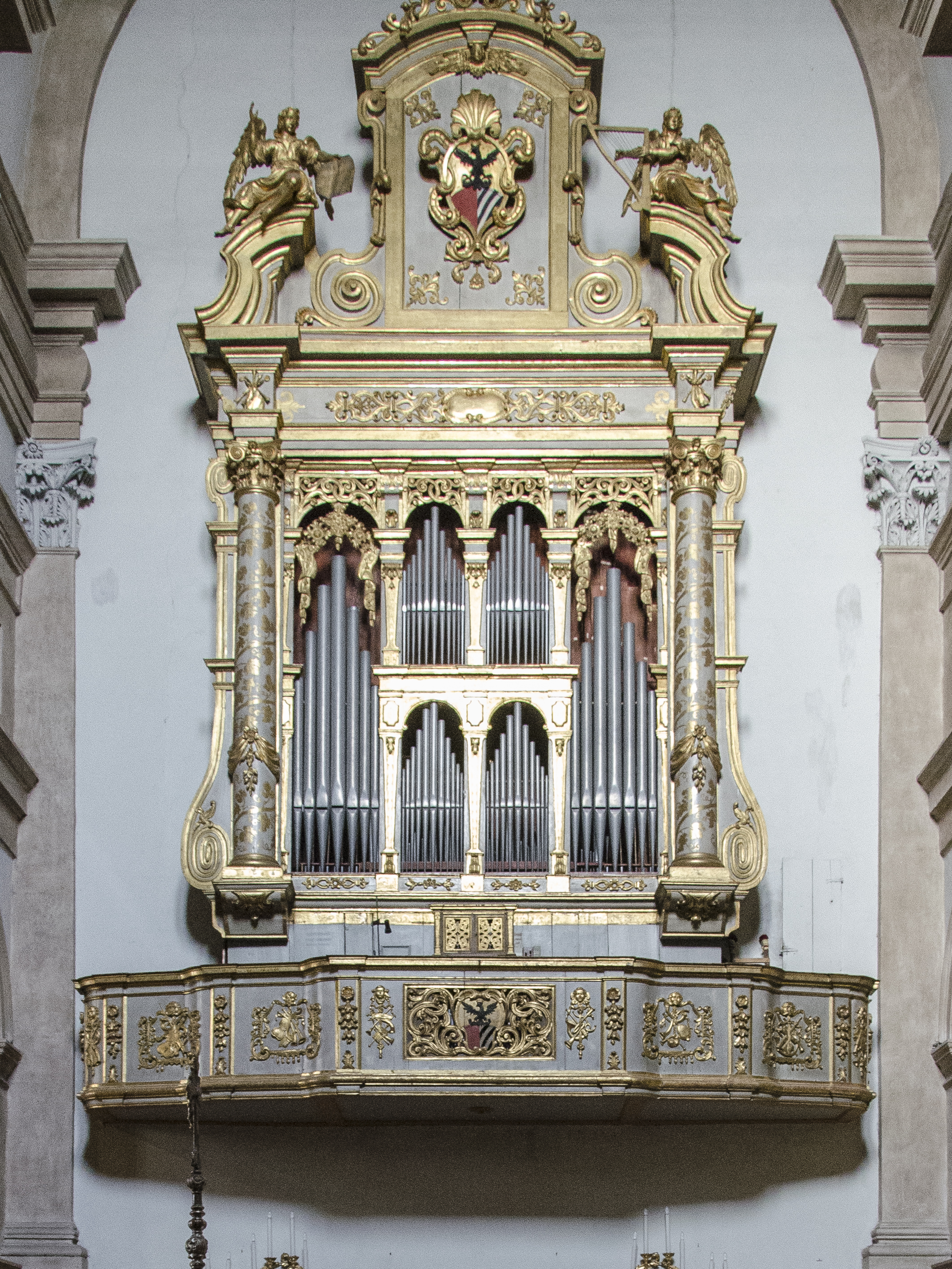
Pipe organ of the church

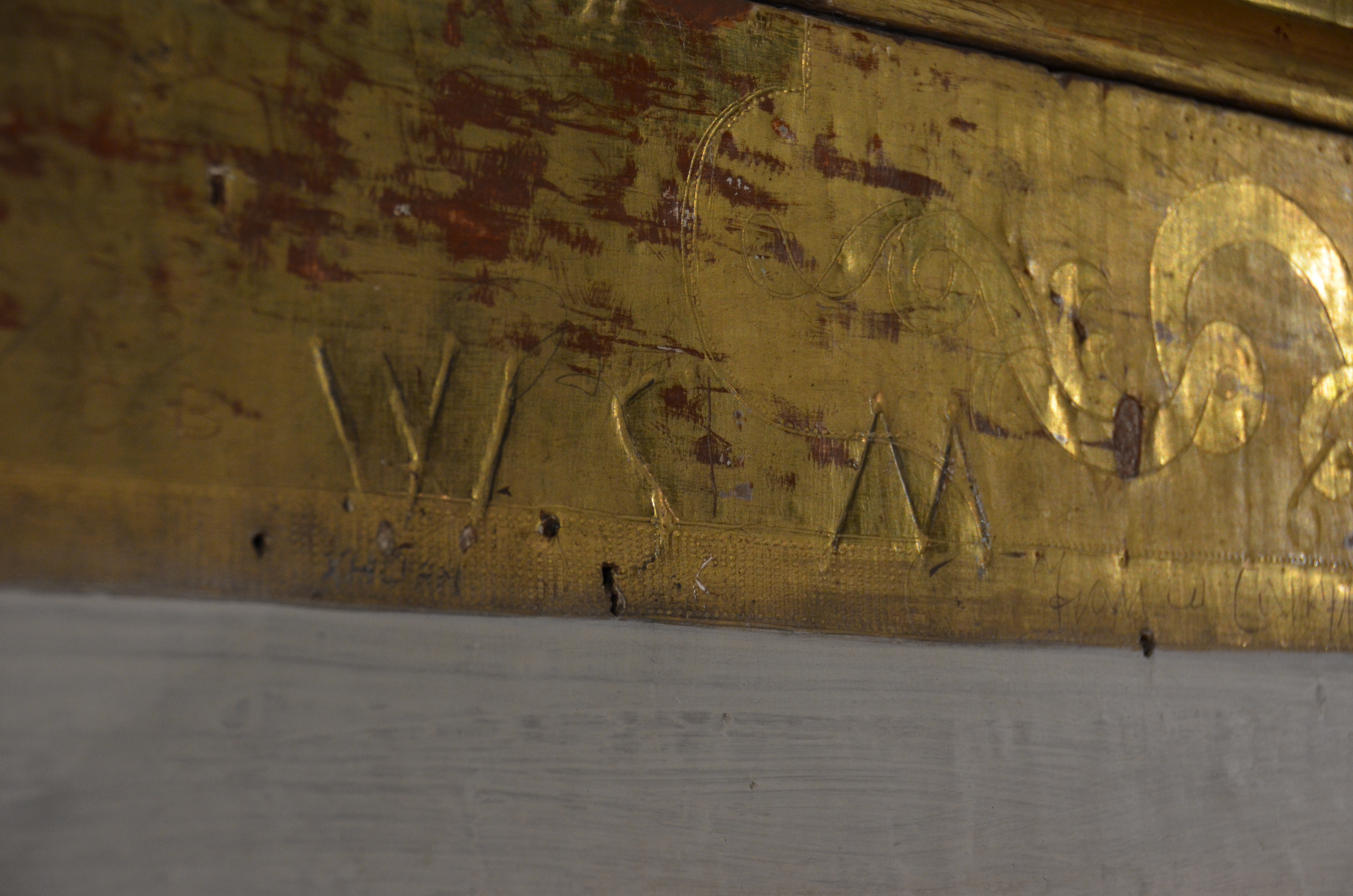
Engraving of Mozart's initials

On the choir loft to the left of the chancel is a historic pipe organ of the Baroque type, built in 1716 by Giuseppe Bonatti, an organ builder from Desenzano and a pupil of Carlo Prati. It was played by the young Wolfgang Amadeus Mozart on January 7, 1770, during one of his trips to Italy, and it seems that he used a penknife to engrave his initials W.G.M. on the case, which are still visible today. In 1786 it was restored for the first time by Girolamo Zavarise, while Giuseppe Grigolli remodeled it in the second half of the 19th century.

The instrument, which was restored again in 2002, with fully mechanical transmission, has two keyboards and a slanting pedalboard, with a total of 24 registers.

The diatonic keys are made of boxwood while the chromatic keys are made of ebony. The case originally had two painted doors, which are now missing. The pediment, divided into four parts, is richly decorated with carvings and gilding; on the pediment, in the center, is depicted the noble coat of arms of the Marquises Saibante. The façade has 36 tin reeds divided into four bays, on the major reed of the left side is inscribed: “Opus Joseph Bonatti Xni 1716,” while inside an engraving was found during restoration: “Joseph Bonati Desentiano Opus in pristinum restitutum a Hieronymo Zavarise Verona et auxit Contrabassi anno Domini MDCCLXXXVI.”

== Cloister and sacristy ==
The ancient fifteenth-century cloister stands to the east of the church and can be reached through a door that opens at the side of the chancel. Partially demolished in the mid-19th century to make way for Austrian barracks, only the northern wing and part of the southern wing remain of the original although its arches are now blind. To the left is the sarcophagus of the Gifalconi family, as can be read in the inscription below: “De Grifalchonis sunt hoc situata sepulcro // corpora nobilium clara de gente vororum // restruxere sui post an(n)os mille trecento // regli Scaligerum bis seprem tempore lustra.” On the sarcophagus is carved a cross in the center with two griffins on either side; in the lower portion is a scene of the Annunciation of Mary.

In the other preserved parts of the cloister, there are several frescoed lunettes by Bernardino Muttoni (17th century) that represent a pictorial cycle: Life and Miracles of St. Albert and St. Angelus. The lunettes also include images of some Carmelite saints once accompanied by their names, now obliterated.

From the cloister there is access to the old sacristy in which the altarpiece by Giuseppe Zannoni, originally made for the Saibante altar and then moved there, is kept. On the east side, surrounded by the coats of arms of the Carmelites, there is a canvas by an unknown author but for which the names of Caroto, Raphael and Garofalo have been given, which consists of a copy of Raphael's Madonna del Prato. Other works housed there include the Communion of the Apostles (1780) by Gian Domenico Cignaroli, Adoration of the Shepherds attributed to Carletto Caliari, and several paintings by Giovanni Battista Caliari.

== See also ==
- Monuments of Verona
- Churches of Verona
- Roman Catholic Diocese of Verona

== Bibliography ==
- Benini, Gianfranco (1988). Le chiese di Verona: guida storico-artistica [The churches of Verona: a historical-artistic guide] (in Italian). Arte e natura libri.
- Borelli, Giorgio (1981). Chiese e monasteri nel territorio veronese [Churches and monasteries in the Verona area] (in Italian). Verona: Banca Popolare di Verona.
- Fabbri, Luca (2008). Chiesa di San Tomaso Cantuariense [Church of San Tomaso Cantuariense] (in Italian). San Giovanni Lupatoto: Tipolitografia Artigiana s.n.c.
- Forni, Umberto (2002). L'organo Bonatti di San Tomaso Cantuariense: storia e restauro [The Bonatti organ of San Tomaso Cantauriense: history and restoration] (in Italian). Grafiche Aurora.
- Girardi, Enrico (1968). Gli organi della città di Verona [The organs of the city of Verona] (in Italian). Alba: Edizioni Paoline.
- Moretti, Corrado (1989). L'Organo italiano [The Italian Organ] (in Italian). Monza: Casa musicale eco. ISBN 88-6053-030-X.
- Segala, Franco (1985). Le campane della chiesa di San Tomaso Cantuariense di Verona [The bells of the church of San Tomaso Cantuariense in Verona.] (in Italian).
- Viviani, Giuseppe Franco (2004). Chiese nel veronese [Churches in the Verona area] (in Italian). Verona: Società cattolica di assicurazione.
