= Francesco dai Libri =

Italian painter

Francesco dai Libri, the elder, born at Verona in 1452, was the son of Stefano dai Libri, an illuminator of books. He was the father of Girolamo dai Libri, and is known as an illuminator of choir books for the churches of his native city.
