= Ex Libris =

Ex Libris may refer to:

- An ex libris (bookplate), a label affixed to a book to indicate ownership
- Ex Libris (band), a Dutch metal band
- Ex Libris (bookshop), a Swiss retail company
- "Ex Libris" (Charmed), a 2000 episode of the television series Charmed
- Ex Libris: Confessions of a Common Reader, a 1998 collection of essays by Anne Fadiman
- Ex Libris (game), a party game
- Ex Libris Group, an Israeli software company that sells library automation software
- Exlibris (music label), subsidiary of Danish publisher Gyldendal.
- Ex Libris: The New York Public Library, a 2017 American documentary film
- Ex Libris, an imprint of Rizzoli International Publications

== See also ==
- Rex Libris, a comic book series by James Turner
- Xlibris, a publishing and printing services provider based in Indiana
