= Girolamo dai Libri =

Italian painter

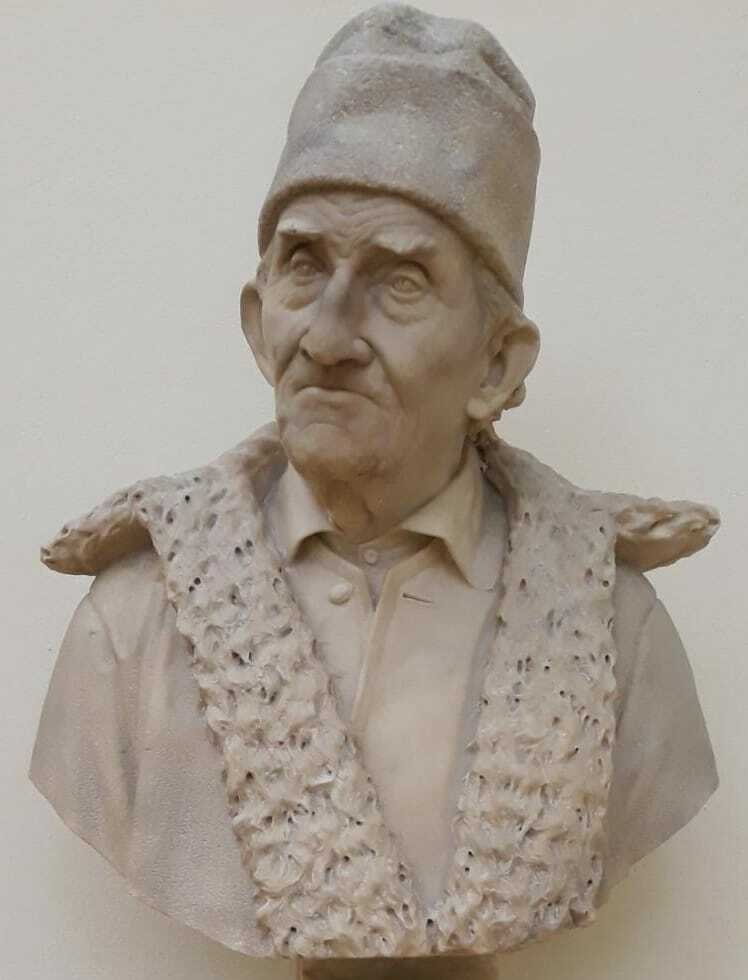
The bust of Girolamo dai Libri at the protomoteca of the Verona Public Library

Girolamo dai Libri (1474/1475 – July 2, 1555) was an Italian illuminator of manuscripts and painter of altarpieces, working in an early Renaissance style.

He learned the art from his father Francesco dai Libri, a skilled illuminator, but most likely also attended the workshop of Domenico Morone, where he formed a friendship with Morone's son Francesco, with whom he later collaborated on several commissions as an adult. Already at a young age he distinguished himself in the production of miniatures, especially for the convent of Santa Maria in Organo in Verona. According to the account of Giorgio Vasari, he astonished his contemporaries when, at about 25 years of age, he painted for the same church the altarpiece Deposition from the Cross, a work deeply influenced by the style of Andrea Mantegna. This influence is also evident in his later works, which additionally show echoes of the Venetian models of Bellini and Montagna. Starting in the 1510s, his paintings were further enriched by Lombard-Roman influences introduced to the city by Giovan Francesco Caroto.

A distinctive feature of his work is the landscape background framing the main scenes, rendered with meticulous attention to detail. Striking examples of this mastery can be found in the Nativity with Rabbits and in Christ and the Samaritan Woman at the Well. This attention to landscape derives from his training as an illuminator, an activity he never abandoned throughout his career, combining it with the execution of large canvases.

After overcoming a period of stylistic uncertainty at the end of the 1520s, he returned to drawing inspiration from the Mantegnesque models that had marked his youthful works, producing some of his most prized canvases, including the Madonna dell'Ombrellino and the Madonna della Quercia, dating respectively to 1530 and 1533 and now both preserved in the museo di Castelvecchio in Verona.

== Biography ==
=== Birth and training as an illuminator ===
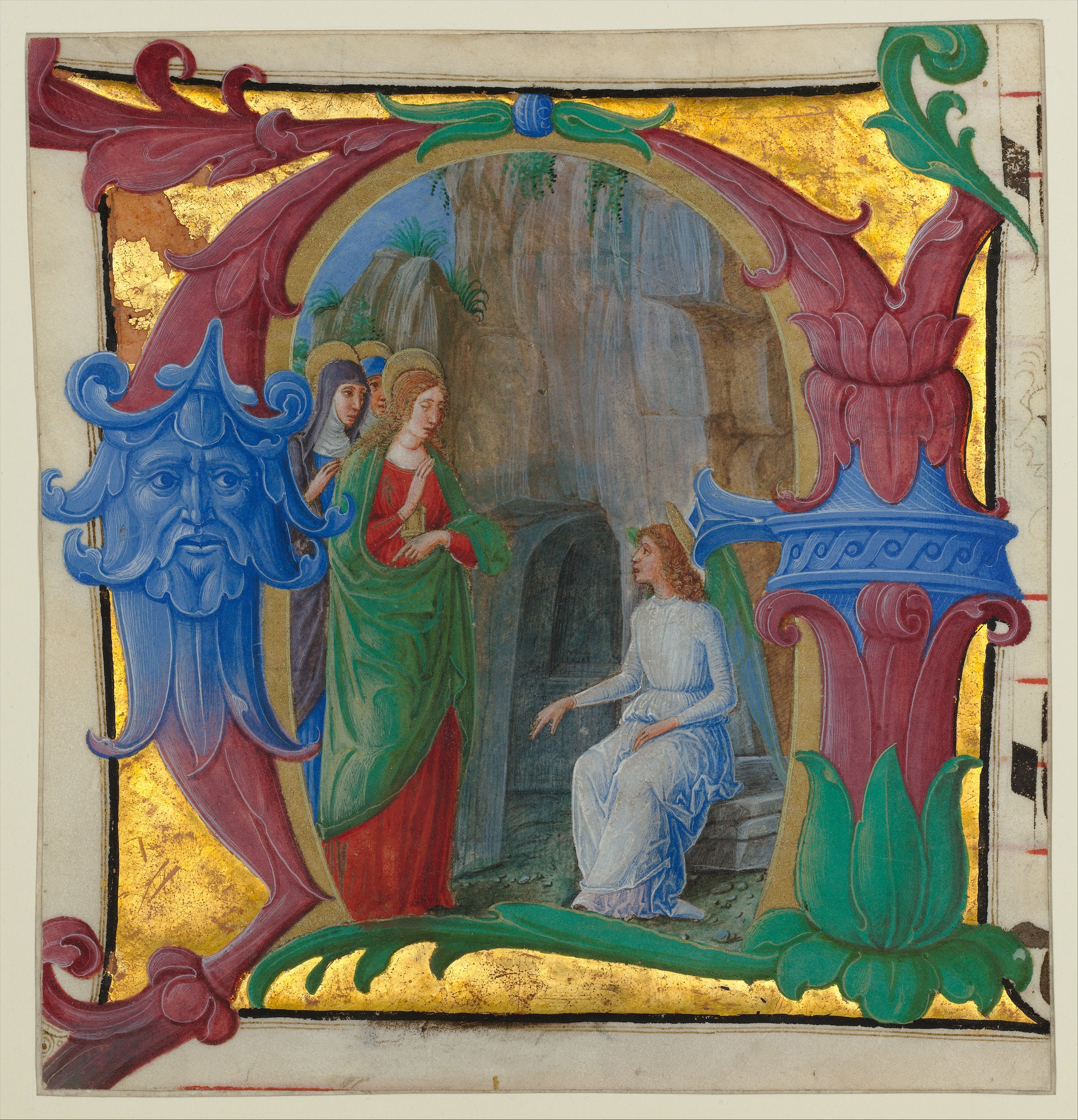
One of the miniatures created by Girolamo dai Libri between 1490 and 1500, today preserved at the Metropolitan Museum in New York City

The second son of Francesco dai Libri, a renowned Veronese illuminator, and of Granata, Girolamo was presumably born in Verona around 1474. This date of birth is inferred from a 1492 register listing him as eighteen years old, correcting what Vasari wrote in his Le Vite, where he placed it in 1472. The earliest record of a dai Libri family in Verona dates back to a tax register of the San Vitale district in 1433, mentioning Girolamo's grandfather, Stefano dai Libris di Francesco, a calligrapher or illuminator (from which the surname dai Libri derived), probably active in the scriptorium of the Abbey of San Zeno. Thus, Girolamo's family had been devoted for at least two generations to the art of writing and manuscript decoration.

Girolamo spent his youth in Verona, in the San Paolo district, where he learned the craft together with his brother Callisto, with whom he would later collaborate.

=== 1510s: the plague and new influences ===
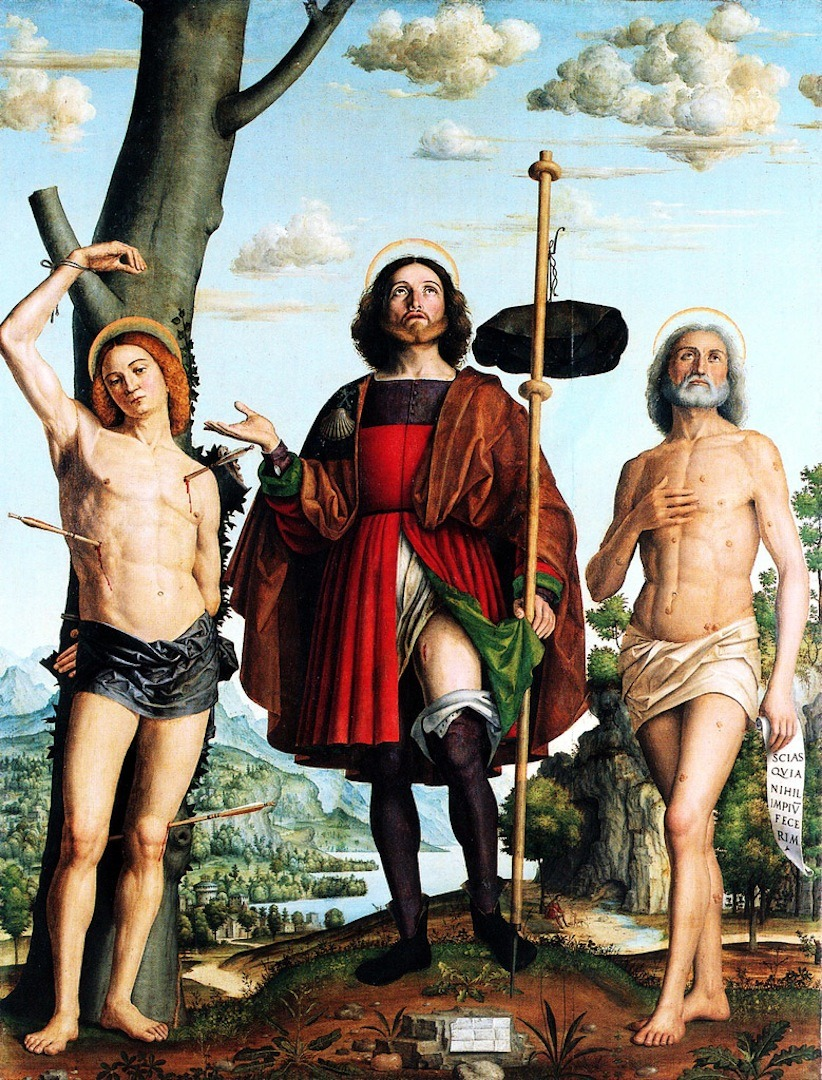
Saints Roch, Sebastian and Job, c. 1510–1512, San Tomaso Becket, Verona

Towards the end of the first decade of the sixteenth century, Girolamo married a woman whose name is unknown. She died shortly after the marriage, leaving the painter with two children: Chiara (born in 1507) and Francesco (born in 1509). According to Vasari, Francesco also became a painter of some importance, but none of his works have survived. Recent studies have suggested that the painter's wife may have died of the plague that struck Verona between 1510 and 1512, following the War of the League of Cambrai and the Venetian defeat at the Battle of Agnadello.

In these same years Girolamo dai Libri's style changed, moving «towards a painting characterized by a softer and smoother manner, due to a keener attention to the Giovanni Bellini, Cima da Conegliano and Antonello da Messina environment», and influenced by the Lombard and Roman style brought to Verona by Giovan Francesco Caroto, who had encountered the different artistic currents of the peninsula during his travels. The first example of this new style by dai Libri is the canvas of the Saints Roch, Sebastian and Job for the San Tomaso Cantuariense. The art historian Mauro Lucco has suggested a dating shortly after 1510, linking the presence of Saint Roch, protector against plagues, with the epidemic that struck Verona in those years. A later dating, however, is excluded, since the canvas still shows the clear influence of Mantegna, typical of Girolamo's early production.

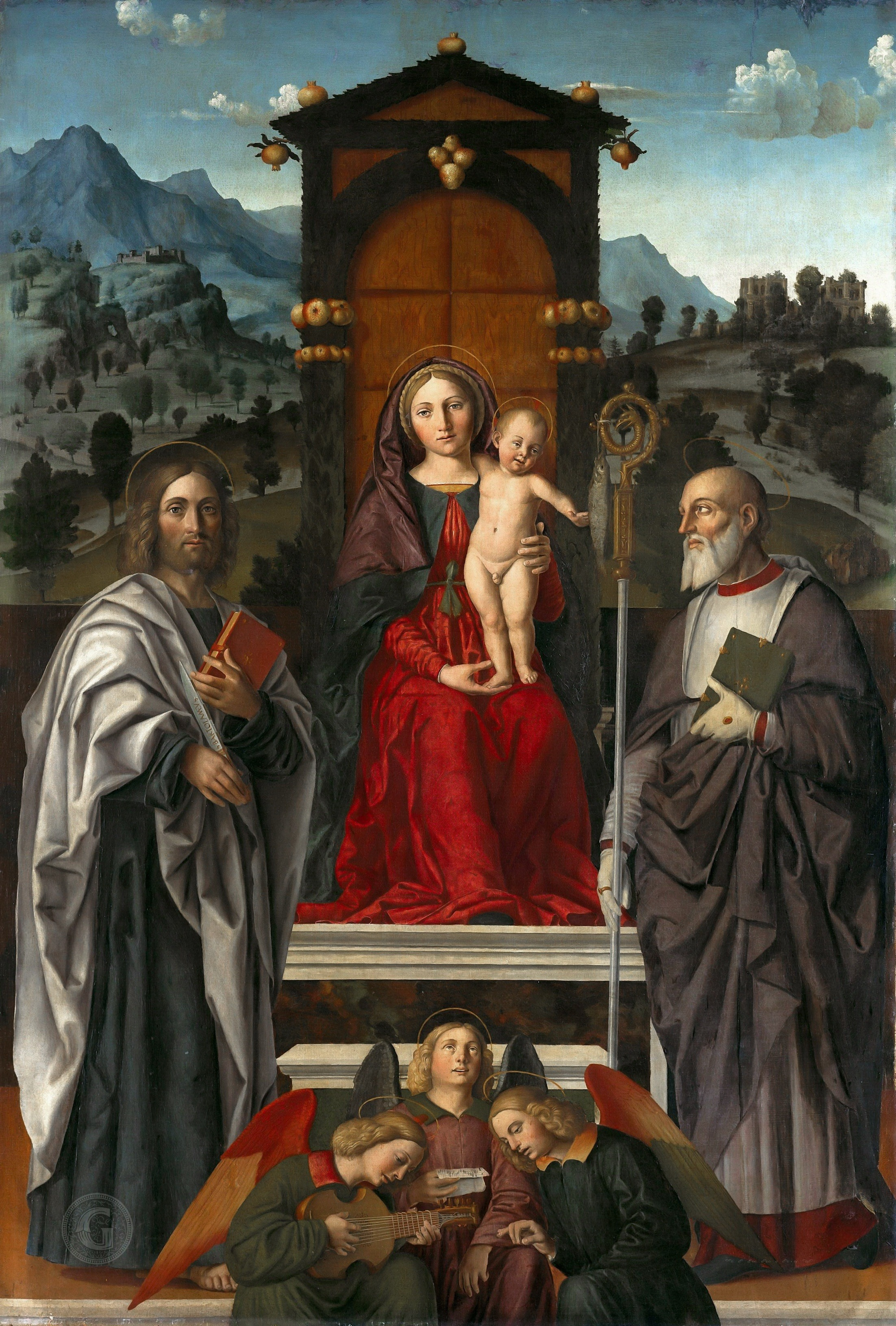
Virgin between Saints Bartholomew and Zeno, 1510s circa, Gemäldegalerie, Berlin

In the same style, and likewise connected to the plague through the presence of the thaumaturgic saint, is the altarpiece Madonna and Child with Saints Roch and Sebastian, commissioned for the family altar of the Maffei (and for this reason also known as the Maffei Madonna) in the church of San Giacomo alla Pigna and since 1812 kept in the civic collections (now in the Castelvecchio Museum). Some critics have also seen in this work the influence of Bartolomeo Montagna. Without the figure of Saint Roch, but certainly belonging to the same phase of Girolamo dai Libri's production, is also the altarpiece Virgin between Saints Bartholomew and Zeno painted on probable commission by Bartolomeo Bonalini for his family chapel in Santa Maria in Organo, now displayed in the Gemäldegalerie in Berlin. Also from the same period is a Madonna and Child, now in the Castelvecchio Museum, whose depiction of the Virgin was later used as a model for some subsequent works.

=== The peak of production ===
The following years marked the most mature and fruitful phase of Girolamo dai Libri's artistic production. Following the upheavals of the recently concluded war, the fathers of Santa Maria in Organo decided to renovate their church and commissioned the two best local painters, Francesco Morone and Girolamo dai Libri, to decorate the shutters of the new organ. According to the contract signed on November 12, 1515, the shutters were to appear «beautiful et laudable to those who understand the art». Vasari attributes to Francesco the Saint Benedict and Saint John the Evangelist, while to Girolamo he assigns the depictions of the flowers and the background; (Note: Concerning the attribution of the shutters, Giorgio Vasari states that "Girolamo also painted in Santa Maria in Organi, where he made his first work, on one of the organ shutters (the other painted by his companion Francesco Morone), two Saints on the outside, and inside a Nativity.") the art historian Carlo Del Bravo has essentially proposed the opposite. Contemporary criticism tends not to draw a sharp distinction between the contributions of the two artists, arguing that both, great friends, collaborated on the shutters in perfect harmony, without quarrels, dividing the work equally and mutually influencing each other. The work was completed in 1516 and placed in a chapel specially built by the Olivetans to house the organ. Later, probably on the occasion of the Baroque renovation of the organ, the shutters passed to the Dal Pozzo family until, at the beginning of the 19th century, Count Bartolomeo donated them to the parish church of Marcellise (today in the municipality of San Martino Buon Albergo), where they are still kept.

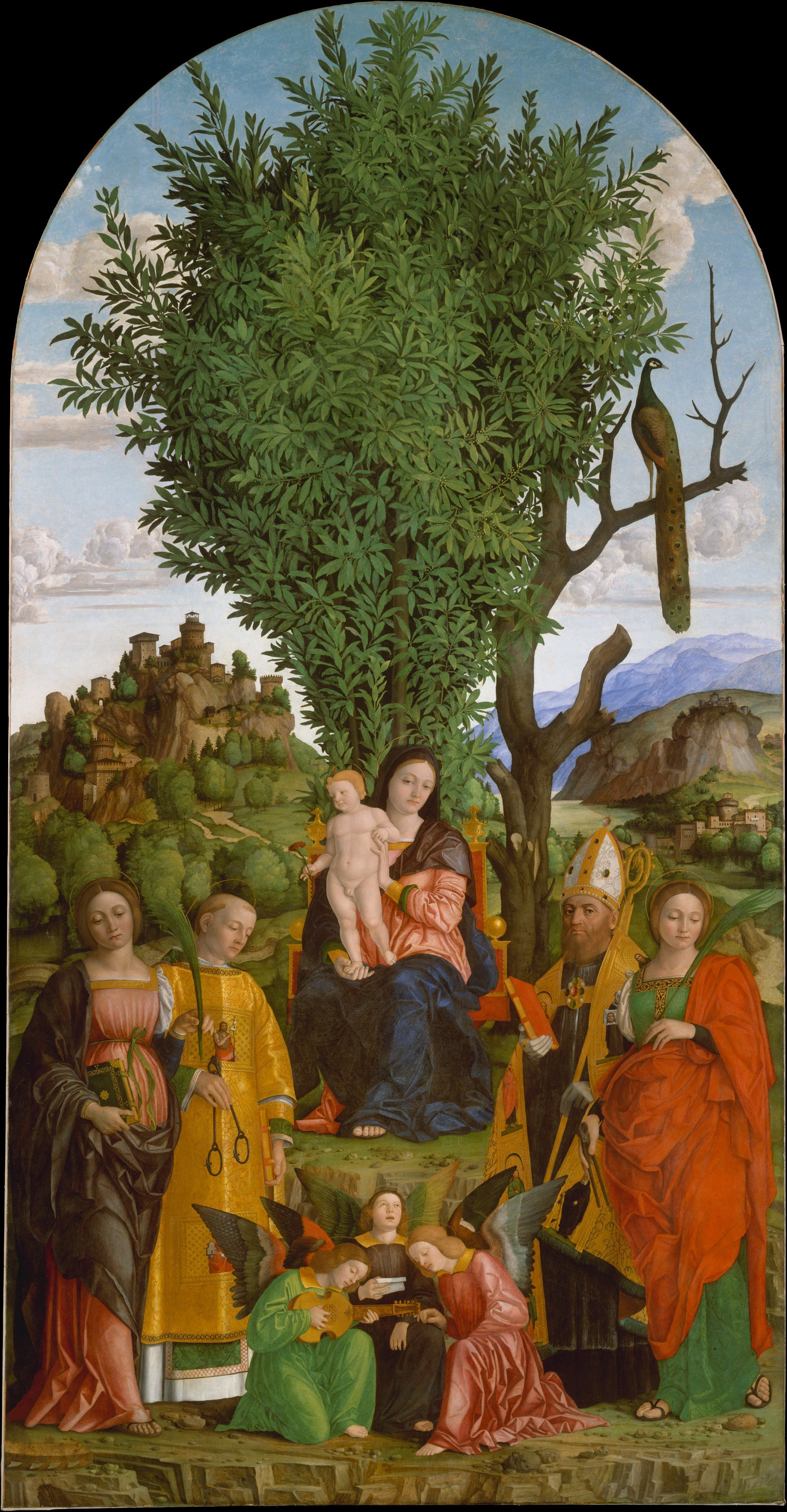
Madonna and Child with Saints, c. 1520, Metropolitan Museum, New York City

The success achieved with the organ shutters paved the way for numerous commissions for Girolamo, including the altarpiece depicting the Madonna and Child with Saints, painted for the small church of San Leonardo in Monte (on which the Forte San Leonardo was built in the nineteenth century) and now in the Metropolitan Museum in New York City. This Madonna, considered by critics as «the result of consummate chromatic expertise and a profound study of the effects of contrasts and harmonies», marks the beginning of the painter and miniaturist's most mature phase. The background landscape is particularly detailed, as Vasari himself observed. (Note: Regarding the Madonna and Child with Saints in the Metropolitan Museum, Giorgio Vasari said «he also painted in San Lionardo in Monte, near Verona, the high altar panel for the Cartieri family, which is a large work, with many figures, and highly esteemed by all, and above all it contains a most beautiful landscape...». In.) From the same period is also the canvas Jesus and the Samaritan Woman at the Well, preserved in the Santa Maria Maggiore Church in Monteforte d'Alpone; in this work, the influence of his friend Francesco Morone in the representation of Christ is particularly evident.

Probably between 1518 and 1522, dai Libri painted for the San Paolo in Campo Marzio in Verona the altarpiece Madonna and Child with Saints Anne, Joseph and Joachim and the canvas Virgin and Child with Saint Anne, originally the central portion of a triptych intended for the Santa Maria della Scala. The latter work, for which Paolo Morando and Francesco Torbido painted the side figures, is now kept in the National Gallery in London.

Alongside his large canvases, dai Libri continued to devote himself to manuscript illumination, as documented by the payments recorded between 1519 and 1520 for the illustration of the choir books of the abbey of Santa Maria in Organo. In these documents the artist is mentioned both as pictor and as miniator.

Around the 1520s Girolamo remarried a much younger woman, Cecilia, with whom he had three children: Zuan Paolo, Agnese and Granata.

=== Maturity, crisis and final years ===
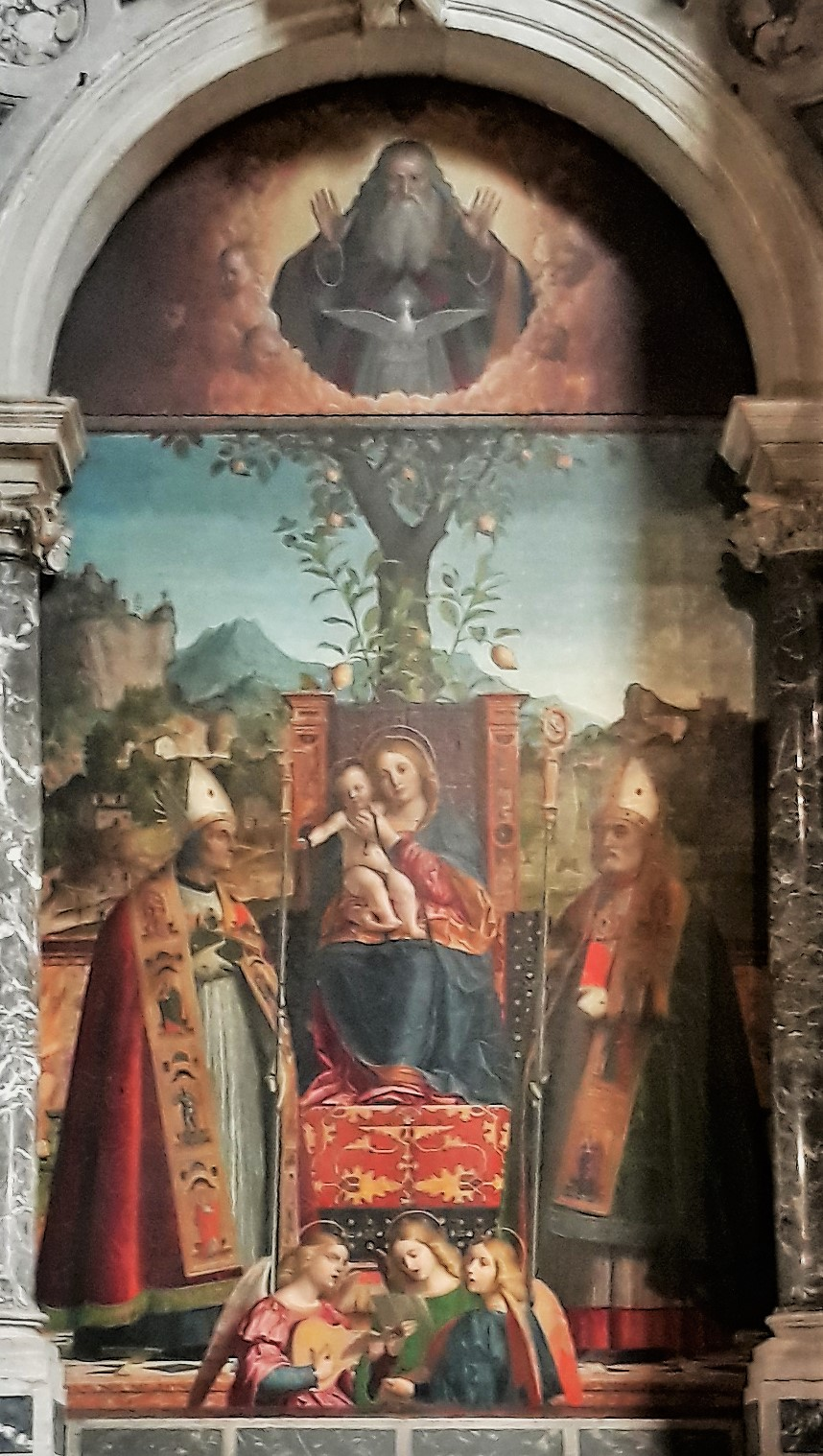
Madonna between Saints Lorenzo Giustiniani and Zeno, 1526, San Giorgio in Braida Church, Verona

The intense artistic activity of the 1520s marks dai Libri's entry into his mature phase. In 1526 he painted the altarpiece known as the Madonna between Saints Lorenzo Giustiniani and Zeno for the fourth chapel on the left of San Giorgio in Braida Church, in his native city. The dating of the work is certain thanks to the inscription on the canvas: «A.D. MDXXVI MEN. MAR. XXVIIII / HIERONIMUS A LIBRIS PINXIT». In it, the author depicts the Virgin flanked by the patron saints of the chapel, Saint Zeno and Saint Lawrence, together with some angels placed beneath the throne.

Between 1526 and 1528 dai Libri worked on the predella for the altarpiece (by Francesco Bonsignori) of the main altar of the Chapel of San Biagio, located in the Church of Saints Nazaro and Celso in Verona. In it, Girolamo represented, without interruption, a Miracle of Saint Blaise, a Martyrdom of Saint Sebastian, and a Beheading of Saint Juliana. Some art historians have criticized this work, noting in it «a certain decline in the quality of the panel due to the artificial and mannered gestures and the imbalance of proportions», while nonetheless praising the background landscape for «its function of both uniting and separating the three independent stories» in «ways clearly indebted to Perugino». Girolamo, together with his brother Callisto, was also responsible for the gilding and burnishing of the valuable frame enclosing Bonsignori's altarpiece.

Some art historians date the canvas Baptism of the Ibis, also a modest work, to the years immediately following the San Biagio predella, in line with dai Libri's period of productive crisis. However, other critics consider it much later, dating it to the 1540s, thus making it the last known altarpiece by the artist and a clear qualitative regression compared to the works of the 1530s. In any case, the composition of this Baptism of Christ seems indebted to Perugino's analogous work, today preserved at the Kunsthistorisches Museum, to the point of «almost becoming a copy».

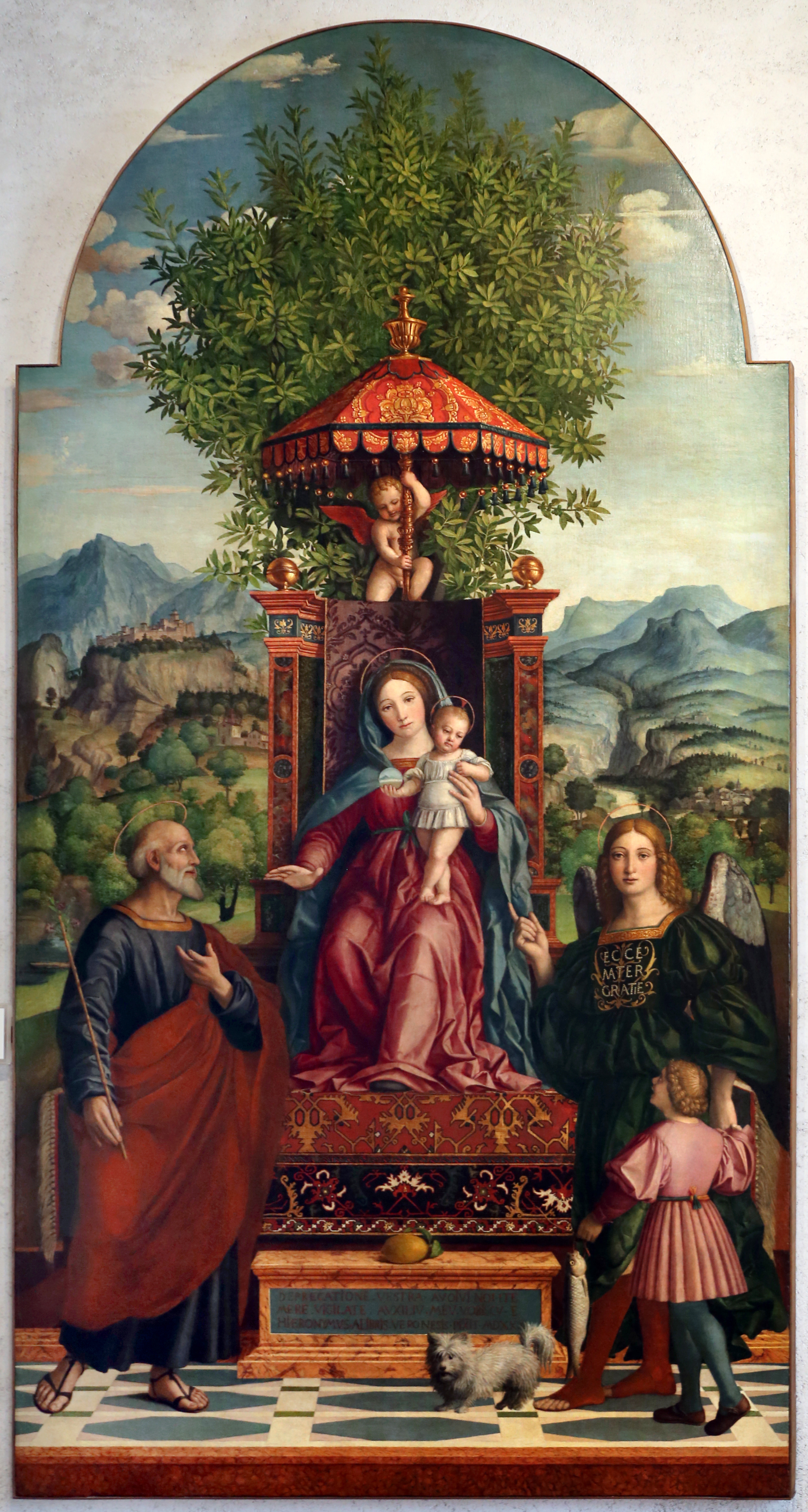
Madonna dell'Ombrellino, 1530, Castelvecchio Museum, Verona

After these missteps, dai Libri returned to his most congenial compositions, characterized by broad naturalistic depictions of background landscapes, absorbing the most innovative artistic trends circulating in the city thanks to the influence of young painters such as Caroto, Torbido, and Giolfino.

Indeed, a return to his origins and a rediscovered quality are already evident in the altarpiece Madonna dell'Ombrellino, signed and dated 1530. This work, created for the high altar of the Church of Santa Maria della Vittoria Nuova in Verona (later destroyed during a World War II bombing), was transferred to the city's civic collections in 1812, when the building was deconsecrated and its assets became state property. In it, the «Mantegnesque reflection in the attitude of Mary, derived from Mantegna's Madonna della Vittoria,» is evident. The altarpiece, superior in workmanship to that for the Chapel of San Biagio, was completed with a predella, today housed in the Musée de Grenoble in France, depicting a Visitation of the Virgin. For the same church, dai Libri also painted a Saint Onuphrius, now lost.

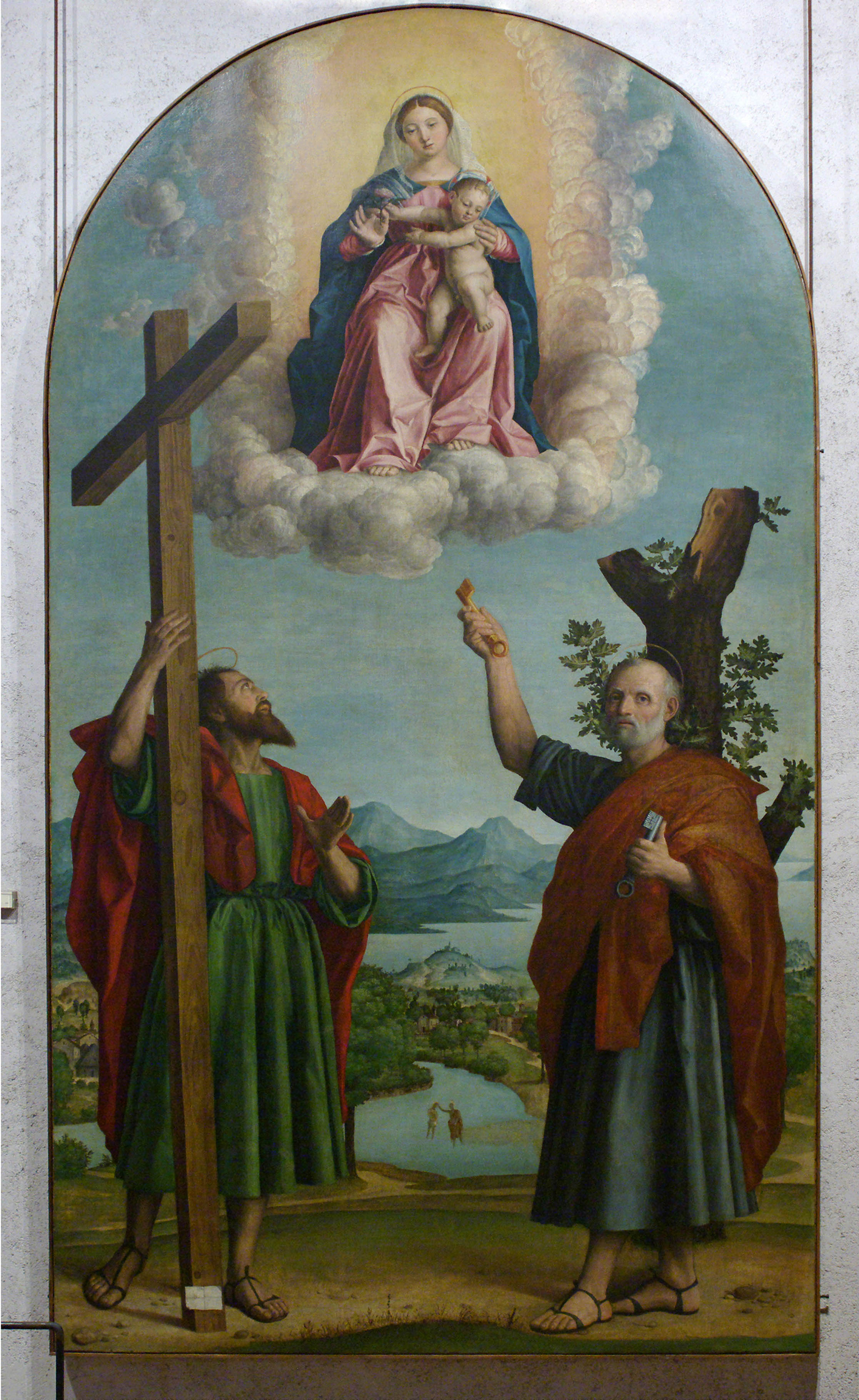
Madonna della Quercia, 1533 or later, Castelvecchio Museum, Verona

A few years later, dai Libri signed the Madonna and Child with Saints Peter and Andrew (known as Madonna della Quercia), considered by many his masterpiece. Art historian Gino Castiglioni praised its «grandiose spatial structure, the sure balance of volumes, the splendid chromatic rendering», noting the influence of Giovanni Gerolamo Savoldo's canvas painted for Santa Maria in Organo in 1533 on its composition. In the representation of the Virgin, once again Mantegna's influence is visible, typical of Girolamo's youthful activity, while in the figure of the Archangel Gabriel the style of Perugino is evident, showing the artist's search for new inspirations during his most mature phase. If the dating of the Baptism of the Ibis is accepted as the second half of the 1520s, rejecting the hypothesis of a placement in the 1540s, then the Madonna della Quercia represents the last known canvas executed by dai Libri.

Nevertheless, Girolamo dai Libri continued to devote himself to art even in old age. He is found, still an able illuminator, in three choir books kept at the Abbey of San Benedetto in Polirone in San Benedetto Po; two of them, dated 1554 and 1555, also bear the signature Theodorus de Castrogofredo (Teodoro da Castel Goffredo), a skilled contemporary scribe (scriptor).

According to Vasari, the master died on July 2, 1555, in his hometown of Verona, where he had spent his entire life, receiving great recognition.

== Illuminations ==
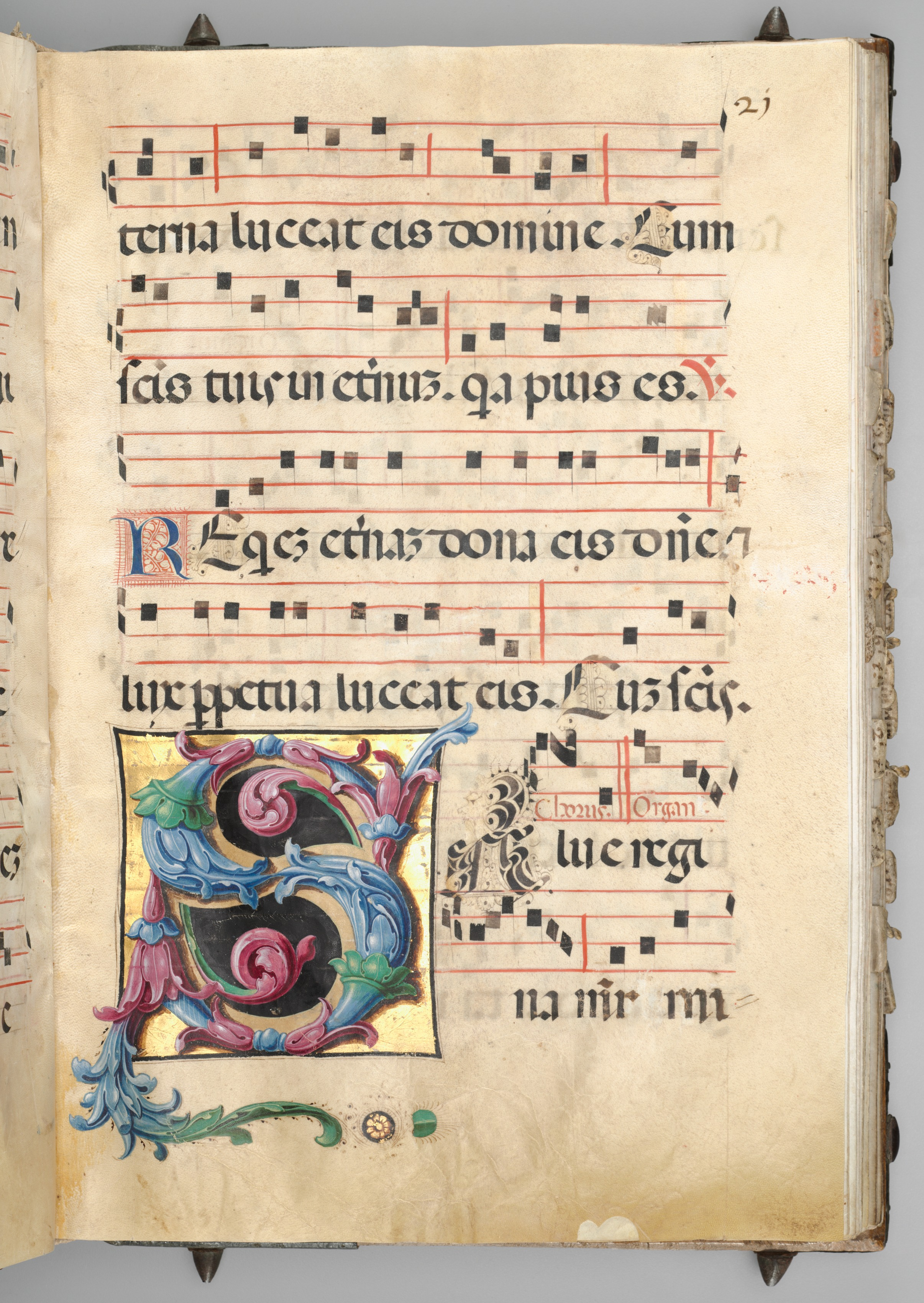
A Gradual illuminated by Girolamo dai Libri preserved at the Cleveland Museum of Art

Alongside the creation of large altarpieces, Girolamo dai Libri devoted himself throughout his life to the art of miniature painting, with which he had first begun his career in youth. Although as of 2023 comprehensive and systematic studies on this part of his output are still lacking, modern art historians share Vasari's praise, who considered him one of the greatest illuminators of his time. In addition to the aforementioned Nativity preserved in Brescia, some of the most important miniatures attributed to Girolamo are today housed in the world's most prestigious museums. At the Castelvecchio Museum, for example, one can admire the choir book pages depicting the Entry of Jesus into Jerusalem and the Way to Calvary, a Resurrection, and a Descent of the Holy Spirit. The Victoria and Albert Museum in London houses instead a David the Musician, considered a work of «the highest quality, with wonderful coloristic and luminous effects», while the Cleveland Museum of Art possesses a Nativity, also of remarkable workmanship.

== Style ==
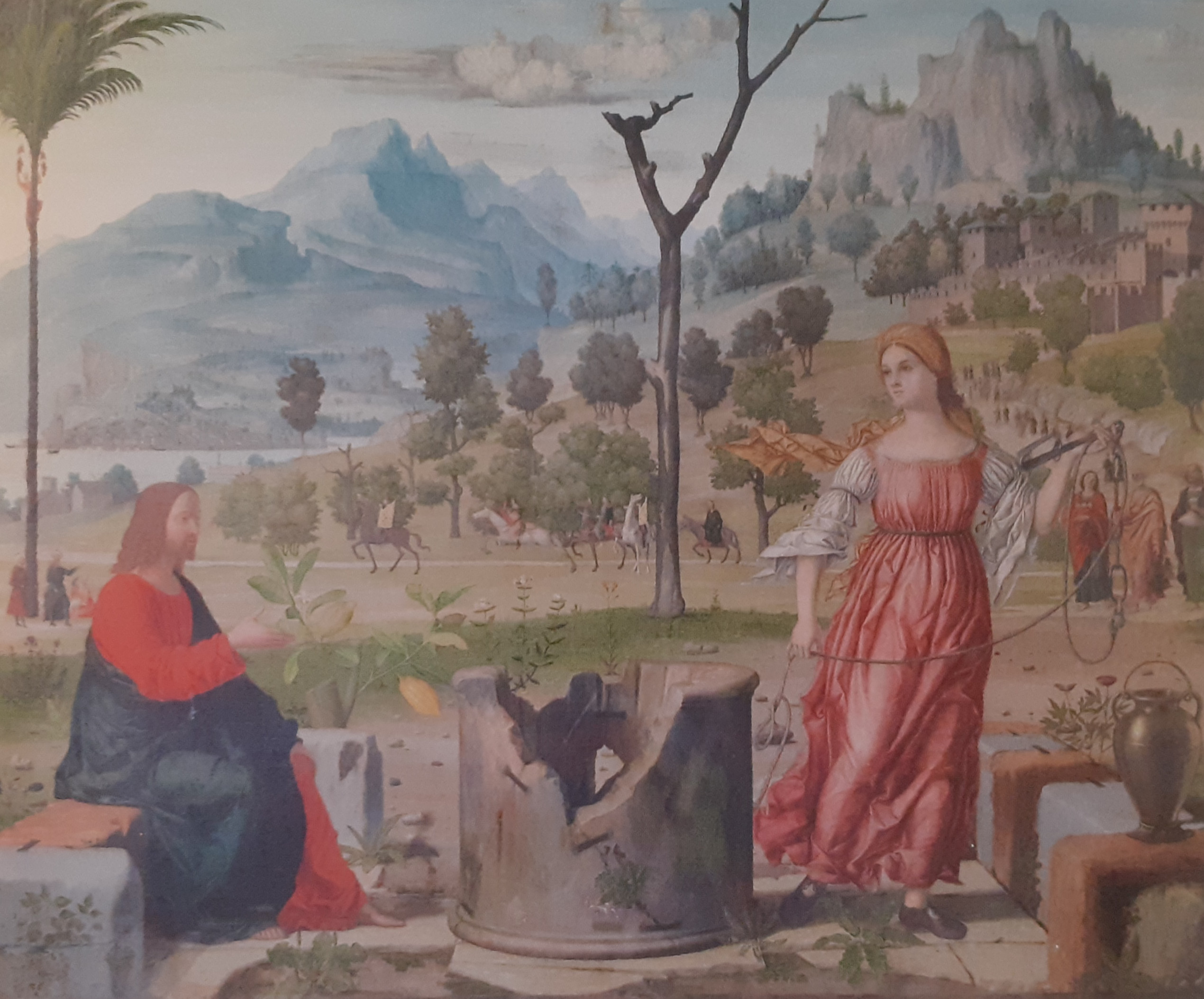
Christ and the Samaritan Woman at the Well, Santa Maria Maggiore Church, Monteforte d'Alpone

Trained in the art of illumination under his father's guidance, Girolamo dai Libri likely learned the technique of large-scale painting in the workshop of Domenico Morone, where he befriended his son Francesco. However, his style diverged from that of the latter due to the hardness of forms, a trait inherited from his father, and for the «figures with vivid expressions of pain, the rigid drapery with brilliant folds». A distinctive feature of his paintings is the background landscapes framing the main scenes, characterized by detailed attention, a legacy of his training as an illuminator. This preference for landscape is evident in works such as Nativity of the Rabbits or Christ and the Samaritan Woman at the Well. In particular, it has been noted that «the landscapes in Girolamo's paintings, always high and variously defined, fill the pictorial field and in their naturalistic precision are as much protagonists of the composition as the figures».

In his early works the influence of Andrea Mantegna is clearly manifest, especially in the attitudes of the figures, an influence that would return in his mature works after a period of experimentation. Over the years, also thanks to new stylistic ideas introduced into the city by Giovan Francesco Caroto, dai Libri's style evolved, abandoning the hardness of his youthful works to embrace a softer and more eclectic tendency. Nonetheless, attention to detail and the preference for landscapes remained, as evident in the precious garments of his figures, «sparkling with delightful light effects», and in the imposing «splendid pre-Alpine panorama» depicted in the San Paolo altarpiece. It has been observed that the search for detail, especially in the garments of the figures, helped to overcome the static nature of the scenes, probably one of the major limitations of Girolamo's painting.

For Girolamo, naturalistic representation was a non-negotiable necessity, of which he was fully aware, to the point that in an expert report of 1530 he wrote that «a good and skilled painter must know well how to imitate nature, and feign what nature does, and be universal in painting landscapes, figures, all sorts of animals, landscapes, buildings, and generally all things produced by nature...».

== Bibliography ==
- Berenson, B. (1907). North Italian Painters of the Renaissance. Putnam's Sons. p. 240.
- Alloro, Roberto, ed. (2015). San Pietro in Cattedra a Marcellise. La chiesa e la comunità. Verona: Scripta. ISBN 978-88-98877-22-5.
- Bagatin, Pier Luigi (2016). Fra Giovanni da Verona e la scuola olivetana dell'intarsio ligneo. Treviso: Antilia. ISBN 978-88-97336-51-8.
- Benini, Gianfranco (1988). Le chiese di Verona: guida storico-artistica. Arte e natura libri.
- Brugnoli, Pierpaolo (1954). La chiesa di San Giorgio. Le Guide, 5. Verona.
- Castiglioni, Gino; Marinelli, Sergio, eds. (1986). Miniatura veronese del Rinascimento. Verona: Museo di Castelvecchio.
- Castiglioni, Gino, ed. (2008). Per Girolamo dai Libri: pittore e miniatore del Rinascimento veronese. Venezia: Marsilio. ISBN 978-88-317-9611-8.
- Eberhardt, Hans-Joachim (1974). Pierpaolo Brugnoli (ed.). Girolamo dai Libri. Maestri della pittura veronese. Verona: Banca Mutua Popolare.
- Fabbri, Luca (2008). Chiesa di San Tomaso Cantuariense. San Giovanni Lupatoto: Tipolitografia Artigiana.
- Farquhar, Maria (1855). Ralph Nicholson Wornum (ed.). Biographical catalogue of the principal Italian painters. London: Woodfall & Kinder. p. 84.
- Dal Forno, Federico (1982). La Chiesa dei Santi Nazaro e Celso a Verona. Verona: Fiorini.
- Gerola, Giuseppe (1913). Le antiche pale di S. Maria in Organo di Verona. Bergamo: Istituto italiano d'arti grafiche.
- Museo di Castelvecchio (2010). Paola Marini; Ettore Napione; Gianni Peretti (eds.). Museo di Castelvecchio. Catalogo generale dei dipinti e delle miniature delle collezioni civiche veronesi. Dalla fine del X all'inizio del XVI secolo. Vol. 1. Cinisello Balsamo: Silvana. ISBN 978-88-8215-425-7.
- Marinelli, Sergio (1983). Museo di Castelvecchio. Venezia: Storti.
- Marinelli, Sergio (1990). Mauro Lucco (ed.). Il Quattrocento. Milano: Electa.
- Paola Marini; Christian Campanella, eds. (2011). La Basilica di Santa Anastasia a Verona. Storia e restauro. Verona: Banco Popolare. ISBN 978-88-90645-40-2.
- Tessari, Umberto Gaetano (1958). La chiesa di San Nazaro. Verona: Vita Veronese.
- Vasari, Giorgio (1568). Le vite de' più eccellenti pittori, scultori e architettori. Firenze.
