= Libri (journal) =

- Discipline: Library science, information studies
- Language: English
- Edited by: Kendra S. Albright, Theo J.D. Bothma

Publication details
- History: 1950-present
- Publisher: De Gruyter Saur
- Frequency: Quarterly
- Impact factor: 0.667 (2021)

Standard abbreviations
- ISO 4: Libri

Indexing
- ISSN: 0024-2667 (print); 1865-8423 (web)
- LCCN: 55012826
- OCLC no.: 643471387

Links
- Journal homepage; Online access; Online archive

Libri is a quarterly peer-reviewed academic journal covering library science and information studies. It was established in 1950 and is published by De Gruyter Saur. The editors-in-chief are Kendra S. Albright and Theo J.D. Bothma.

== Abstracting and indexing ==
The journal is abstracted and indexed in:

- CAB Abstracts
- Current Contents/Social and Behavioral Sciences
- EBSCO databases
- FRANCIS
- Index Islamicus
- International Bibliography of Periodical Literature
- Modern Language Association Database
- ProQuest databases
- Scopus
- Social Sciences Citation Index

According to the Journal Citation Reports, the journal has a 2021 impact factor of 0.667.
