= Scalzi =

Scalzi is a surname. Notable people with the surname include:

- Alessandro Scalzi (died c. 1596), Italian painter
- Carlo Scalzi (c. 1700–after 1738), Italian castrato
- Joe Scalzi (born 1951), Australian politician
- John Scalzi (born 1969), American science fiction author
- Johnny Scalzi (1907–1962), American baseball player
- Mike Scalzi (born 1969), American musician and philosophy professor
- Pivio and Aldo De Scalzi, Italian composers
- Sandra Scalzi (born 1986), Australian association footballer
- Skeeter Scalzi (1913–1984), American baseball player
- Vittorio De Scalzi (born 1949), Italian singer

== See also ==
- Scalzi, Verona, religious building in Verona, Italy
- Scalzi, Venice, Roman Catholic Carmelite church in Venice, Italy
