= Vittore Bocchetta =

Italian sculptor, painter, and academic (1918–2021)

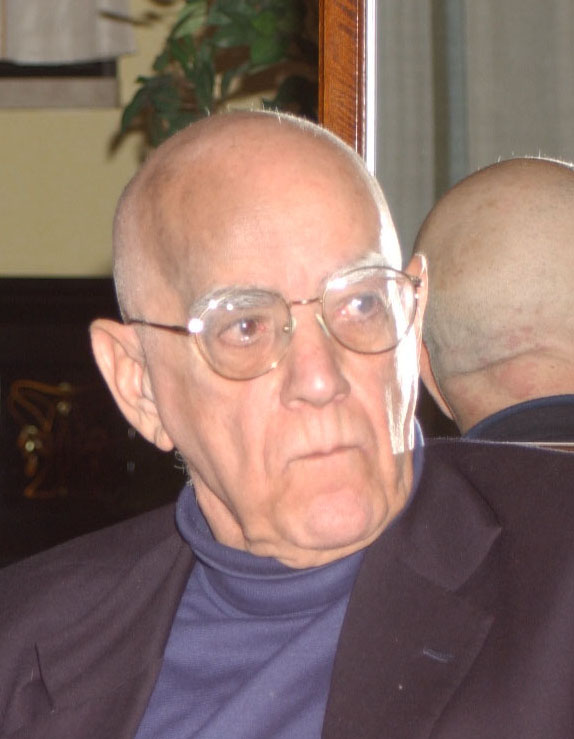
- Bocchetta in 2001
- Born: 15 November 1918; Sassari, Sardinia, Italy
- Died: 18 February 2021 (aged 102); Verona, Italy

Academic background
- Education: University of Florence

Academic work
- Discipline: Linguistics, literary criticism
- Institutions: Istituto alle Stimate; Saint Xavier College; University of Chicago; Indiana University; Loyola University Chicago
- Main interests: Romance languages (Italian, Spanish), comparative literature, World War II
- Military career
- Allegiance: Italian resistance movement
- Unit: National Liberation Committee
- Conflicts: World War II (POW)

Vittore Bocchetta (15 November 1918 – 18 February 2021) was an Italian sculptor, painter, and academic. Bocchetta was a member of the Italian resistance movement during World War II.

== Biography ==
Vittore Bocchetta was born in Sassari, Sardinia to a military engineer. After his childhood in Sardinia, he moved with his family first to Bologna and then to Verona. Even though he belonged to a family of artists, his parents did not permit him to paint or draw because they were afraid that he might be distracted from his education.

After his father's early death in 1935, he went back to Sardinia with his family. He received a degree in classical humanities in Cagliari in 1938. Then, he returned to Verona and was admitted to the University of Florence, faculty of classical humanities and history of philosophy, where he graduated in 1944. He earned a living by teaching private lessons and as a professor of classical humanities at Ginnasio Maffei (1939) and Istituto alle Stimate (1942) in Verona.

=== Resistance activity (1940–1945) ===
His dedication to the principles of political freedom led him to be reported to the fascist Italian authorities in 1941. He was soon involved in underground anti-fascist activities. On 9 September 1943, the day after the occupation of Verona by the German army, he contributed to the liberation of several hundreds of Italian soldiers from the Carlo Montanari barracks, where they were kept prisoners by the Nazis. He was jailed for the first time in November 1943 together with his group of anti-fascist comrades. Among the rare moments of comfort there were the visits of Father Chiot, the prison chaplain. Bocchetta later represented Father Chiot in a monument in front of the prison dedicated in 1988. When released in February 1944, he became a member of the local unit of the National Liberation Committee as an independent.

He had just enough time to graduate in Florence in May 1944 and was again arrested by the fascist Italian police in July 1944. After two weeks of interrogation and torture, he was handed over to the SD, the intelligence service of the SS, and tortured once more. After a brief stay in the Bolzano Transit Camp, he was deported on 4 September 1944 to the Flossenbürg concentration camp where he was registered with the number 21631. On 30 September 1944 he was destined for the subsidiary camp of Hersbruck where he was used in forced labor of digging a tunnel to a nearby mountain (Houbirg) near Happurg.

Within a few months he witnessed the death of several of his comrades from Verona. He managed to survive thanks to a series of fortuitous circumstances and his relatively young age (26 years). In early April 1945, with the approach of US and UK forces, the Hersbruck camp was evacuated by the Germans and the survivors had to move towards southern Bavaria with so-called death marches.

During one of the stages, near Schmidmühlen, he managed to escape together with a deported French. He dropped unconscious in front of the fence of Stalag 383, a camp for Allied prisoners of war at Hohenfels, by that time virtually left unattended by the German Nazis. He was cared for and nurtured by a group of Allied prisoners and recovered gradually. Liberated by the Americans in May 1945, after a stay in Regensburg, he finally returned to Italy in June 1945.

=== Postwar period (1945–1948) ===
Upon returning to Italy after the war, he conflicted with party politics that criticized his decision to remain independent. He experienced difficulty in finding employment, but in 1947 he was rewarded by the Italian government for a bravura production of the medieval poem The Passion of Christ, the first work staged in modern times in the Teatro Romano in Verona. However, he soon realized that the same fascists in different shirts were in power and was forced to leave Italy.

=== In Argentina and Venezuela (1949–1958) ===
He left Italy for Argentina in January 1949 as a correspondent for Verona's newspaper L'Arena. In Buenos Aires he applied for a teaching position at the university there, but his credentials were not accepted. He was forced to accept a job in a ceramics factory, where he realized his talent in sculpture. His sculptures were exhibited for the first time in Quilmes (Buenos Aires) in 1952. He was awarded for Mother Earth, a project for a monument that he actually developed 20 years later in Chicago. His ceramic miniatures were exhibited and sold at Harrods Buenos Aires as collector's items. The unstable political climate of Argentina under the government of Juan Perón forced him to close his own ceramics factory he had bought in Buenos Aires. He left Argentina in 1954.

He went to Caracas, Venezuela, where he earned a living by teaching Latin, painting murals and creating maquettes, sketches, and projects that have since been realized as elements of the Paseo de los Illustres, a memorial park in Caracas, where the political and social climate was also unfavorable under the dictatorship of Marcos Pérez Jiménez. During a stay in the United States he learned of the coup in Venezuela in January 1958 and decided not to return to Caracas, abandoning all his works.

=== In Chicago (1958–1986) ===
In the United States, penniless and unable to speak English, he was forced to earn a living by painting commercial murals that he detested and never signed.

Subsequently, he became an instructor of Spanish at Saint Xavier College, Chicago; lecturer in Italian at the University of Chicago, where he earned his second doctorate in Romance languages and literature in 1967; instructor of Spanish at Indiana University; professor of Comparative Literature at Roosevelt University; assistant professor of Spanish Literature at Loyola University Chicago.

Between 1963 and 1967, he authored or coauthored Italian-English and Latin-English dictionaries. The Italian-English dictionary was published in various editions and reprints up to 1985.

He was again involved in production of commercial statuettes but finally passed to larger sculptures, such as Daedalus (1964) that he considered his first true work of art. He used various materials like bronze, stainless steel, alabaster, and marble. He used to cast his own bronzes and came to the process of creating a thin layer of bronze surrounding a core of plastic.

In 1966, he taught conversational Italian with his 13-week television series When in Rome, broadcast by WTTW.

Between 1969 and 1973 his work was exhibited in eight one-man shows in Detroit, New York, and in particular at John Hancock Center, Chicago, that had just been opened by that time.

In 1975, following an exhibition at Chicago Public Library Cultural Center, a selection of his works was auctioned in the Auditorium of the American Dental Association, Chicago, for the benefit of the American Cancer Society.

Between 1970 and 1976 he published, with Editorial Gredos, Madrid, two scholarly books on Latin and Spanish Golden Age literature and one on 20th century western philosophy. His book Horacio en Villegas y en Fray Luis de León won him an ad honorem membership in 1972 at the Ovidium Society, University of Bucharest.

Several sculptures of his are among public monuments in Chicago, including Mother Earth, in the Popular Library of the Harold Washington Chicago Public Library, The Egg Man and Man in the Sand, in 201 East Chestnut Street.

=== Return to Italy ===
From 1986 to 1989 he spent several months each year in Verona, working on literary and artistic projects with a view to "polish and defend his memories".

The first work of this period is Cypress, an obelisk of stainless steel over 7 meters high. It is a monument in memory of the six young heroes that on 17 July 1944 attacked the prison of Verona and freed an important anti-fascist leader. The sculpture was inaugurated on 25 April 1988, during the official commemoration of the liberation of Italy from the Nazis, in the ground where the prison was once located. The following year (1989), during the official 25 April commemoration, the monument to Father Chiot, chaplain of the prison, was unveiled just opposite.

In 1989 he settled permanently in Verona and published the first edition of his autobiography regarding the period 1940–1945, which he subsequently revised and corrected several times following the discovery of new documents. He published the English translation in 1991 and the German translation in 2003. The book also represented the plot of the documentary Spiriti liberi, 1941–1945, Ribelli a Verona produced by City of Verona and Wider das Vergessen (Do not Forget) directed by the German Claus Dobberke and premiered at the Film Museum in Potsdam on 27 January 2007, the International Holocaust Remembrance Day.

He committed himself to defend the memory of the resistance against fascism with speeches, meetings in schools, articles in newspapers and magazines.

In 1995 he published an essay on the involvement of the chemical and pharmaceutical industry in Nazi Germany and its substantial impunity following the Nuremberg trial of 1947-1948.

Since 2001, he repeatedly traveled to Germany where a group of intellectuals founded the association Freundeskreis Vittore Bocchetta - Non Dimenticare that promoted his participation in various initiatives as a witness and victim of the Nazi period.

From 2003 to 2006, his sculptures and paintings were exhibited in various German cities with a traveling exhibition. On 8 May 2007 he took part in the unveiling of his sculpture Ohne Namen (Without Name) at the site of the extermination camp at Hersbruck from which he escaped in 1945.

Bocchetta died on 18 February 2021 in Verona at the age of 102.

== Exhibitions ==
- Quilmes (Buenos Aires), Argentina, Consejo Municipal, 1952.
- Caracas (Distrito Federal), Venezuela, Paseo de los Ilustres, 1956.
- Detroit (Michigan), US, Detroit Bank & Trust Company, 1969.
- Chicago (Illinois), US, Upper Avenue National Bank, John Hancock Center, 1970.
- Chicago (Illinois), US, J. Walter Thompson Company, John Hancock Center, 1970.
- Chicago (Illinois), US, Aetna Bank, 1970.
- Chicago (Illinois), US, John Hancock Center, 1971; 1973.
- Chicago (Illinois), US, Siegel Galleries, 1971–1977.
- New York (New York), US, Lynn Kottler Galleries, 1973.
- Chicago (Illinois), US, Merrill Chase Galleries, 1974–1978; 1983; 1984.
- Chicago (Illinois), US, Chicago Public Library Cultural Center, 1975.
- Verona, Italy, Palazzo della Ragione, 1991.
- Verona, Italy, Officina d'arte, corso Porta Borsari 17, 1995.
- Caprino Veronese (Verona), Italy, Villa Carlotti, 1995.
- Verona, Italy, Art Gallery Leonardo, 1996.
- Detmold (North Rhine-Westphalia), Germany, Lippischen Landesbibliothek, 2003.
- Wolfsburg (Lower Saxony), Germany, Centro Italiano, 2004.
- Potsdam (Brandenburg), Germany, Altes Rathaus, 2004.
- Lüdenscheid (North Rhine-Westphalia), Germany, Sparkasse, 2005.
- Kassel (Hesse), Germany, Justizzentrum, 2005.
- Weimar (Thuringia), Germany, Literaturhaus, 2006.
- Nuremberg (Bavaria), Germany, Dokumentationszentrum, 2011.

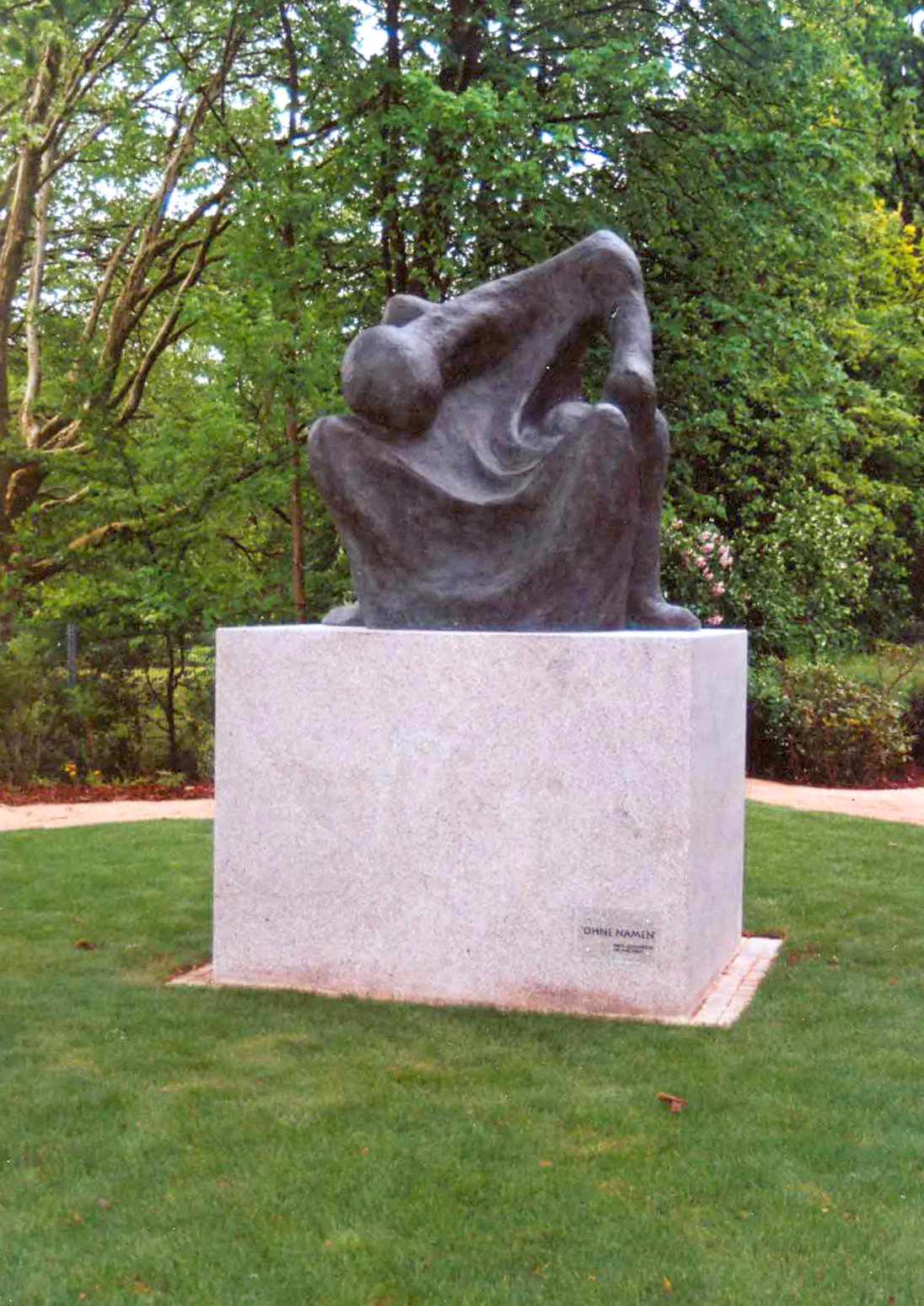
Ohne Namen in the memorial site of the concentration camp, Hersbruck, Germany

== Public monuments ==
- Narcissus and Black Hole, in the Chicago Public Library Cultural Center, Chicago, 1965.
- Painter and Potter, at Ortho-Tain Inc., Bayamon, Puerto Rico, 1966.
- The Egg Man and Man in the Sand, in 201 East Chestnut Street, Chicago, 1968.
- Mother Earth, in the Chicago Public Library Cultural Center, Chicago, 1971.
- Expansion, at Household International Inc., Prospect Heights, Illinois, 1983.
- Cipresso, in the cloister of the church Chiesa degli Scalzi, Verona, Italy, 1988.
- Don Chiot, in largo Don Chiot, Verona, Italy, 1989.
- Omaggio a Pertini, near Villa Carlotti, Caprino Veronese, Verona, Italy, 1995.
- Ohne Namen, in the memorial site of the concentration camp of Hersbruck, Germany, 2007.

== Writings ==
- New Century Vest-Pocket Italian Dictionary. Piscataway, NJ: New Century Publishers. 1963.
- Follett World-Wide Italian Dictionary. Chicago-New York: Follett Publishing. 1965.
- Follett World-Wide Latin Dictionary. Chicago: Follett Publishing. 1967.
- Horacio en Villegas y en Fray Luis de León. Madrid: Editorial Gredos. 1970. ISBN 84-249-3376-1.
- Circunstancialismo del siglo XX. Madrid: Editorial Gredos. 1972. ISBN 84-249-3386-9.
- Sannazaro en Garcilaso. Madrid: Editorial Gredos. 1976. ISBN 84-249-3479-2.
- Spettri scalzi della Bra. Verona-Flossenburg, anni 40 ... 45 ... Verona: Bertani Editore. 1989.
- Sinister. New York: Vantage Press. 1990. ISBN 0-533-08499-7.
- Eye of the Eagle. New York: Vantage Press. 1991. ISBN 0-533-08687-6.
- 1940–1945 Quinquennio Infame. Melegnano (Milano): Montedit. 1995. ISBN 88-86039-44-1.
- Aspirina per Hitler (Impunità di I.G. Farben). Melegnano (Milano): Montedit. 1995. ISBN 88-86039-35-2.
- Norimberga 1946. Processo ai medici assassini. Verona: Edizioni Gielle. 2000.
- Jene fünf verdammten Jahre. Aus Verona in die Konzentrationslager Flossenbürg und Hersbruck. Lage (Germany): Verlag Hans Jacobs. 2003. ISBN 3-89918-118-2.
- Bilder und Skulpturen. Zur Ausstellung der Kunstwerke Vittore Bocchettas. Lage (Germany): Verlag Hans Jacobs. 2003. ISBN 3-89918-120-4.

== Documentary films ==
- KZ Hersbruck - und das Doggerwerk, directed by Gerhard Faul (2000)
- Speciale Deportazione, directed by Antonello Lai - Tele Costa Smeralda (2000)
- Testimonianze dai Lager, directed by Eraldo Mangano - Rai Educational (2002)
- Spiriti liberi, 1941–1945, Ribelli a Verona, directed by Stefano Paiusco - Comune di Verona (2004)
- Non Dimenticare (Wider das Vergessen), directed by Claus Dobberke and Stefan Mehlhorn (2007)
