= Santa Maria degli Scalzi =

Santa Maria degli Scalzi or Chiesa degli Scalzi may refer to:

- Scalzi (Verona)
- Scalzi (Venice)
