= Kristina Meneši =

Serbian historian

Kristina Meneši (Serbian Cyrillic: Кристина Менеши; born 28 October 1977) is a historian, museum curator, and politician in Serbia. She is senior curator at the Museum of Vojvodina and has overseen several exhibitions, many focused on the military history of Vojvodina during World War II. She also served in the Assembly of Vojvodina from 2013 to 2016 as a member of the League of Social Democrats of Vojvodina (LSV).

== Early life and private career ==
Meneši was born in Novi Sad, Socialist Autonomous Province of Vojvodina, in what was then the Socialist Republic of Serbia in the Socialist Federal Republic of Yugoslavia. She is a graduate of the University of Novi Sad Faculty of Philosophy, Department of History (2006). Meneši has worked in the archives collection of the department of contemporary history at the Museum of Vojvodina since 2007, became a curator in 2008, and has been senior curator since 2016. From 2012 to 2016, she was the head of the department. In conjunction with her academic work, she has worked in a project to identity civilian victims in Vojvodina during and after World War II (1941–48).

She oversaw the project War Propaganda in Vojvodina 1941–1945, which has been exhibited in Novi Sad, Rijeka, and Timișoara, and was associate curator of a project entitled Fruška Gora – Bastion of Antifascism, 1941–1945. Her most recent project as of 2019 is Being a Refugee: A European Narrative, which has been exhibited in Novi Sad and Vienna.

== Political career ==
An opponent of Slobodan Milošević's government, Meneši joined the LSV in March 2000. She has held several roles within the party, including serving on its main board. She has also served as a LSV representative in the City Assembly of Novi Sad and has led the assembly's council for culture.

Meneši received the twelfth position on the LSV's electoral list in the 2012 Vojvodina provincial election; the list won eight seats, and she was not immediately elected. She was awarded a mandate on 5 July 2013 as a replacement for Daniel Petrović, who had resigned. The LSV was part of Vojvodina's coalition government during this time, and Meneši served as a supporter of the ministry.

She received the thirty-ninth position on the party's list for the 2016 provincial election and was not returned for a second term when the list won nine mandates. She also appeared in the 225th position (out of 250) on a combined list of the LSV, the Liberal Democratic Party (LDP), and the Social Democratic Party in the concurrent 2016 Serbian parliamentary election. This was too low a position for election to be a realistic prospect, and she was not returned when the list won thirteen mandates. She continues to serve in the City Assembly of Novi Sad.
