= Antonio Ponzano =

Italian painter

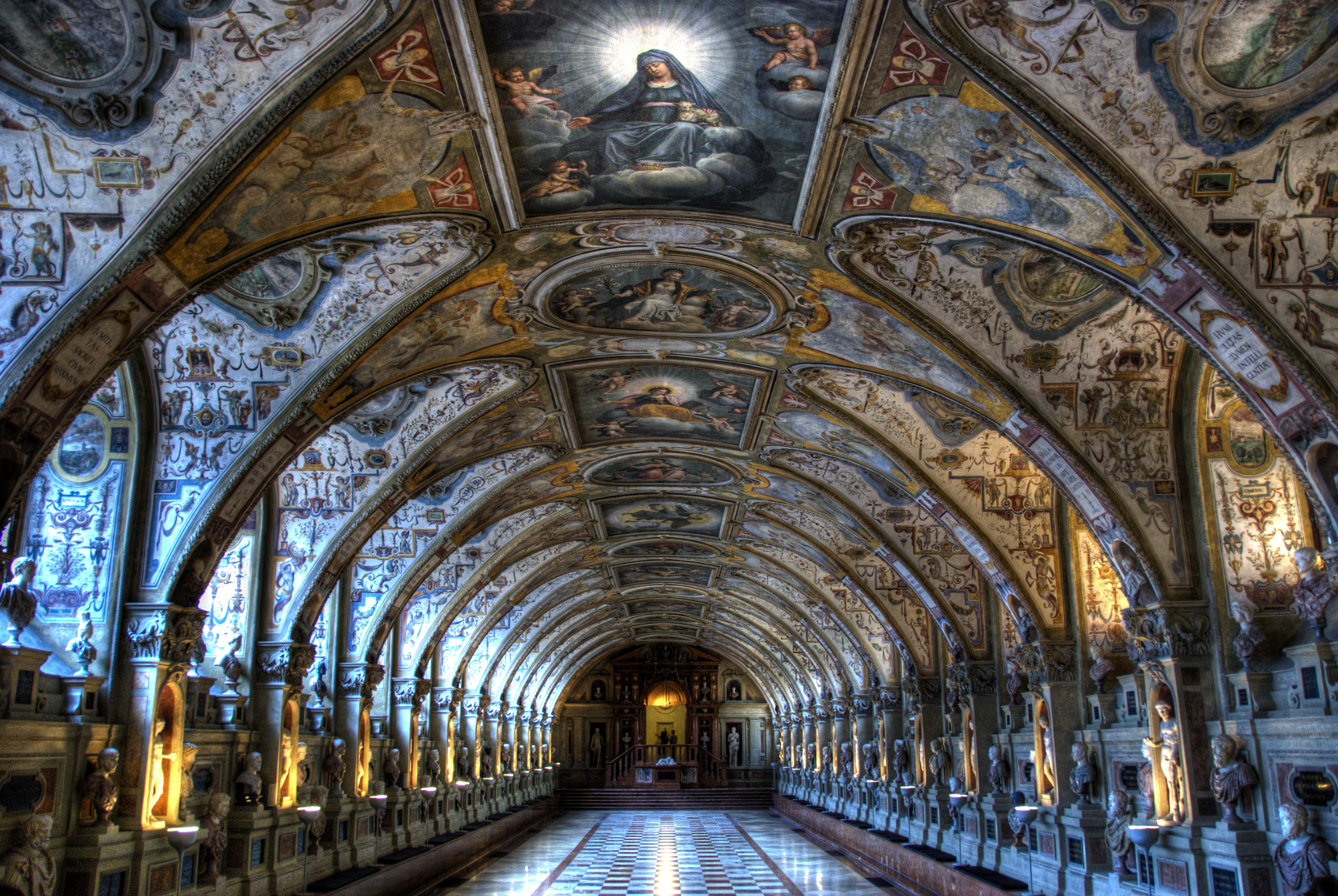
Ponzano's grotesques in the Munich Residenz.

Antonio Ponzano, Ponzoni or Bonzone (died 1602, in Munich) was an Italian Mannerist painter active in the 16th century.

His birthplace is unknown; it may have been Venice, as he was influenced by the Venetian style. He was a studio assistant to Giulio Licinio in 1565 at the court of Maximilian II, Holy Roman Emperor in Vienna. Between 1550 and 1600, many Italian painters moved to the Wittelsbach ducal court. Major banking families, such as the Fuggers, were also significant art patrons. Ponzano himself was an assistant to Friedrich Sustris between 1569 and 1573 in Augsburg, where Sustris worked for Hans Fugger. From 1585 to 1597, Ponzano was at the court in Munich.

Some of Ponzano's paintings from 1570 to 1572 with 'grottesche' survive in the Fugger palace in Augsburg, as well as some of his studio work for Sustris. He also assisted Sustris and Alessandro Scalzi (known as Il Paduano) on their 1580 work at Trausnitz Castle in Landshut, where Ponzano worked on the lodges in the castle, creating scenes of mythological love affairs. Sustris designed the Grottenhof at the Munich Residenz, with the shells and grotesques painted by Ponzano and the Dutchman Pieter de Witte.
