= Museum of Vojvodina =

Museum in Novi Sad, Serbia

- Музеј Војводине
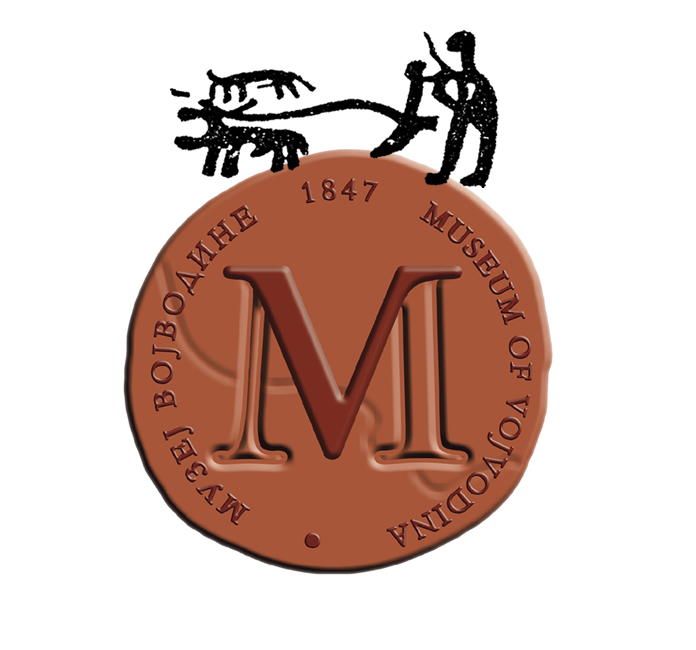

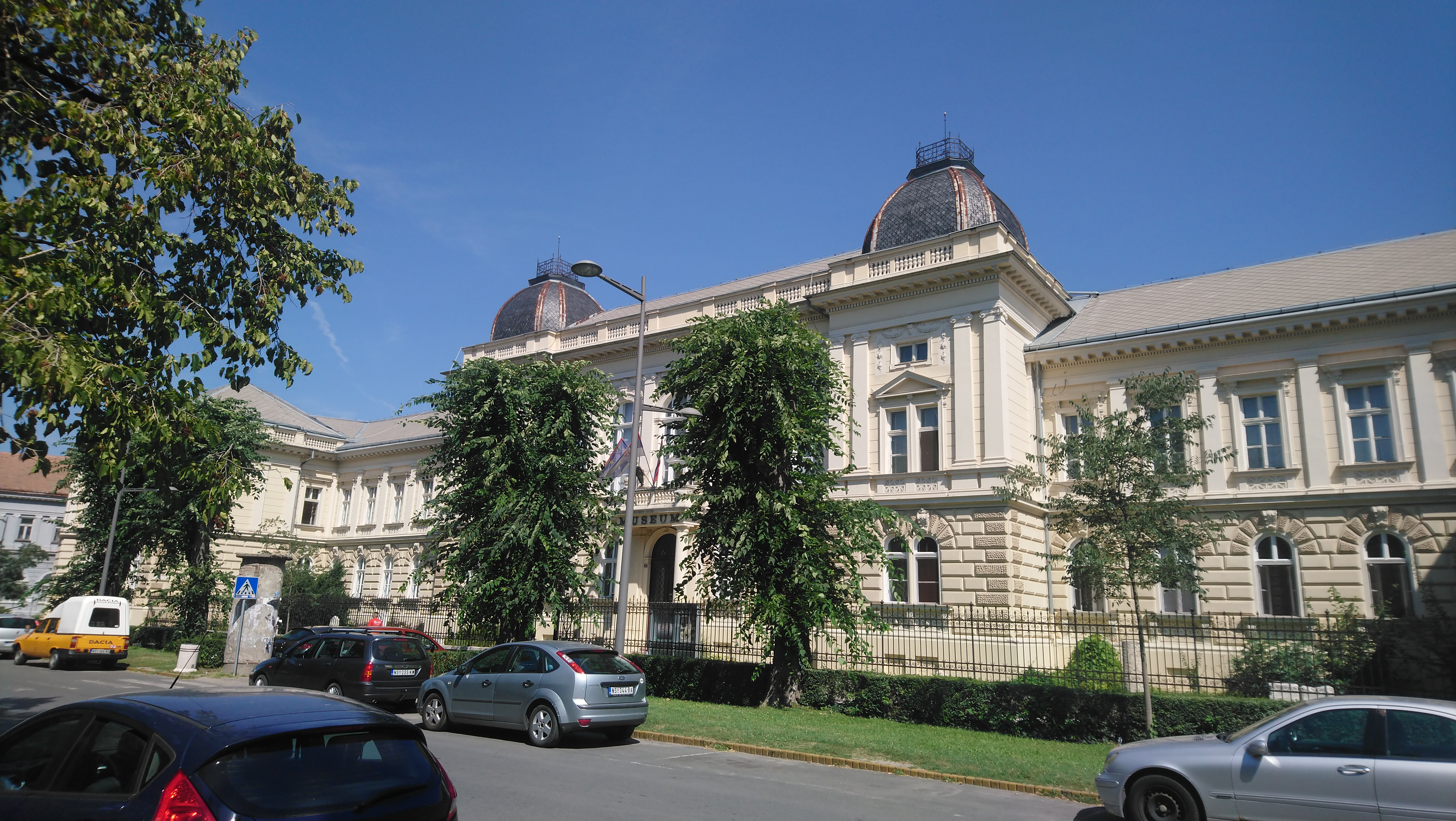
- Museum of Vojvodina
- Established: 14 October 1847; 178 years ago
- Location: Dunavska 35, Novi Sad, Serbia
- Coordinates: 45.256547°N 19.851756°E
- Website: www.muzejvojvodine.org.rs

The Museum of Vojvodina (Serbian Cyrillic: Музеј Војводине, Muzej Vojvodine) is an art and natural history museum in Novi Sad, Serbia. The museum houses a collection of over 400,000 specimens and a library of over 50,000 volumes.

== Notable paintings ==
Among others, the following paintings are located in the museum:

- 'Madonna with Child', by Paris Bordone
- 'Christ and Centurion', by Carlo Caliari
- 'Holy Mother with Christ', by Giulio Licinio
- 'Seneca', by Peter Paul Rubens (stolen)
- 'Vulcan's Mint', by Peter Paul Rubens
- 'Tentida gets weapons', by Peter Paul Rubens
- 'Self Portrait', by Rembrandt (stolen)
- 'Portrait of Man with Sword', by Palma Giovane
- 'Katon's Death', by Giovan Battista Langetti
- 'Resting Soldiers', by Alessandro Magnasco
- 'Holy Family with St. Ivan', by Cesare Gennari
- 'Queen Saba's Visiting', by Frans Francken the Younger
- 'Magdalena with Dead Christ', by Marco Antonio Bassetti
- 'Flowers', by Jan van Huysum
- 'Portrait of Vitoria della Rovera', by Justus Sustermans

== Gallery ==
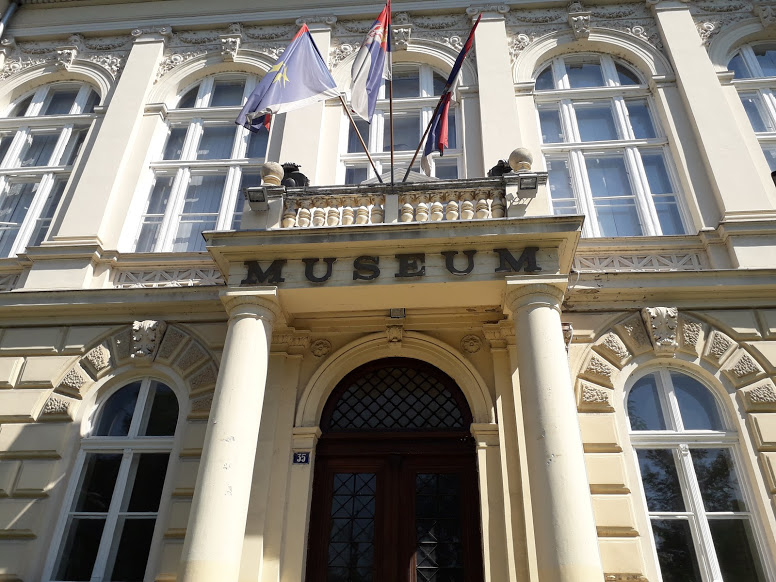
Museum of Vojvodina (entrance)

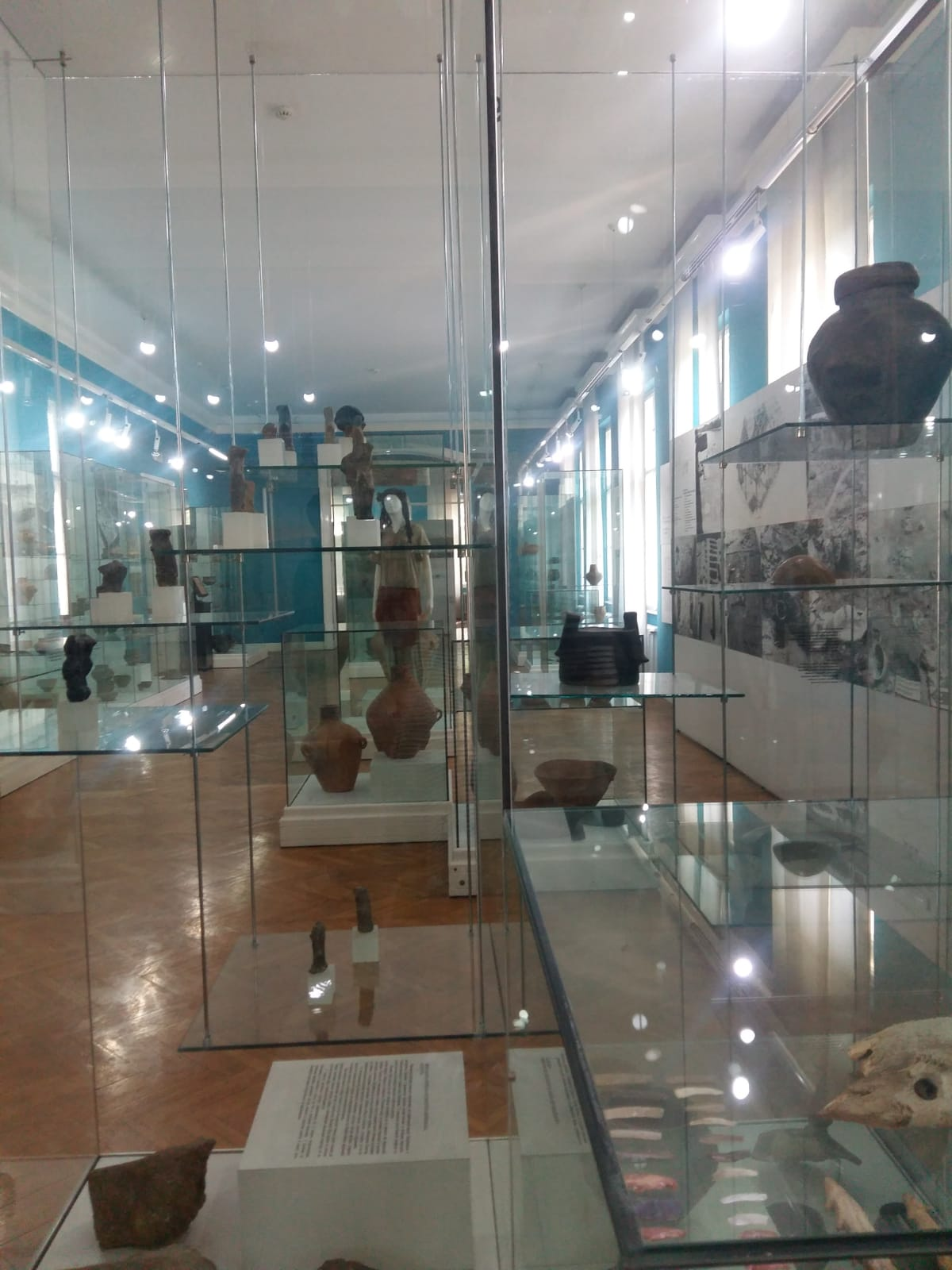
Museum of Vojvodina (interior exhibits)

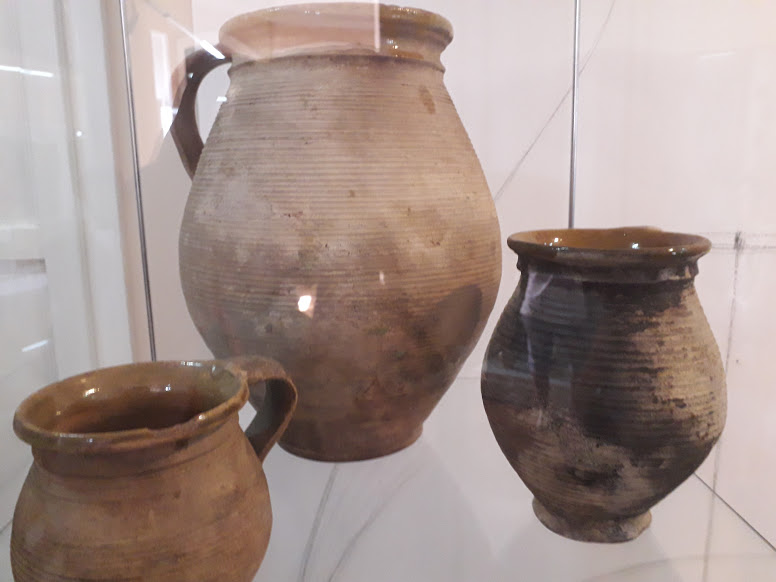
Cooking pans (ceramics) in Museum of Vojvodina, second half of the 19th century

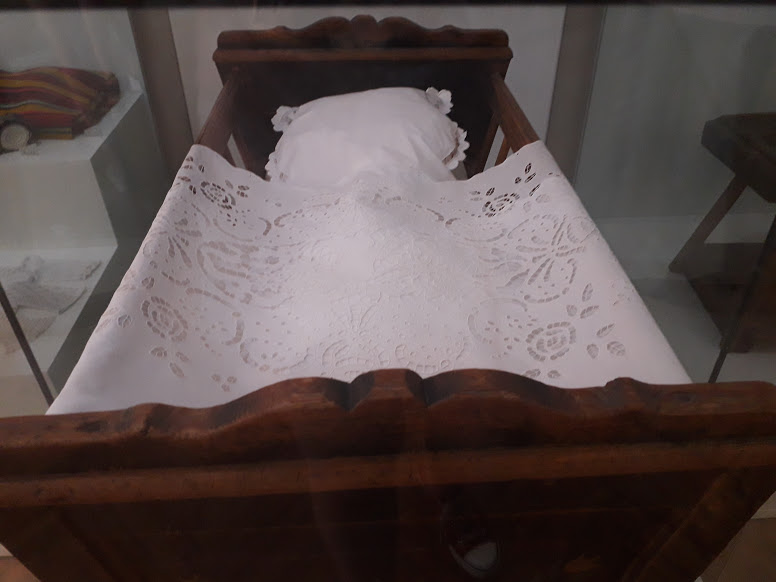
Cradle and cradle bedding in Museum of Vojvodina

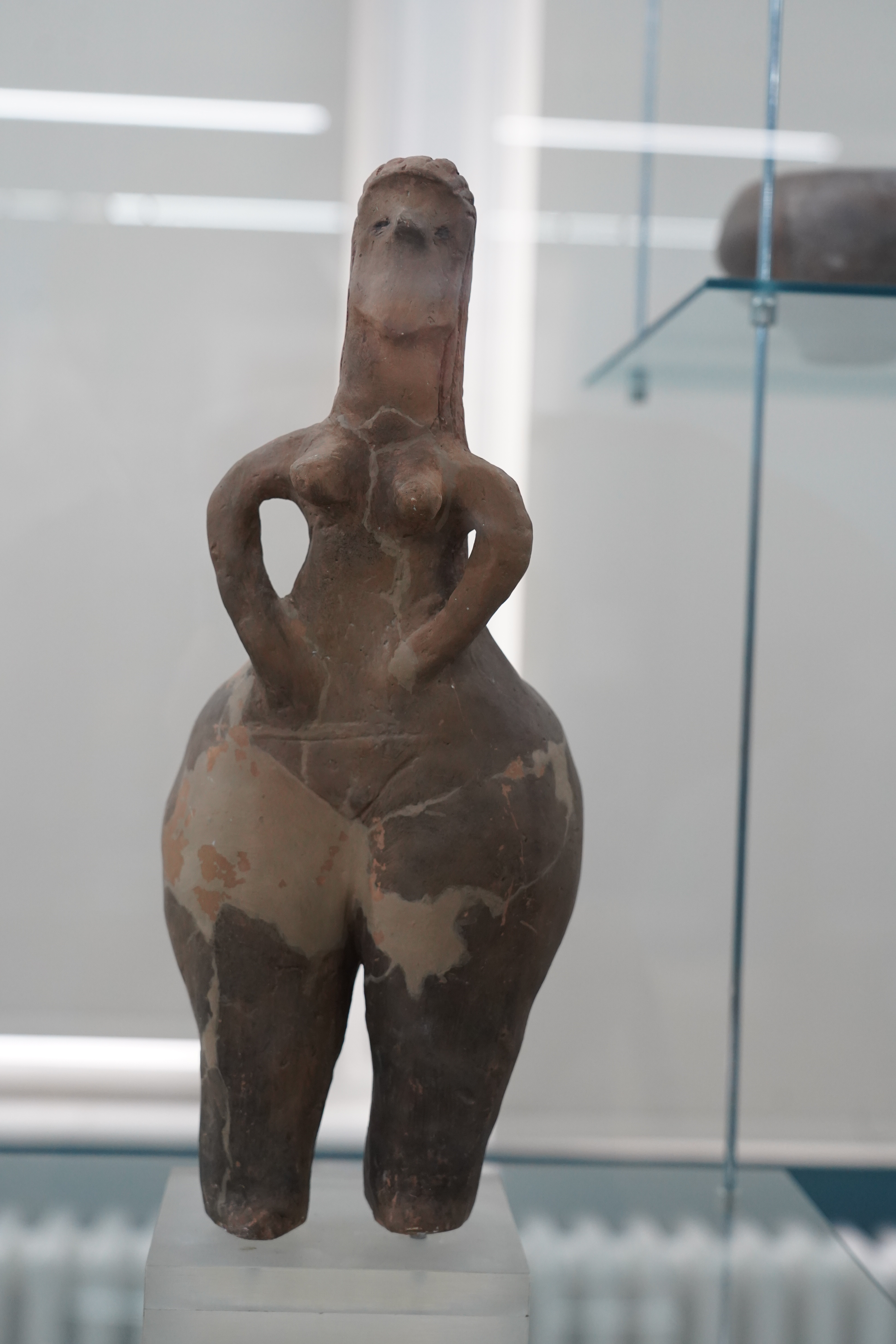
Prehistoric Fertility Deity statue

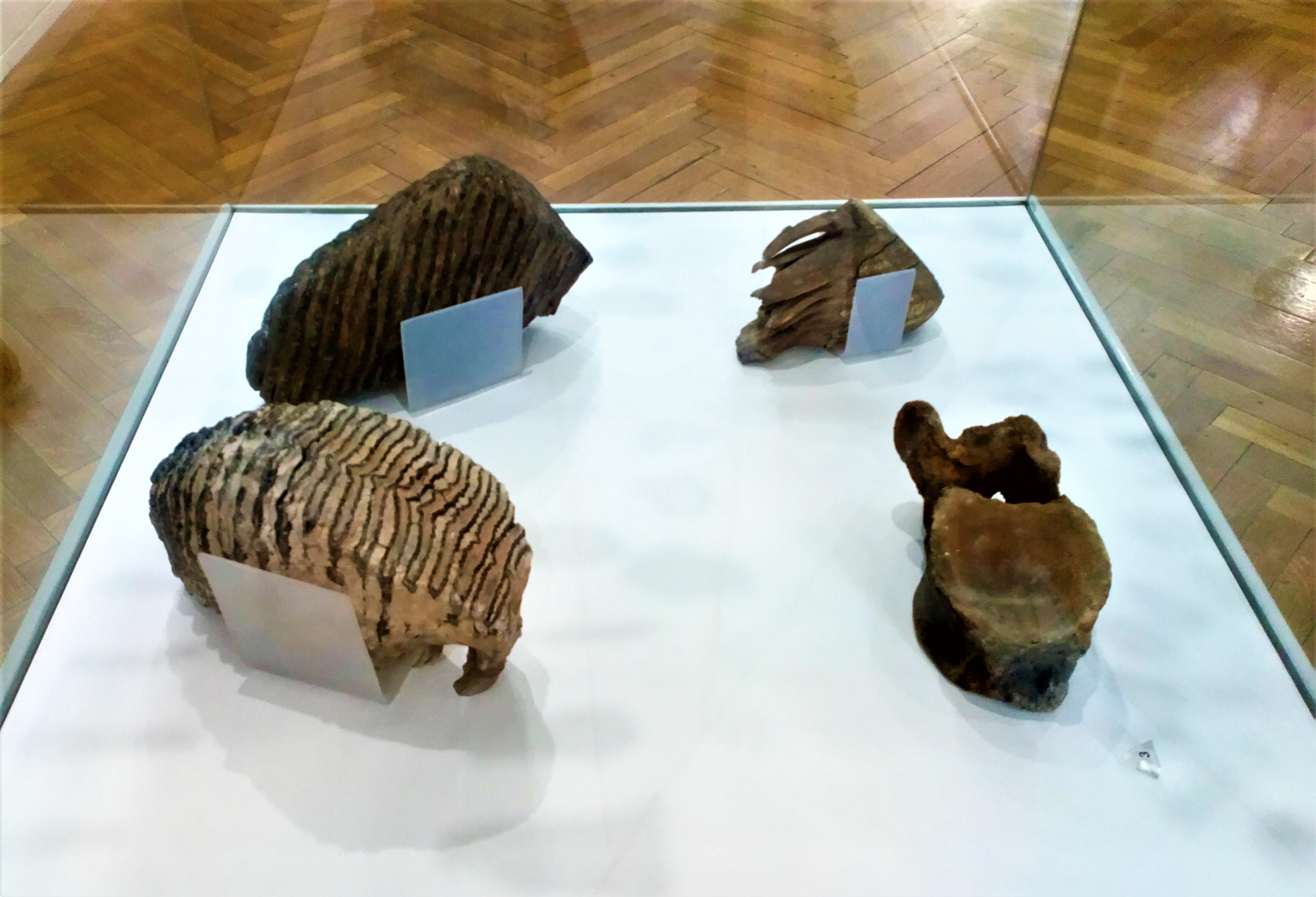
Teeth and bones of mammoth

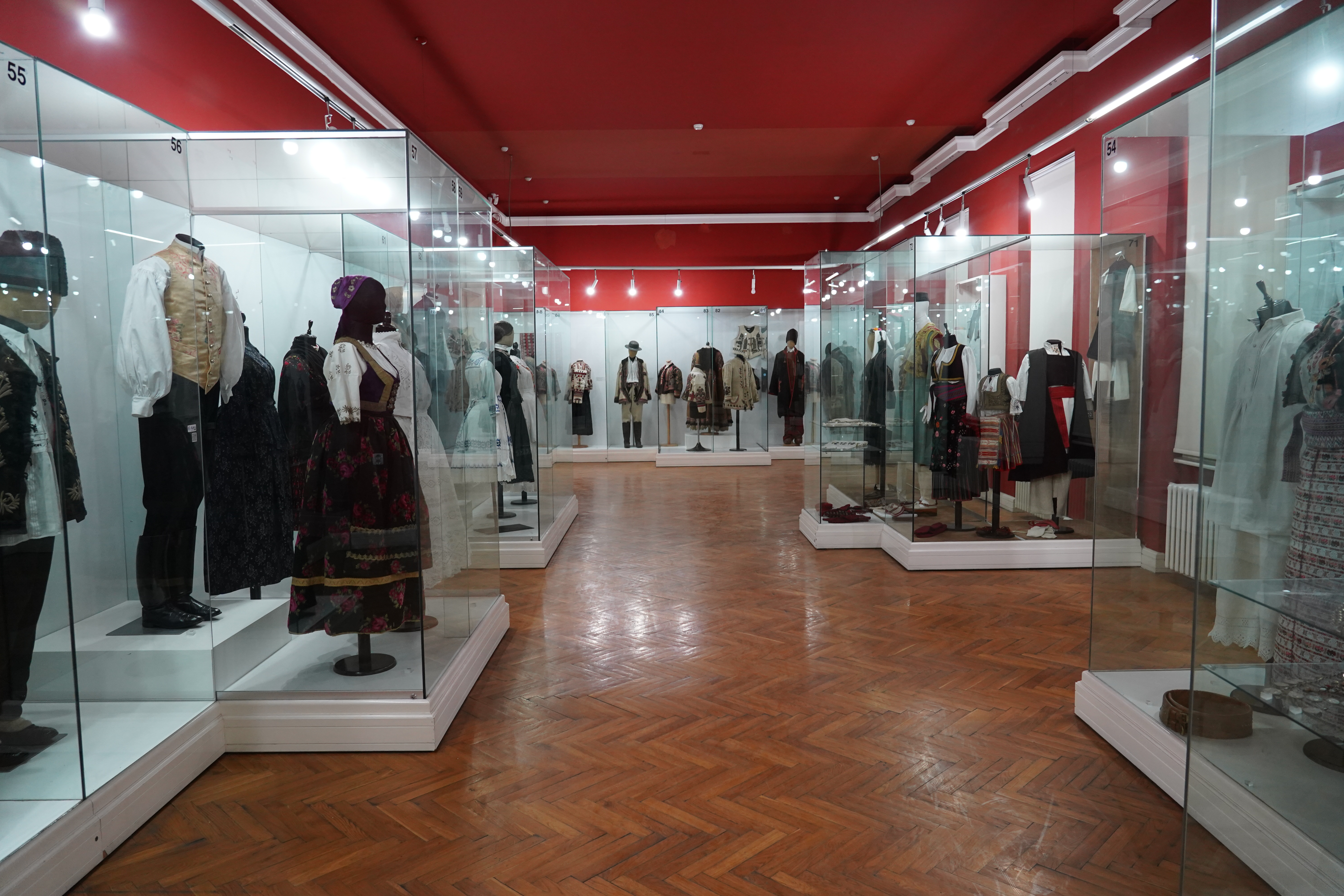
Traditional ethnic clothing from the 19th century

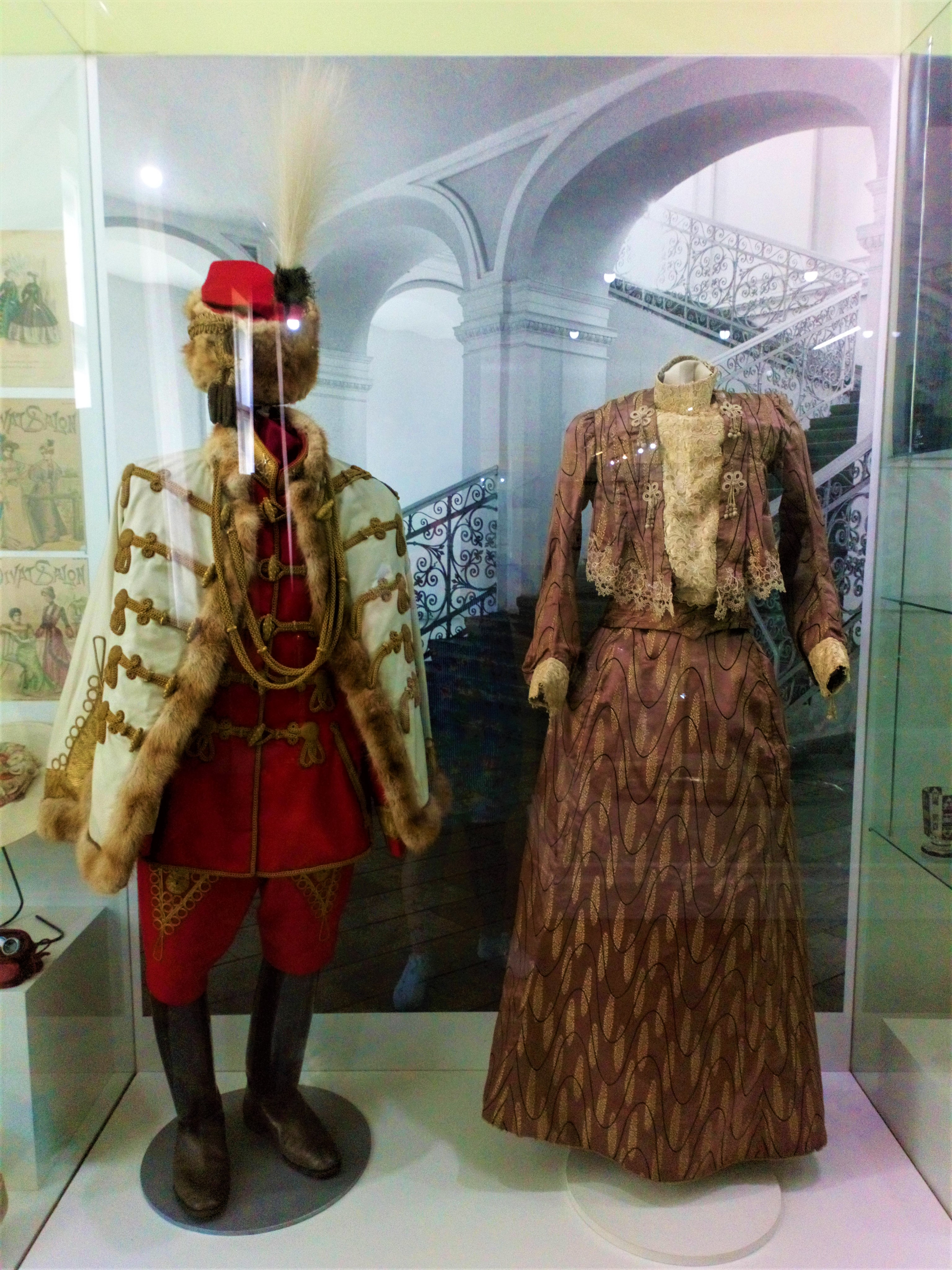
City and military clothing from 19th century

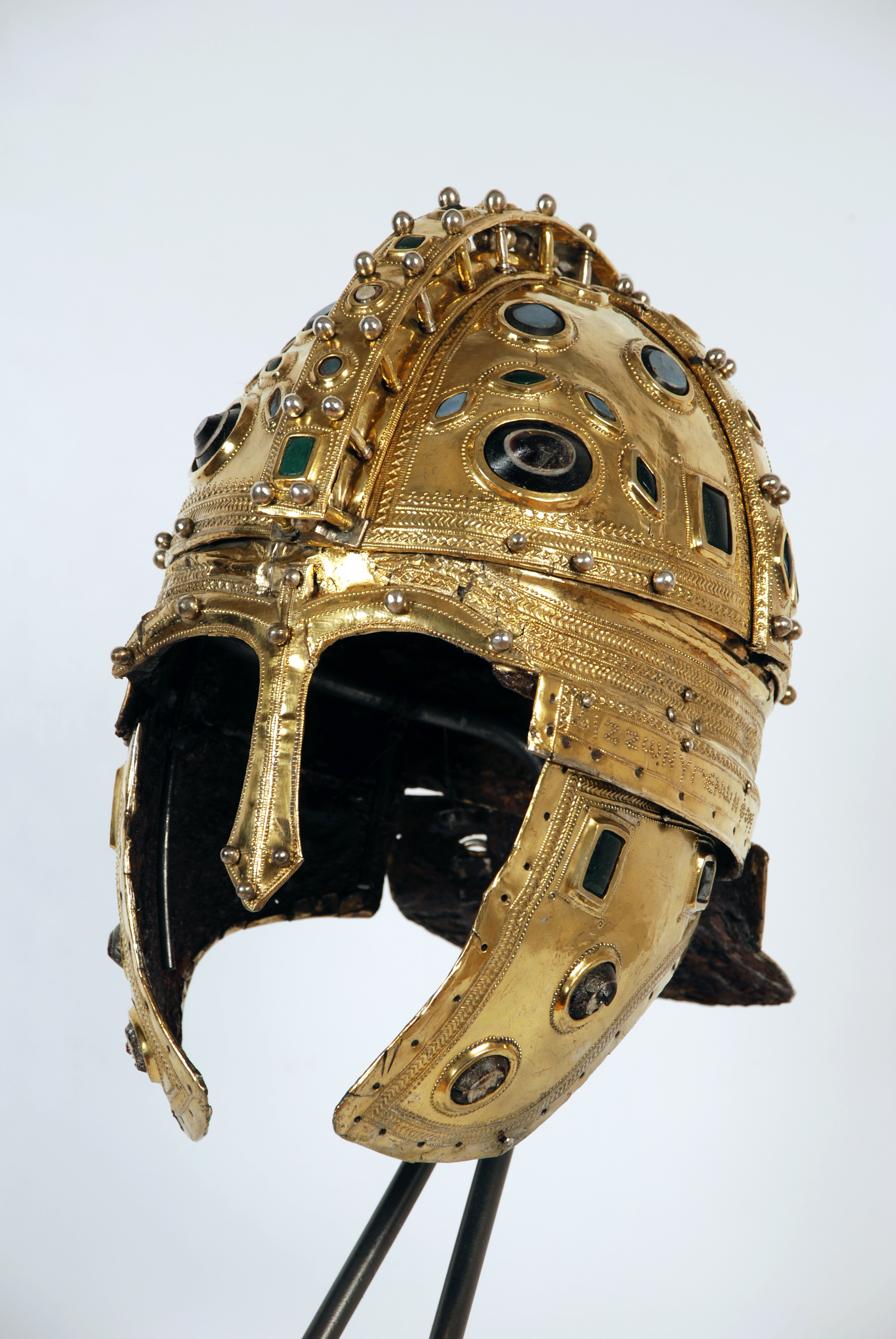
Late Roman Helmet 4th century A.D.

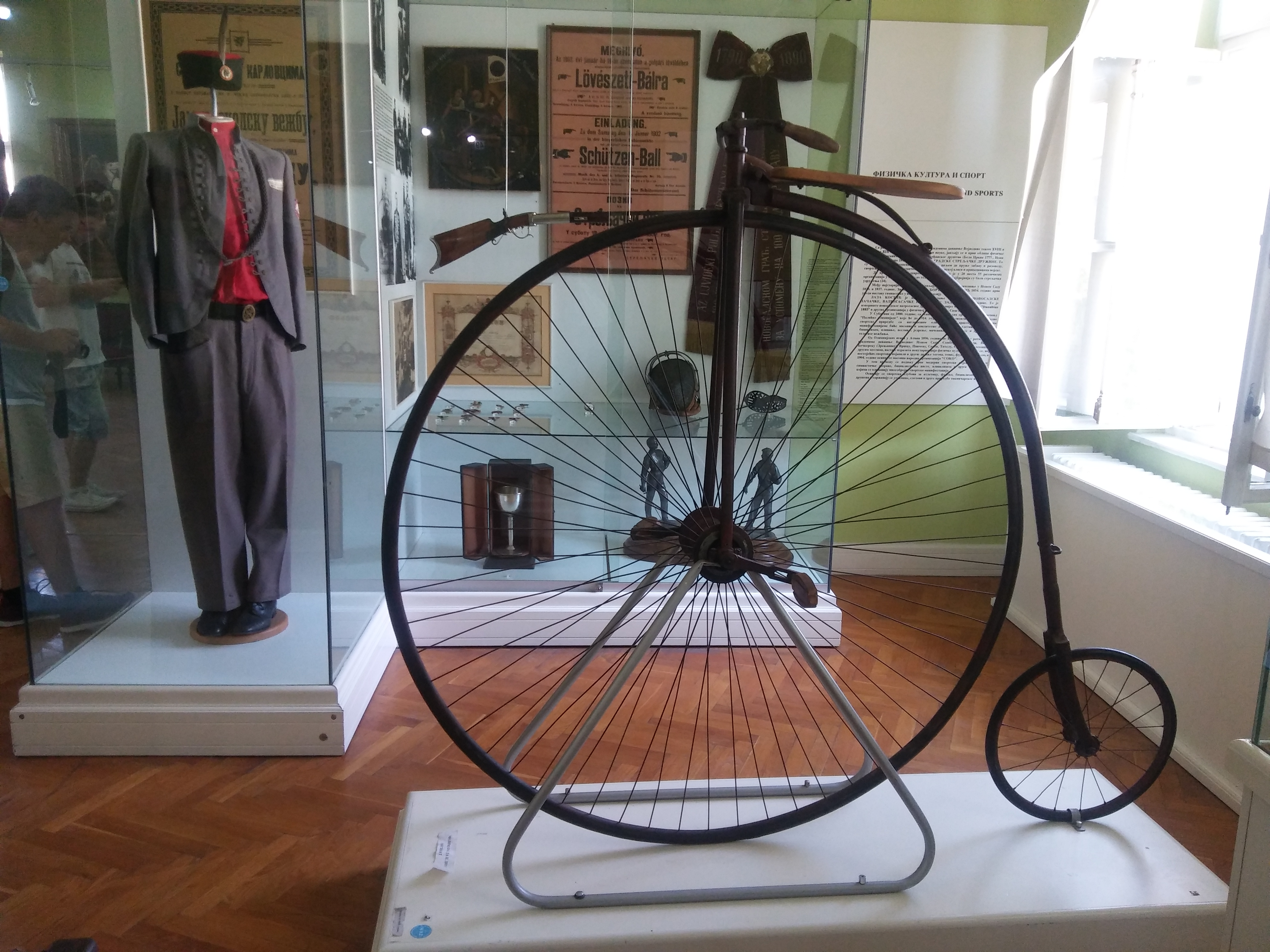
Exhibit of velociped

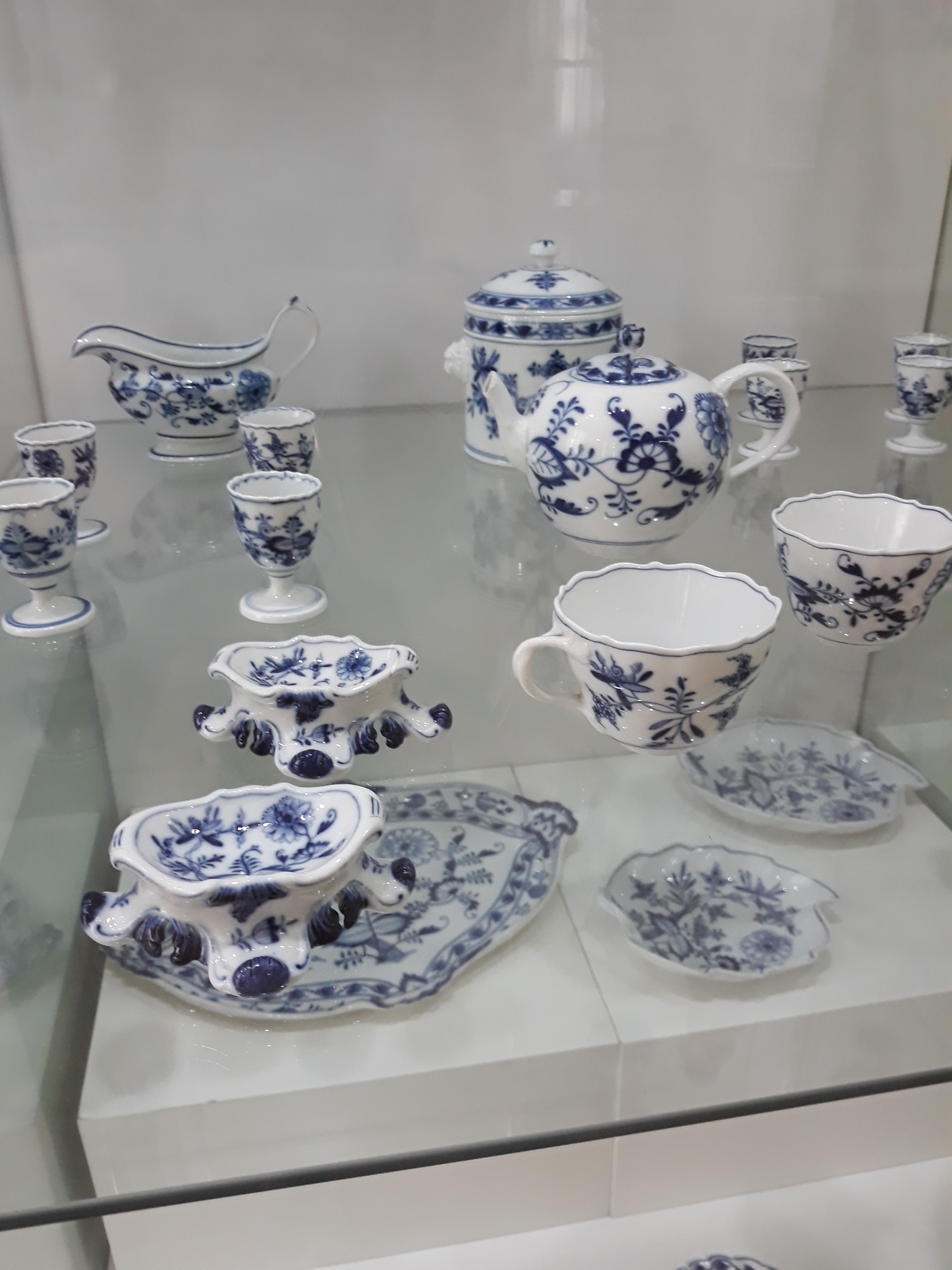
Vintage tea set

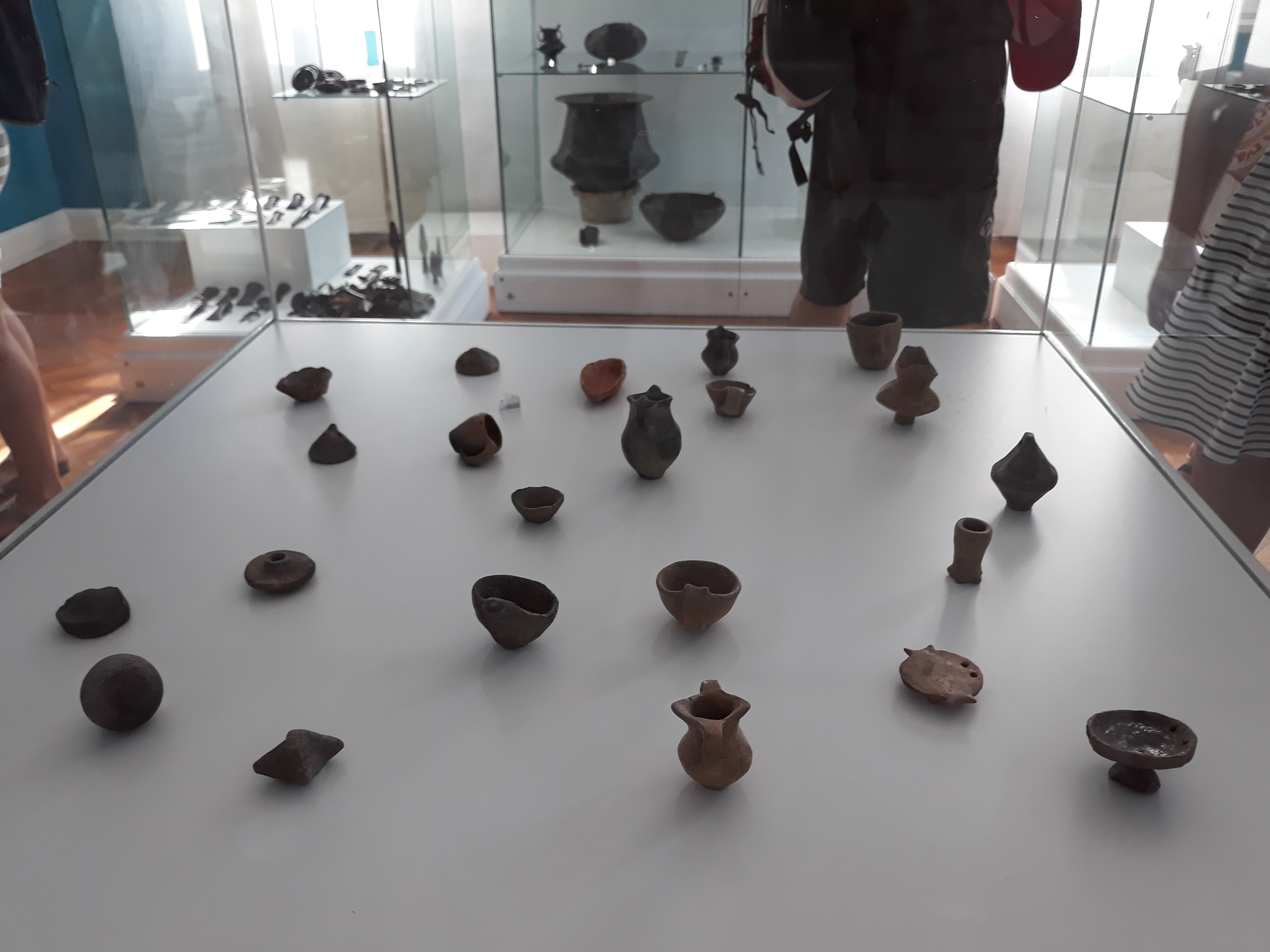
Toys from clay

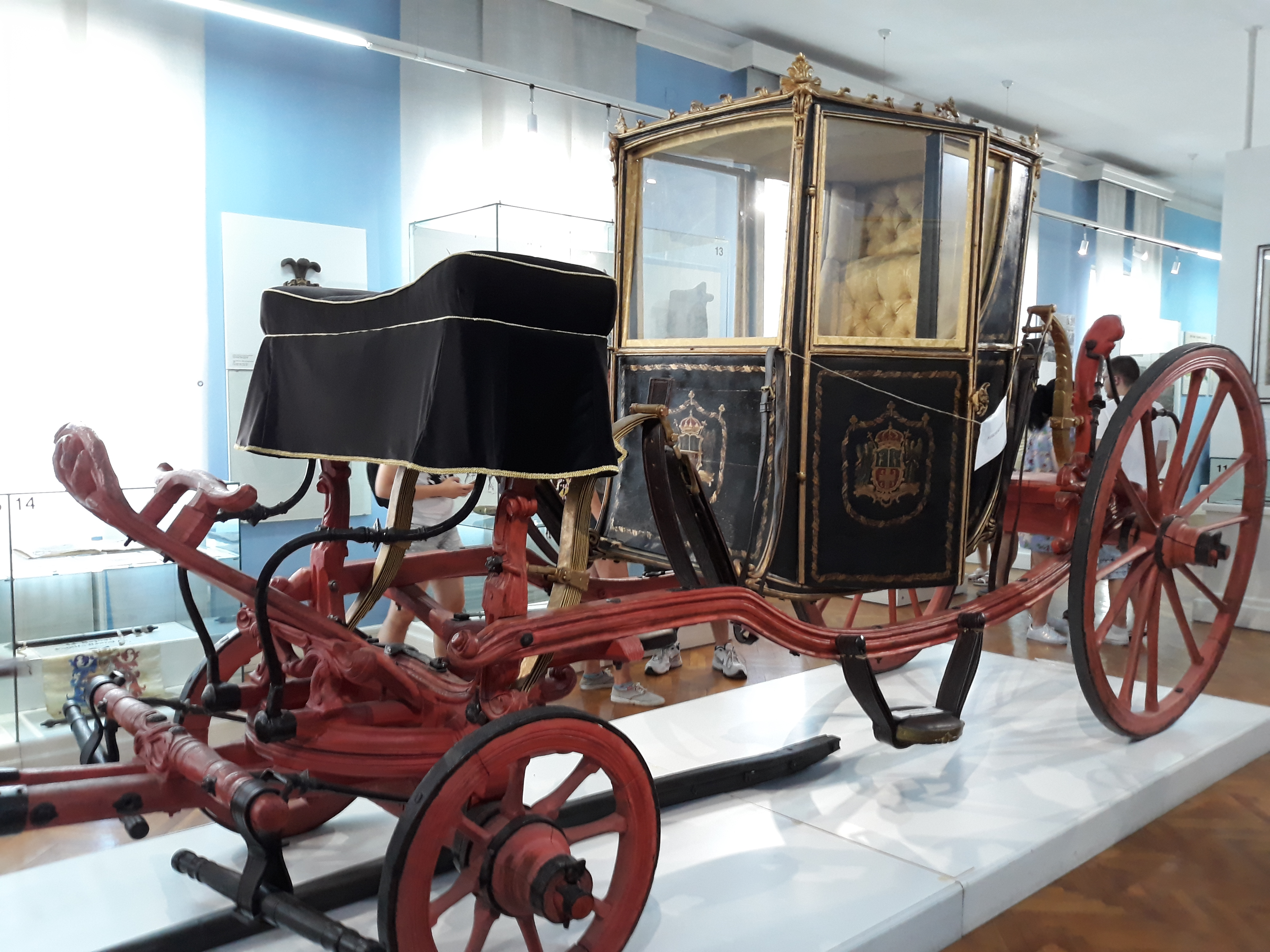
Carriages

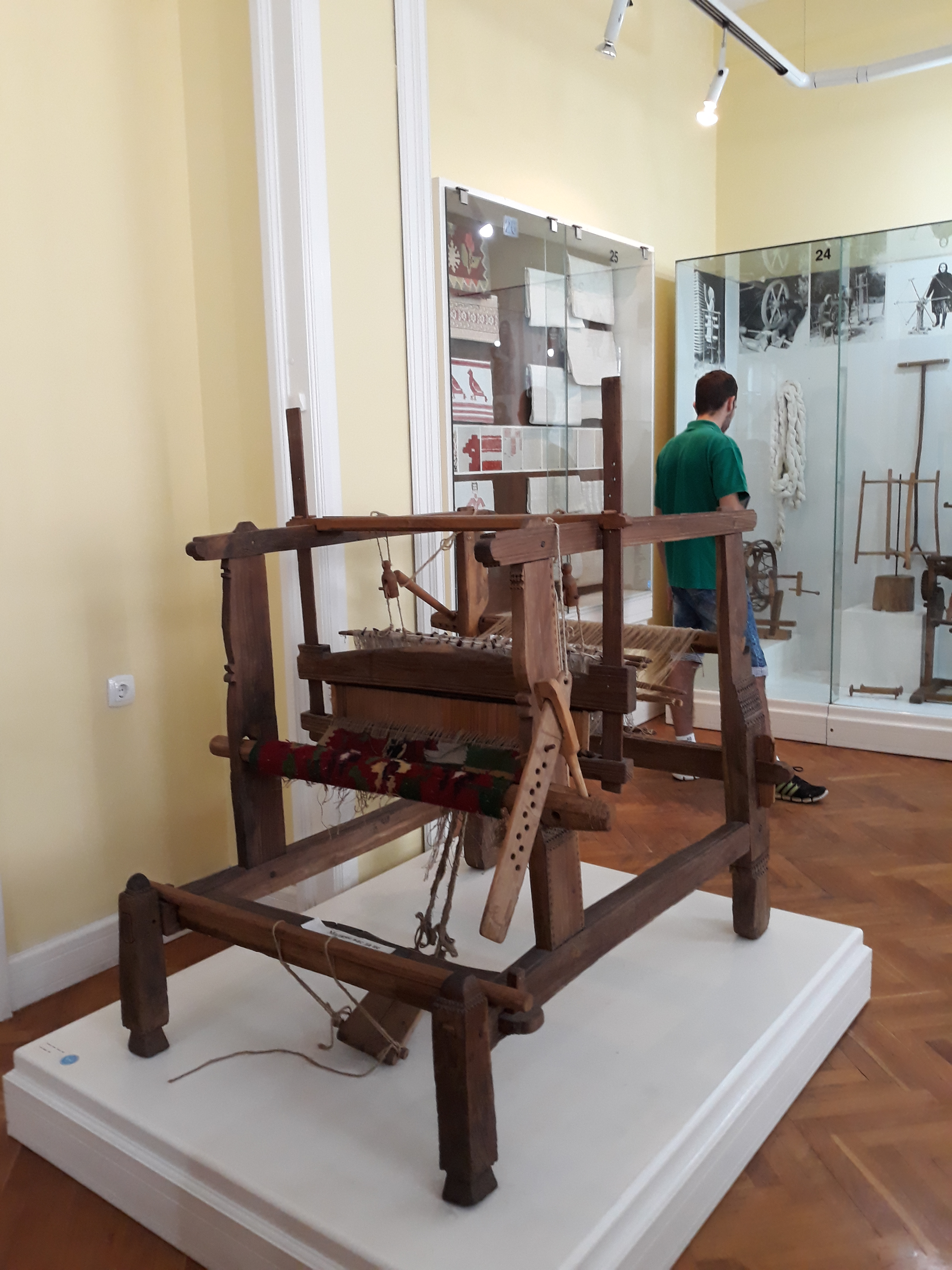
Exhibit in the Museum

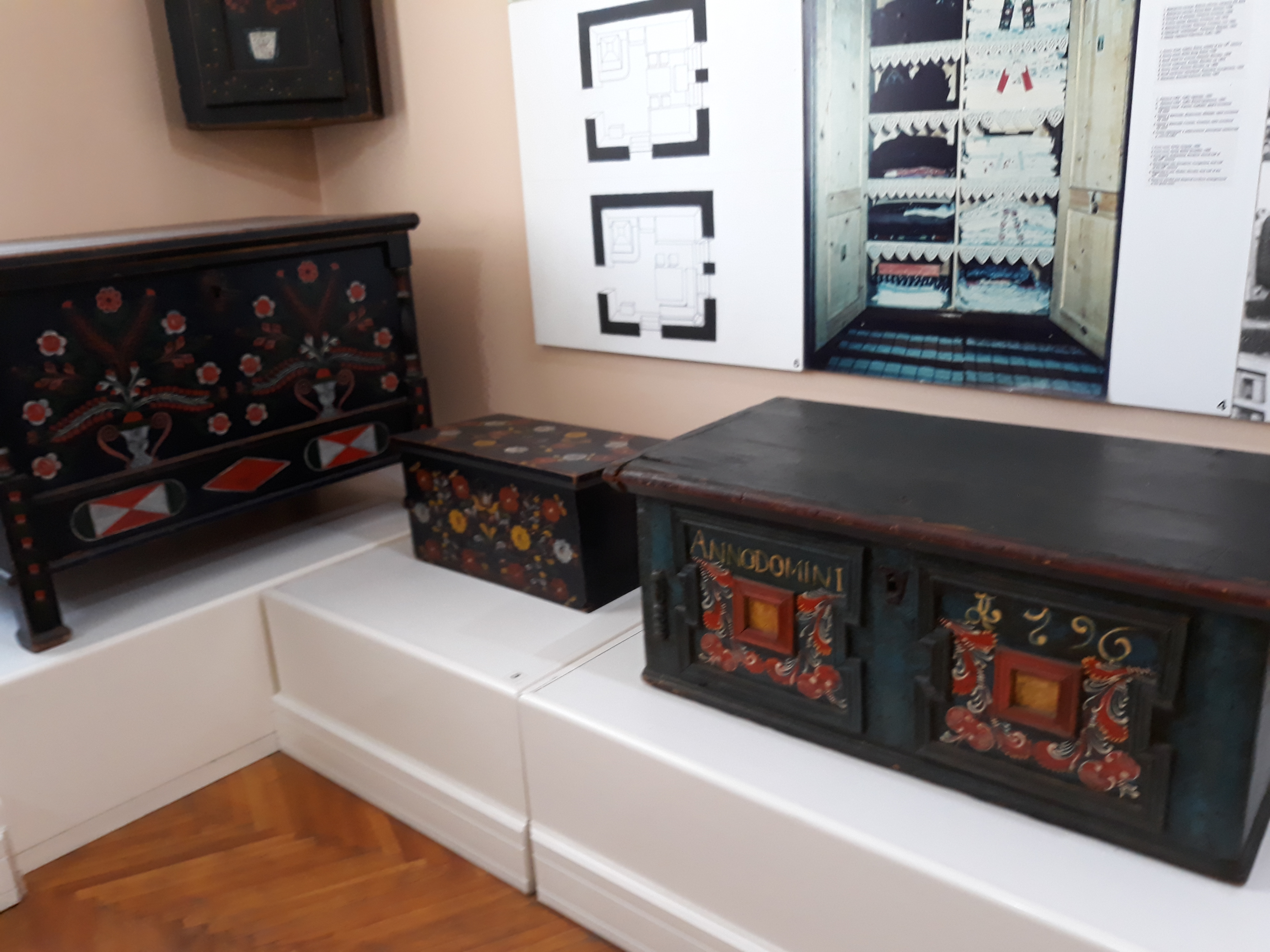
Exhibits in the Museum

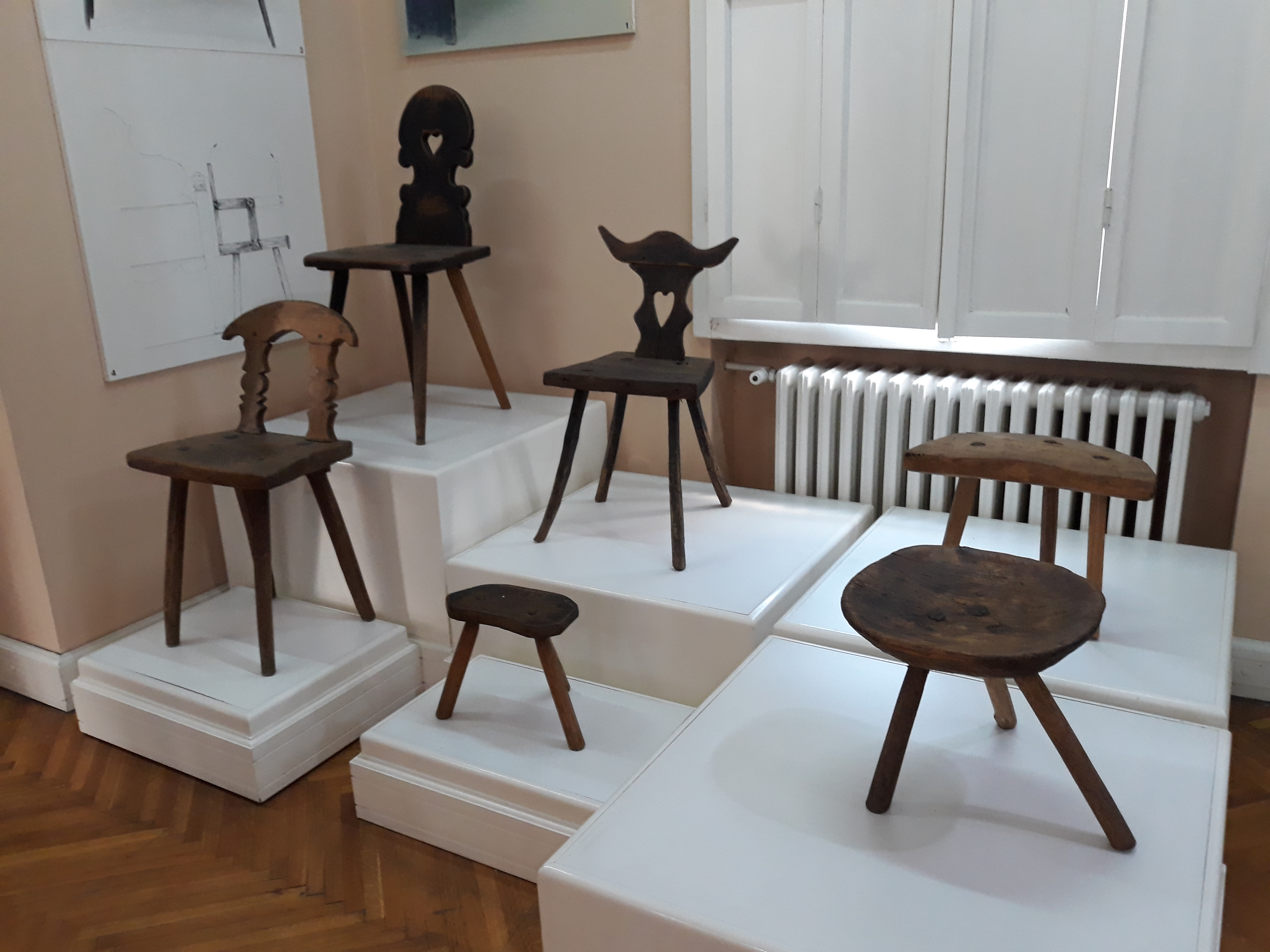
Collection of chairs

== See also ==
- List of museums in Serbia
