= Alessandro Scalzi =

Italian painter

Alessandro Scalzi (died c. 1596, in Munich) was an Italian painter. All his surviving works are now in Bavaria.

== Life ==
Known as 'il Paduano' (the Paduan) despite actually being born in Florence, he was a relative (possibly brother-in-law) of Friedrich Sustris, with whom he collaborated on several works in Augsburg, Munich, Kirchheim and especially the Burg Trausnitz in Landshut. The Burg contains his most notable works, the 1578 Narrentreppe or Ladder of Fools, a staircase with life-size commedia dell'arte frescoes by Scalzi and Sustris along the stairwell and its ceiling and grotesque masks of Pantalone and Zanni by Antonio Ponzano. The work is based on an actual Italian theatre troupe which performed at the wedding feast of William V of Bavaria and Renata of Lorraine.

His other works include two panels of St Peter and St Paul for an altarpiece at the parish church in Landsberg am Lech. He collaborated with Christoph Schwartz on martyrdoms of Saint Andrew and Saint Ursula for the Michelkirche in Munich. Scalzi also collaborated with Pieter de Witte on The Penitent Magdalene destroyed in 1945 during the Second World War.
