= Merrill Chase Galleries =

Former fine art business in Chicago

- Merged into: Fine Arts Group Ltd; Art Renaissance Inc.
- Formation: 1964; 62 years ago
- Dissolved: 1987; 39 years ago
- Type: Art dealership
- Staff: 150+ (1978)

Merrill Chase Galleries was an art dealership in Chicago, Illinois. It was started in 1964 by Robert Merrill Chase Sr., and his father, Merrill Chase. By 1978 it had more than 150 employees and 13 galleries, and was among the largest organizations of its kind in the United States.

In 1987 it was sold to Fine Arts Group Ltd., a company owned by the Pritzker family of Chicago, who in 1997 sold it to Art Renaissance Inc. of New York for an undisclosed sum.

== The founders and early years ==
In the early 1960s, Bob Chase began developing a plan for a fine art gallery. He had recently graduated from the University of Wisconsin–Madison and convinced his father, Merrill Chase, who owned a portrait photography business, to join him in opening a fine art gallery that would focus on emerging artists, mid-career artists, and works of art on paper by masters. Bob also wanted to be among the first fine art galleries in the suburbs. According to Bob Chase, “We were pioneers, mavericks. People were moving to the suburbs and building homes. We were at the birth of that movement.”

The first Merrill Chase gallery opened in 1964 as a combined art gallery and photo studio located in a new suburban mall called Oakbrook Terrace (later Oakbrook Center) in Oak Brook, Illinois. Oakbrook Terrace was then the second largest mall in the United States, and featured an open-air format, elegant gardens, boutique shops and upscale department stores.^{[} This was a departure from the manner in which traditional fine art galleries operated in Chicago. Many were downtown appointment-only showrooms that catered to people of means. As Chase explained, “Galleries were designed for the privileged few — and the idea of going into a gallery was frightening to people. If you didn’t have a lot of money and knowledge, you were made to feel uncomfortable. You'd walk in and feel like whispering. At the other end of the spectrum were department and furniture stores selling wall decor. Our idea was to offer good art in various price ranges and somehow find a way of making it more accessible.”

The first Merrill Chase gallery was opened with a modest investment. According to Bob Chase, “We borrowed $20,000 to start, and the leasehold improvements were $22,000, so we were $2,000 in the hole.” With some additional capital, Chase bought a few works on paper by Dali and Picasso, borrowed pieces and opened the doors with a modest inventory.

The gallery business took off and the company formally became Merrill Chase Galleries Ltd in 1965, with Bob Chase as president and Merrill Chase as honorary chairman of the board. Thirteen years later, in 1978, Merrill Chase Galleries had 13 locations with over 150 staff members.

== Business expansion ==
From 1969 through 1988, Merrill Chase Galleries added suburban locations and locations in Chicago: opening in River Oaks Center, Calumet City, Illinois in 1969; Old Orchard Shopping Center (now Westfield Old Orchard), Skokie, Illinois, in 1970; Hawthorn Center (now Hawthorn Mall), Vernon Hills, Illinois, in 1975; Westfield Fox Valley (now Fox Valley Mall) in Aurora, Illinois, in 1975; Water Tower Place, Chicago, in 1976; Woodfield Mall, Schaumburg, Illinois, in 1977; Orland Square, Orland Park, Illinois, in 1978; the Merchandise Mart, Chicago, in 1980; and First National Bank Plaza, (now Chase Tower), Chicago, in 1982. The business also expanded nationally, with locations in the Fashion Show Mall, in 1980, in Las Vegas; in Atlanta, Georgia in 1989; Georgetown, Washington D.C., in 1990; and three locations in Hawaii on the islands of Oahu, Kauai, and Maui in 1990. In addition, the company opened art boutiques in Chicago: The ARTique and Gallery Moya in 1984; and Gallery Lara in 1988. Corporate offices were in Northbrook, Illinois, opening in 1980.

The ARTique art boutiques were designed to entice customers into Merrill Chase Galleries and to provide a platform for local artists to showcase their work. The boutiques initially opened at galleries in Woodfield Mall, Oakbrook Center and Water Tower Place. The ARTique featured Henri de Toulouse-Lautrec tea towels,Salvador Dalí address books, Pablo Picasso pillows and aprons, playing cards illustrated with copies of Michelangelo drawings, as well as affordable objets d’art such as artist-designed jewelry, art glass and silk scarves. According to Moya Chase, who managed the ARTiques, "the boutiques met the Merrill Chase philosophy of making art available to more people at affordable prices. The whole idea is that this is a fun place where you can browse, touch things and learn a little more about art.”

== Influencing the fine art business ==
As one of the largest fine art dealers in the country from the mid-1970s to the late 1980s, Merrill Chase Galleries challenged conventional gallery practices, including where to locate fine art galleries, purchasing art directly from the artist, marketing and advertising art, creating gallery events that featured the artist, and providing customers with "a friendly, transparent buying experience."

The business approach was based on connecting "the artist’s passion to create; the collector’s passion to acquire; and the dealer’s passion to promote and support both.” The three elements of this artistic passion were influenced by noted art dealers Leo Castelli and Ambroise Vollard, and collectors including Iris Cantor and B. Gerald Cantor and Roy Neuberger. According to Bob Chase, careful attention was required to keep the interests of artist, dealer and collector in balance.” Neuberger described the role of the gallery owner as “extremely important to the careers of artists they represented. We might have known nothing about the greatest artists of our time had they not had dealers who believed in them and worked tirelessly to see that they reached the audience they deserved.”

Bob Chase was the principle art buyer for all the galleries and he traveled extensively with his wife, Moya, both in the United States and abroad to meet with internationally known as well as relatively undiscovered artists. As Bob Chase explained when discussing how buying decisions were made: "I don't have an exact set of criteria I check. It's not that studied; it's more intuitive. When I see something that I think is right, it's like a bell going off."

In most cases, art was purchased outright from an artist or dealer rather than following the standard gallery practice of taking the art on consignment and paying the artist only if the work was sold. According to Bob Chase, “If we believe in an artist strongly enough to represent him in our galleries, we should make a total commitment to that person." Purchasing the art upfront was beneficial for the artist or dealer, the gallery, and the consumer: artists received immediate revenue, and for that reason they would often reserve their best works at their best prices for Merrill Chase Galleries, thus allowing the galleries to offer customers a wide selection at favorable prices.

As examples, in 1975, Merrill Chase Galleries secured the sole right to display $2.75 million worth of paintings and original mixed media prints by Salvador Dalí. In 1979, the business acquired a complete set of Pablo Picasso's "Vollard Suite," 100 etchings created from 1930 to 1937. More than 300 sets of the Vollard Suite were printed. That same year, Merrill Chase Galleries purchased the complete set of 105 hand-colored and hand-signed Bible-themed etchings illustrating scenes from the "Old Testament," that Marc Chagall completed between 1931 and 1956.

To support and promote the relationship between collector and artist, Merrill Chase Galleries staff was trained on the artists, art history, printmaking, and current art trends. To make the galleries more inviting to customers and to make purchasing art less intimidating, the price was clearly placed on each piece of art, which was not a common practice. In addition, Chase provided certificates of authenticity and offered a five-year full exchange privilege.

Merrill Chase Galleries was among the first to announce exhibitions through large display and full-page advertisements in newspapers, was the first to place full-page advertisements in national magazines, such as TIME and Playboy, and the first to conduct major radio and television campaigns.

The business was also a pioneer in using direct mail to reach fine art buyers. A Chase newsletter, ArtSeen, was published on a regular basis and distributed to 30,000 selected customers who had previously purchased art or exhibited an interest in the gallery. The newsletter showcased articles about popular artists at the gallery and provided prices of their work along with photos from recent auctions and events. The company published a brochure, The Story of Prints, explaining the terminology of fine prints and describing printmaking techniques. Merrill Chase Galleries also offered printmaking demonstrations, provided tours for schoolchildren, and supported public service projects such as lectures to nonprofit groups and auctions for charitable organizations. In 1972, Merrill Chase Galleries endorsed and promoted the fine print law in Illinois, designed to protect the buyer, and announced an annual scholarship open to all art students in the Chicago area.

== Adapting to an evolving fine art market ==
Throughout the 1970s, Merrill Chase Galleries benefited from people buying original art as a hedge against inflation. At the time, the stock market was down, real estate prices were lagging, and the value of the U.S. dollar was declining — but select artwork was increasing in value — and Merrill Chase Galleries developed a following among the public, investors and businesses. Chase observed that in the 10 years since he and his father started the business, sales had grown “from the $100,000 range at the very beginning to many millions.”

Another factor driving the value of fine art was an influx of Japanese investors and a rapidly growing Japanese economy. In 1973, Chase noted that on art buying trips to London, Paris, Venice, Milan, Rome, and Barcelona, Japanese buyers had “cleaned out his regular sources of art — artists as well as dealers.” In response, the company decided to take $250,000 worth of art to Tokyo, Japan including works by American artists and European masters, including Donald Zolan, LeRoy Neiman, Robert Addison, Robert Kipniss, Peter Max, Francisco Goya, Pierre-Auguste Renoir, and Rembrandt.

In the 1980s, corporate demand became so great that Merrill Chase Galleries opened a corporate sales division, Art for Business, in the Merchandise Mart in Chicago. Customers included architects, space planners, interior designers and office managers "who were furnishing new offices or sprucing up old ones." Chase also formed a national sales division in 1980, and within a few months reported establishing accounts with art dealers in markets outside Chicago, including other U.S. cities, London and Paris.

== Gallery events ==
Throughout the 1970s and 1980s, Merrill Chase Galleries created newsworthy public events. Two events of particular interest were exhibits held 18 years apart featuring the art of John Lennon. The first exhibit, “Bag One,” was held at the gallery in Oak Brook, Illinois in 1970, and featured 14 lithographs by Lennon, depicted Lennon and Yoko Ono on their honeymoon in 1969 at the presidential suite (Room 702) at the Amsterdam Hilton. Some of the drawings were erotic in nature, as described by the Chicago Sun-Times, and although the exhibit was restricted to adults 21 and over, law enforcement officers obtained a search warrant to confiscate the items for court proceedings. After a hearing, the DuPage County Chief Circuit Judge Bert J. Rathje found the works to be obscene and ordered them confiscated and burned. The artwork was burned on June 3, 1970.

Eighteen years later, in 1988, “Bag One” images were again on display at Merrill Chase Galleries for an exhibition called “Imagine.” However, rather than confiscate the art, the police were on hand to control the crowds. Yoko Ono had selected more than 40 of her late husband's works for the exhibition, including “Bed-Ins for Peace,” a drawing commemorating their media-event honeymoon, "Rabbits Rabbiting," "The Embrace," and "Bag One." Some designs were copied onto T-shirts, aprons, coffee mugs, posters and other items for sale in the ARTiques during the exhibit. Yoko Ono made personal appearances at gallery locations, and the exhibit received extensive press coverage.

== Merrill Chase Publishing ==
In addition to publishing limited edition fine prints by artists, Merrill Chase Galleries published exhibition catalogs, including Rediscovered Printmakers of the 19th Century, 1978; Manuel Robbe: 1872-1936, featuring 100 color aquatints, 1979; a catalog of Rembrandt etchings, 1979; Henri-Charles Guérard, 1846-1897, 108 original prints, 1981; and Robert William Addison, forty years of realism, 1982.

== Sale of the galleries and boutiques ==
In 1987, after 25 years in business, Merrill Chase Galleries was acquired by Fine Arts Group Ltd., a company owned by the Pritzker family of Chicago. The purchase, for an undisclosed amount, included Chicago area galleries located in Water Tower Place, Woodfield Mall and Oakbrook Center as well as corporate offices and a distribution center in Northbrook, Illinois, Gallery Moya, and Gallery Lara, that was scheduled to open December 1 in the newly opened Avenue Atrium in Chicago (now 900 North Michigan Shops. Bob Chase continued as CEO and President of the gallery business for five years. In 1997, Merrill Chase Galleries was sold to Art Renaissance Inc. of New York for an undisclosed sum.

== Gallery relationships with Salvador Dali and Frederick Hart ==
=== Salvador Dali ===
In 1969, Salvador Dalí and Merrill Chase Galleries began a collaboration following meetings with Bob Chase. The artist took a liking to Bob and dubbed him “Mr. Chicago,” a nickname that stuck throughout their collaborative years.

In 1970, Dalí was commissioned by Merrill Chase Galleries to create four drypoint etchings, collectively entitled "Visions of Chicago" The suite was composed of personal interpretations by Dali of four Chicago landmarks that defined the city and its spirit: Buckingham Fountain, the Art Institute of Chicago, the Museum of Science & Industry and the Chicago Water Tower. The complete set of the "Visions of Chicago" is in the collection of the Art Institute of Chicago, a gift of Merrill Chase Gallieries.

In the early 1970s, being aware of Dalí's interests in and admiration for Leonardo da Vinci and his conceptual scientific and futuristic thinking, Bob Chase suggested to Dali it was time to give the world Dalí's own vision of things to come. In response, Dalí proclaimed, “Bravo! Dalí will create the future.” The deal involved a commission for Dalí to create 10 original paintings and a suite of 10 mixed media graphics entitled "Imaginations and Objects of The Future."

At a press conference on March 6, 1975, Dalí unveiled one of his 10 "Imaginations and Objects of the Future" a painting titled,"Spectacles with Holograms and Computers for Seeing Imagined Objects." The complete collection was sold through Merrill Chase Galleries and dealers throughout the world and the complete set of the etchings is in the collection of the Art Institute of Chicago, a gift of Merrill Chase Gallery.

=== Frederick Hart ===
Bob Chase of Merrill Chase Galleries was the primary publisher of Frederick Hart's work in sculpture from 1980 until Hart's death in 1999 at the age of 55. The association began when Bob Chase read about Hart in an art journal, Horizon Magazine, which featured a clay model for Hart's "Ex Nihilo" (Out of Nothing) for the center tympanum of The Creation Sculptures ensemble on the west facade of Washington National Cathedral. Bob Chase sought a meeting with Hart and the two men became longtime friends and collaborators and Merrill Chase Galleries became one of Frederick Hart's most important dealers.

== Selected bibliography ==
- Chase, Robert, “Transcending Tradition: The Cast Acrylic Resin works,” Frederick Hart, Sculptor, Hudson Hills press, 1994, pages 73–80, ISBN 1-55595-120-1
- Chase, Robert, “Preface,” Frederick Hart, Changing Tides, Hudson Hills Press, 2005 pages ix-xi, ISBN 1-55595-233-X
- Chase, Robert, “Preface,” Frederick Hart, The Complete Works, Butler Books, 2007, pages ix-xi, ISBN 1-884532-85-3
