= Giulio Licinio =

Italian painter

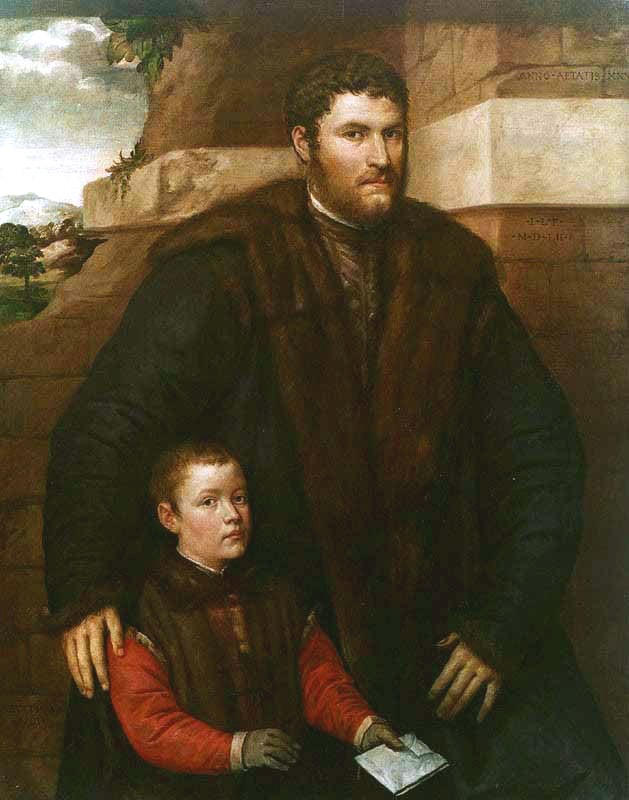
Portrait of a Gentleman and His Son, by Giulio Licinio, 1552

Giulio Licinio (16th century) was an Italian painter of the Renaissance period. He was born in the town of Pordenone and is said to have been a nephew of the painter il Pordenone, and brother of Giovanni Antonio. He painted in Augsburg as late as 1561, and he is thought to have died there.
