= Scalzi, Verona =

Church building in Verona, Italy

Coordinates: 45°26′13″N 10°59′05″E

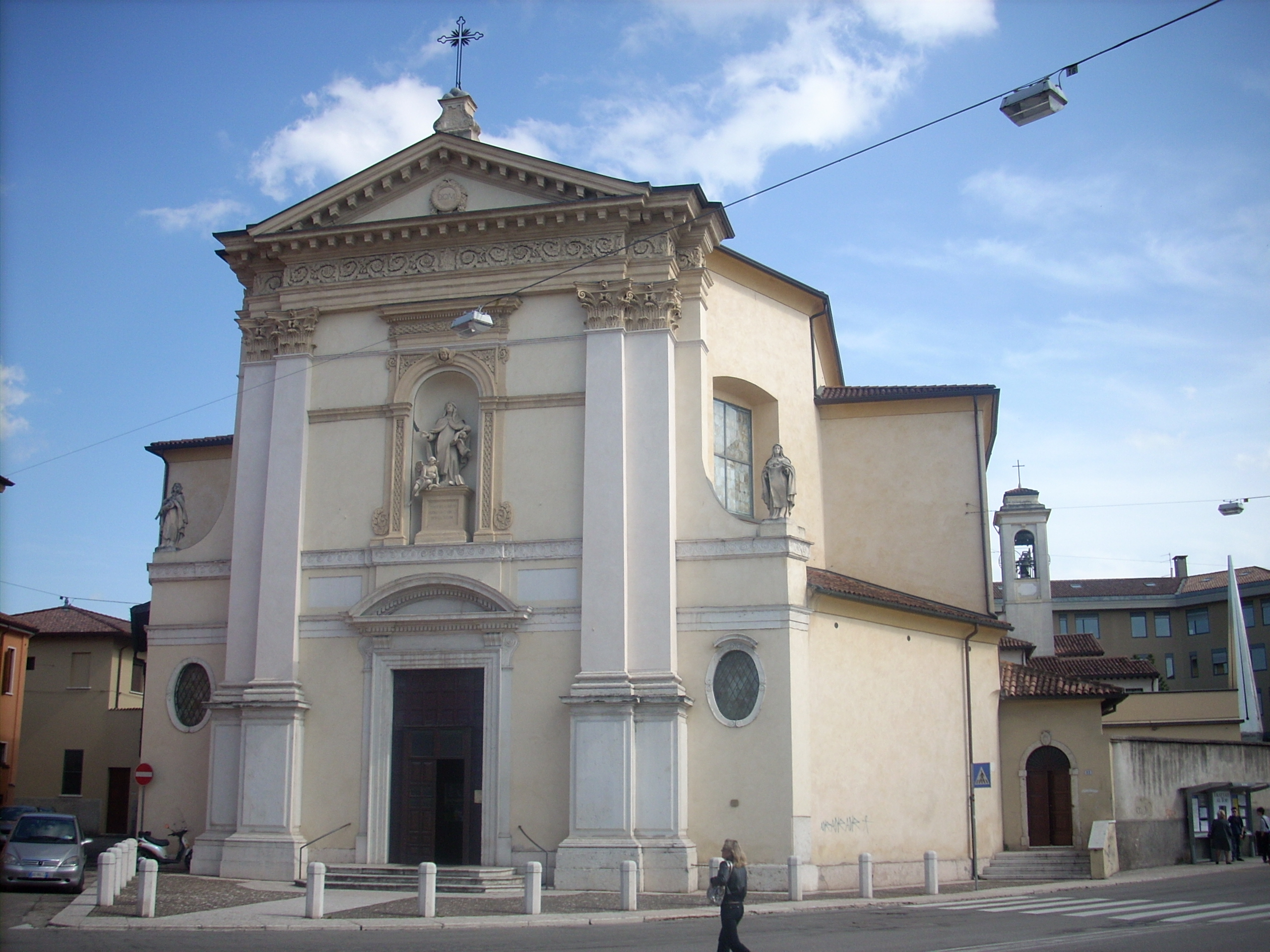
Facade of the church

Santa Teresa degli Scalzi, known as the church of the Scalzi (Chiesa degli Scalzi) is a Baroque style, Roman Catholic church located in central Verona, region of Veneto, Italy.

== History ==
The church was attached to the discalced (scalzi) order of Carmelite nuns housed in a Dominican monastery.

Construction of the church began in 1666 and was not complete until 1750, with the facade only finished much later. The design is attributed to the Jesuit architect Giuseppe Pozzi. Initially dedicated to the Virgin of the Annunciation and Saint Gabriel the Archangel (Vergine Annunziata e a San Gabriele Arcangelo), however the order rededicated it to their patron Teresa of Avila. The monastery was suppressed on 8 July 1806 by a decree of Napoleon and came to be used as a prison from 1883 onwards. The monastic buildings were destroyed by bombing in the Second World War.

The three statues in the facade are by Francesco Zoppi. In the belltower there is a ring of five in A, cast in 1825 and played in Veronese bellringing art. The main altarpiece depicts an Annunciation with God the Father in Glory Above by Antonio Balestra.
