= Madonna and Child (Gentile da Fabriano, Settignano) =

c. 1425 painting by Gentile da Fabriano

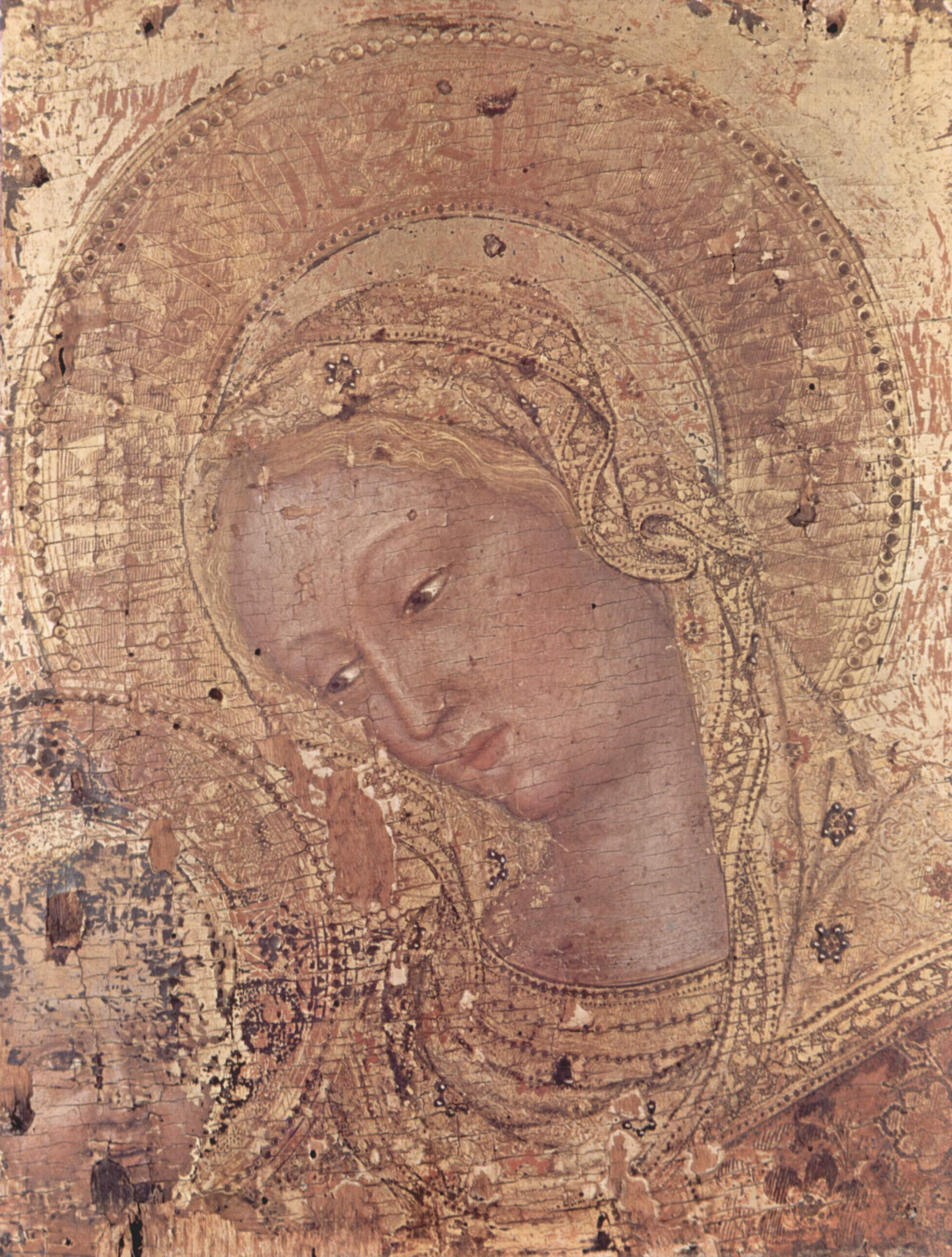
Madonna and Child (c. 1423–1425) by Gentile da Fabriano

Madonna and Child is the only surviving fragment of a larger tempera and gold on panel painting by the Italian artist Gentile da Fabriano, executed c. 1423–1425. It is now in the Berenson collection at Villa I Tatti in Settignano. It is dated to the artist's Florentine period due to stylistic similarities with the Madonnas in his Quaratesi Polyptych and Yale Madonna

It was probably cut from the original work in the 18th or 19th century to save the best-preserved part of an otherwise deteriorated or damaged painting (burn marks are still visible) before selling it on the art market. Berenson found it in an antiques show in Rome and acquired it for his own collection early in the 20th century.
