= Saint Francis Receiving the Stigmata =

Saint Francis reportedly received the stigmata on Mount La Verna, Tuscany in 1224. Saint Francis Receiving the Stigmata may refer to a number of works of art depicting this episode from the life of the saint:

- Saint Francis Receiving the Stigmata (van Eyck), c. 1428–1432
- Saint Francis Receiving the Stigmata (Gentile da Fabriano), c. 1420
- Saint Francis Receiving the Stigmata (Giotto), c. 1295–1300
- Saint Francis Receiving the Stigmata (El Greco, Baltimore), c. 1585
- Saint Francis Receiving the Stigmata (El Greco, Pau), before 1595
- Saint Francis Receiving the Stigmata (Rubens), c. 1615–1630
- Saint Francis Receiving the Stigmata (Titian), c. 1525
