= Intercession Altarpiece =

Altarpiece by Gentile da Fabriano

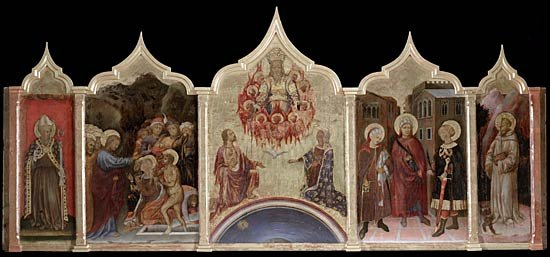
- Artist: Gentile da Fabriano
- Year: 1420–1423
- Medium: tempera and gold on panel
- Dimensions: 222 cm × 97 cm (87 in × 38 in)
- Location: Chiesa di San Niccolò Oltrarno, Florence

The Intercession Altarpiece is a five-panel tempera and gold on panel painting by Gentile da Fabriano, produced during his stay in Florence from 1420 to 1423. Its original location is unknown, though it is now in the sacristy of San Niccolò Oltrarno in Florence. It is named after its central panel of Jesus and the Virgin Mary interceding to God the Father. The two outermost panels show Louis of Toulouse and Bernard of Clairvaux. The two inner side-panels show the Resurrection of Lazarus and a group of three saints (Saints Cosmas, Damian and Julian).

== History ==
The polyptych was made following da Fabriano's travels to Florence in 1420–1423, while working on his Adoration of the Magi. The Intercession Altarpiece, named after the central panel, was made for an unknown commission with an unknown original location.

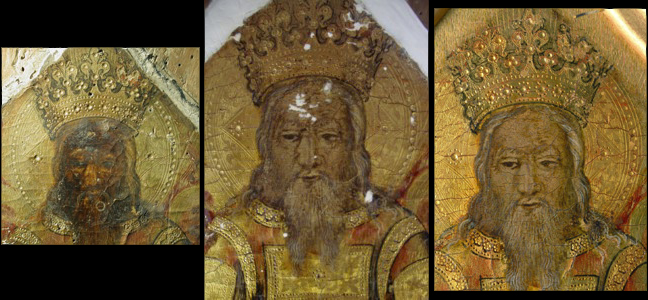
Phases from the altarpiece's conservation

The first mention of the altarpiece places it in the Chiesa di San Niccolò Oltrarno in 1862. Having already been aggressively restored, the work was seriously damaged in 1897 by a fire that burned its whole surface. The following cleaning attempts were not able to successfully recover the work's legibility, causing it to be considered a lost da Fabriano masterpiece. It was held, untouched for years, in the storage of the Palazzo Pitti. The poor state of the panels also raised doubts about the signature of the artist, which was however affirmed by Roberto Longhi and his students. In 1979, art historian Luciano Bellosi denied the Florentine origin of the work. Instead he assigned it to an earlier phase of da Fabriano's career, perhaps in Venice. Bellosi believed that the work was perhaps sent to Florence as a calling card by the painter, as a test of his skill before settling there.

== Bibliography ==
- Il Gentile risorto. Il polittico dell'Intercessione di Gentile da Gabriano (in Italian). Florence: Edifir. 2006.
