= Valle Romita Polyptych =

Polyptych by Gentile da Fabriano

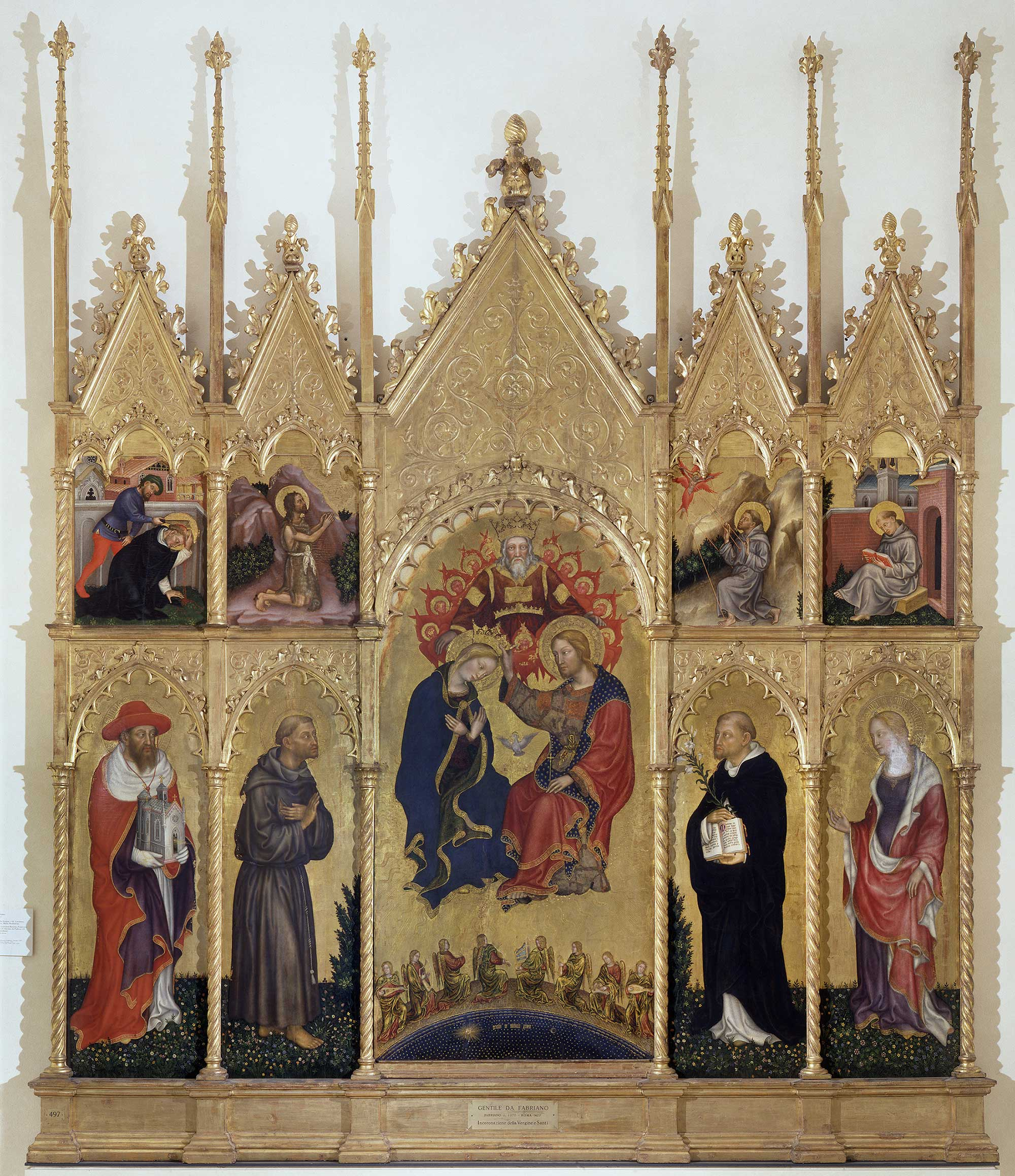
- Artist: Gentile da Fabriano
- Year: c. 1410–1412
- Type: Tempera and gold on panel
- Dimensions: 280 cm × 250 cm (110 in × 98 in)
- Location: Pinacoteca di Brera; Milan

The Valle Romita Polyptych (Italian: Polittico di Valle Romita) is a painting by the Italian late Gothic painter Gentile da Fabriano, dating from c. 1408 and now housed in the Pinacoteca di Brera in Milan. It was originally executed for the Franciscan hermitage of Valle Romita near Gentile's birthplace, Fabriano.

== History ==
There is no information about the Valle Romita Polyptych's origins; however, it may have been commissioned by the lord of Fabriano, Chiavello Chiavelli, when in 1406 he had the local convent restored to house his future tomb. The painting would thus date from 1406 to 1414, when Gentile left the Marche and moved to Brescia under Pandolfo III Malatesta. The presence of elements of the International Gothic style, in particular as practiced by Michelino da Besozzo (such as the accurate rendering of natural details) has led some to narrow the dates to 1410-1412, when the two artists met in Venice.

The polyptych was disassembled as early as the 18th century. In 1811 the Pinacoteca di Brera acquired the central panel and the lower ones from the hermitage, which had been suppressed. The upper panels were bought from a private collection in 1901. The neo-Gothic frame dates to 1925.

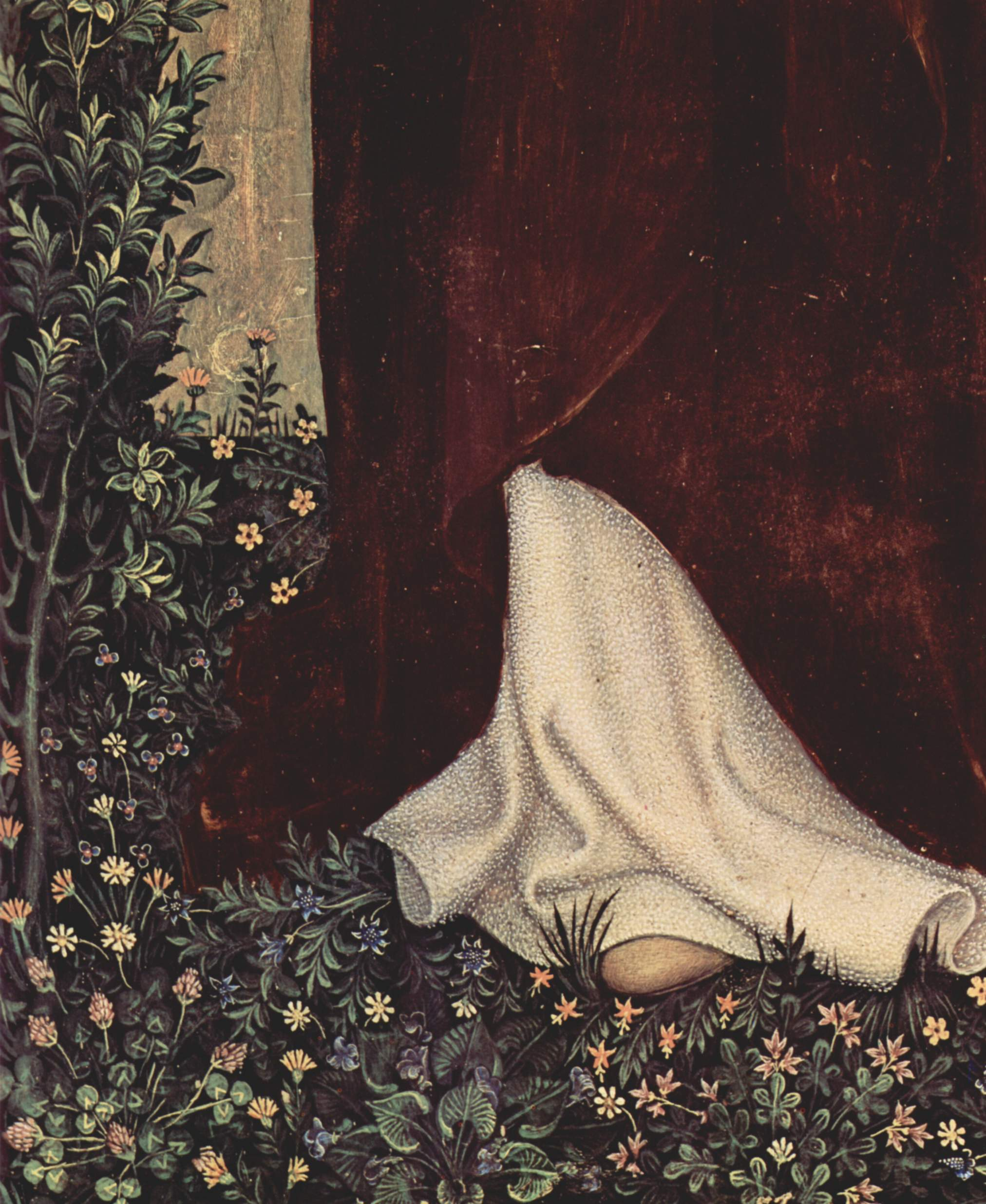
Detail of the lawn.

== Description ==
The polyptych measures 280 x 250 cm, the panels measuring 157.20x79.6 (central one), 117.50x40 (side lower panels) and 48.9x37.8 (upper panels).

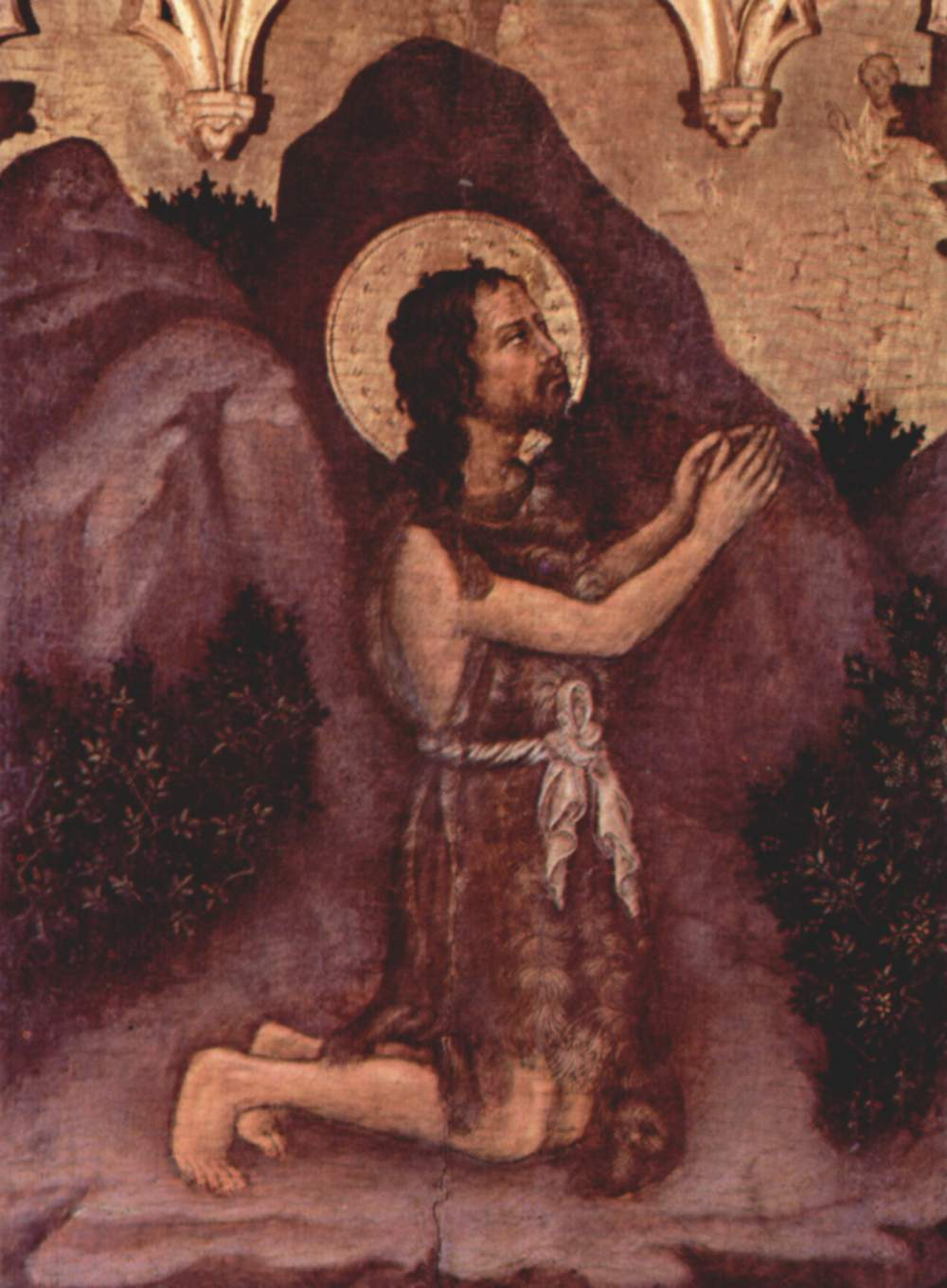
Saint John Praying in the Desert.

The central panel depicts the Incoronation of the Virgin and, in the lower part, a Trinity and a choir of musician angels. This scene was inspired to the Byzantine mosaics that Gentile had seen at Venice in St. Mark's Basilica, as shown by the figures floating in the air and the shining gold background, which is very finely tooled. Jesus' garment is drawn over a silver sheet.

The four side panels show figures of saints: from the left are Saint Jerome, with a model of the church in his hands, Saint Francis of Assisi, Saint Dominic and Mary Magdalene. The figures are located in a garden whose botanic species are painted in deep detail. Details include the ampulla (not painted, but engraved in gold) held by Mary Magdalene in her fingers' tips: later, influenced by Masaccio's realism, Gentile would paint the same subject as firmly hold in Mary's hands in the Quaratesi Polyptych.

The smaller panels in the upper cusps depict Saint John the Baptist Praying in the Desert, the Martyrdom of Saint Peter of Verona, Saint Anthony of Padua Reading and Saint Francis Receiving the Stigmata. The scenes include further examples of Gentile's attention to details, such as the quasi-pointillism technique used to render the wool of the figure in Peter's scene, or the fine hair of Saint John's cloth. It is likely that the central cusp originally housed a panel with the Crucifixion, housed in the Pinacoteca's same room. Other small panels with saints, divided among several collections, have been also thought to be once in the side piers of the polyptych, now lost.

== Sources ==
- De Vecchi, Pierluigi; Elda Cerchiari (1999). I tempi dell'arte. Milan: Bompiani. ISBN 88-451-7212-0.
- Brera, guida alla pinacoteca. Milan: Electa. 2004. ISBN 978-88-370-2835-0.
- Minardi, Mauro (2005). Gentile da Fabriano. Milan: Skira.
