= Madonna and Child (Gentile da Fabriano, Perugia) =

Painting by Gentile da Fabriano from 1408

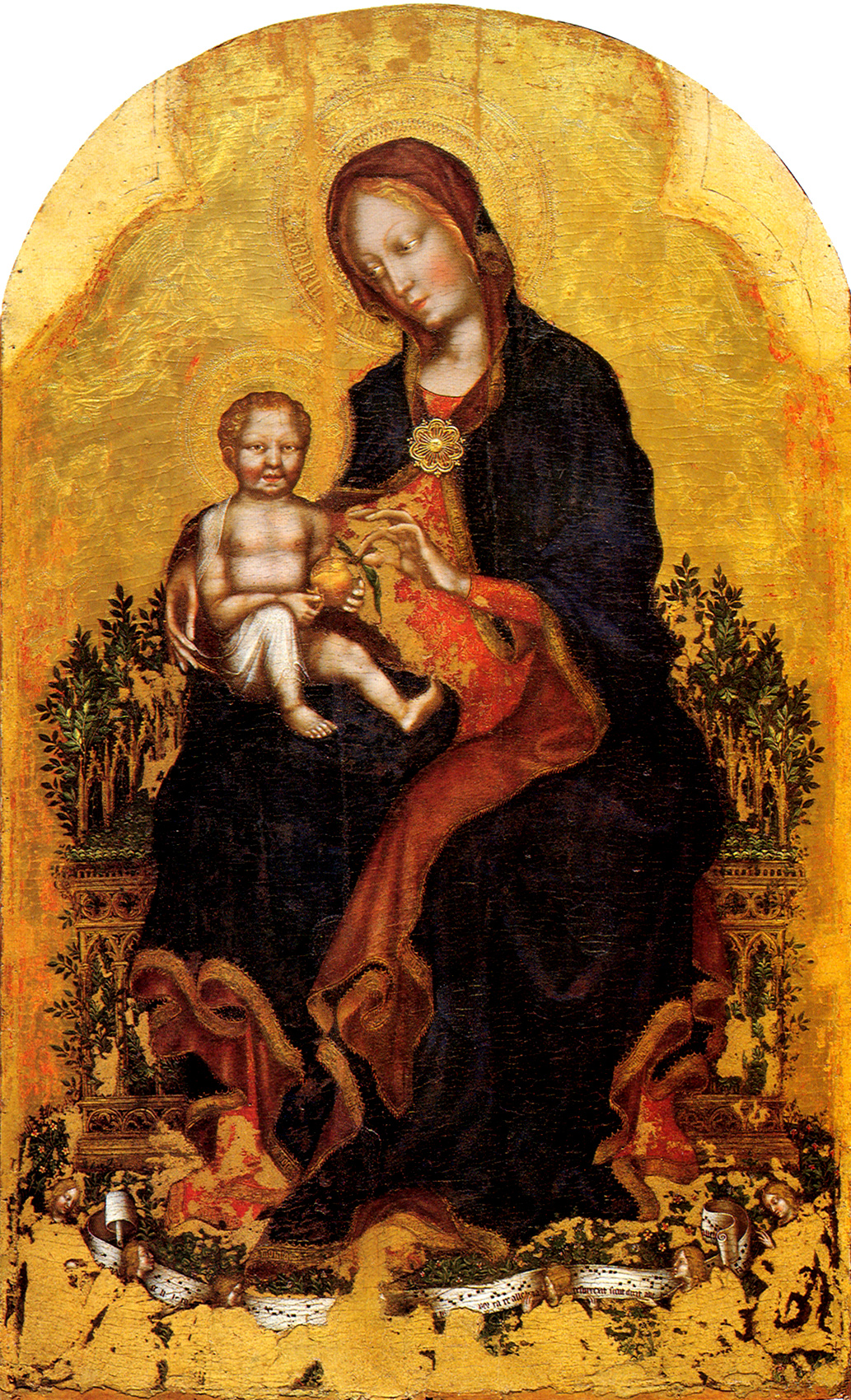
- Artist: Gentile da Fabriano
- Year: c. 1405-1410
- Medium: tempera on panel
- Dimensions: 115 cm × 64 cm (45 in × 25 in)
- Location: Galleria nazionale dell'Umbria, Perugia

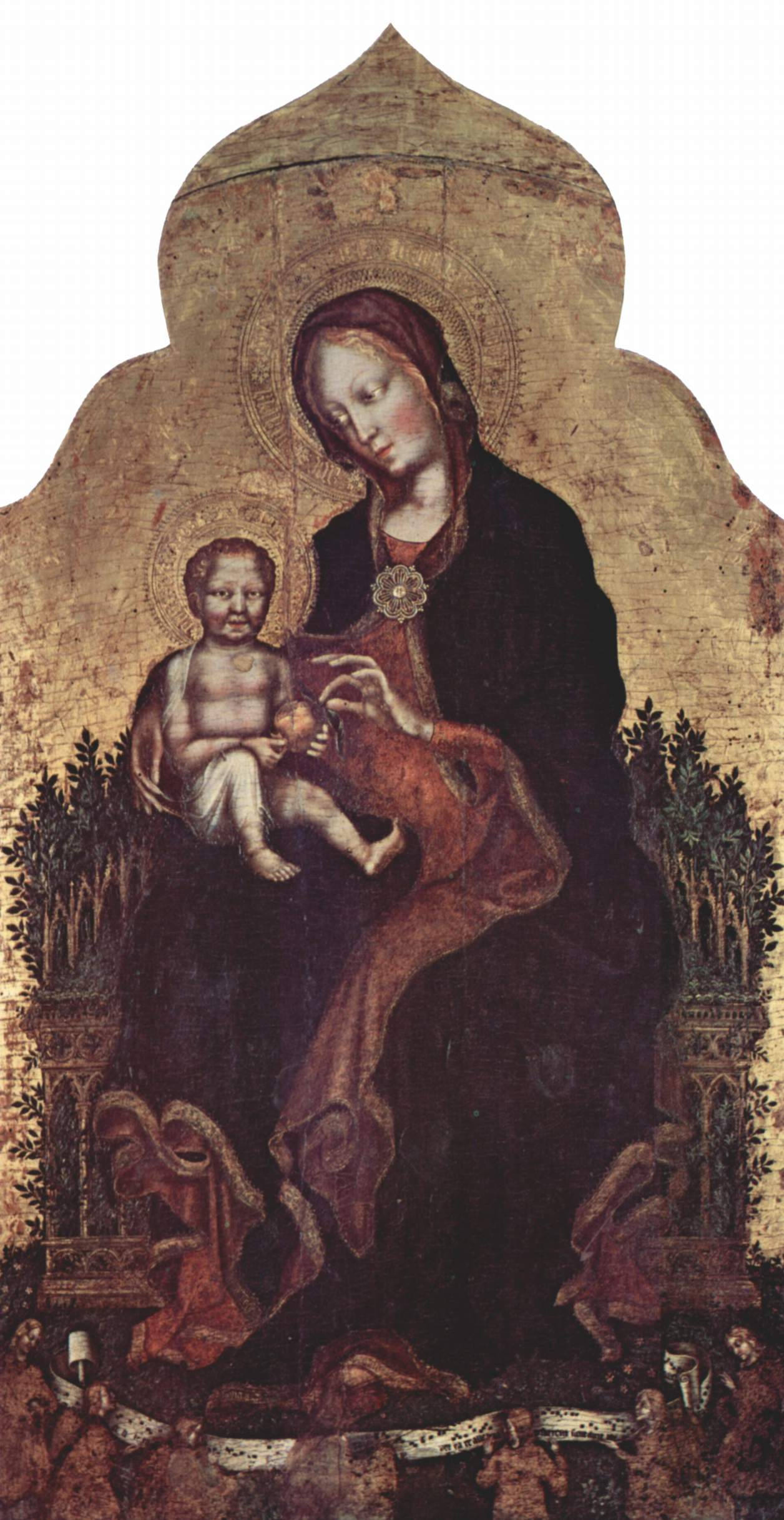
Detail of the painting before restoration

Madonna and Child is a tempera on panel painting of the enthroned Madonna and Child by the Italian late medieval artist Gentile da Fabriano. At its base are small angel musicians. It is now in the Galleria Nazionale dell'Umbria in Perugia.

It was painted for the church of San Domenico in Perugia. It is generally attributed to c.1405–1410, a period when the painter was on the move between Venice, the Marche and Umbria. Some art historians see the treatment of volume in the Christ child as heavily influenced by Masaccio's Virgin and Child with Saint Anne (1424) and so instead date the painting to the final years of Gentile's stay in Florence (1424–1425).
