= Coronation of the Virgin (Gentile da Fabriano) =

c. 1420 painting by Gentile da Fabriano

- Artist: Gentile da Fabriano
- Year: c. 1420
- Medium: Tempera and gold leaf on panel
- Dimensions: 93 cm × 64.1 cm (37 in × 25.2 in)
- Location: Getty Museum, Parma

Coronation of the Virgin is a tempera painting by the Italian late Gothic artist Gentile da Fabriano, executed c. 1420, now in the Getty Museum. It originated as the front of the a processional banner – the reverse showed Saint Francis Receiving the Stigmata and is now in Parma.

== Provenance ==
The painting was commissioned from Gentile da Fabriano, about 1420, as a processional standard banner in holding parades that honored the Virgin Mary for a confraternity based at the church of San Francesco Monastery in Fabriano, the painter's birthplace, he had returned there from Brescia for a few months in spring 1420 before moving on to Florence. It was passed to the Congregation of the Fathers of the Oratory of San Filippo Neri in the same year. Initially the panel was double-sided, but in 1827, the panel was added down at the center to add more two portraits; at the back side was a depiction of the Saint Francis Receiving the Stigmata that is now in the Fondazione Magnani-Rocca. Ambrogio de' Bizochis was probably the intermediary between the painter and the confraternity - he was cousin to Egidio, brother of Gentile's wife.

== Description ==
A ceremony where Christ places a gold crown to the Virgin Mary while she slightly bows her head. The Queen of Heaven is crowned accompanied by the groups of musical angels that stares from either side.

At halo's Christ, where a Christogram inscribed:

YHS / XPS / FIL[IUS]

the scrolls inscribed in Latin:

Timete dominum et date illi hono[rem] / Dignus est agnus qui o[ccisus est]

while the hem of Virgin's robe inscribed:

Ave Maria g[ratia] plen[a] dominus tecum be[nedicta]

Extensive tooling, such as pastiglia and rich pigments applied in a glossy coating above its gold leaf in making a luxurious result on its surface like a tapestry, are Gentile's artwork technique. The creativity of Gentile's art like with the use of intricate materials by using gold as a tool with complex designs is the signature of the artist's artworks which is much appreciated by the well known patron artists of the Italian Peninsula.
