= San Niccolò Oltrarno =

Church building in Florence, Italy

Coordinates: 43.7646°N 11.2612°E

San Niccolò Oltrarno is a Roman Catholic church located on Via San Niccolò in the district of the same name in Florence, region of Tuscany, Italy. The narrow district of Niccolò in Oltrarno is hemmed between the hills around San Miniato and the river.

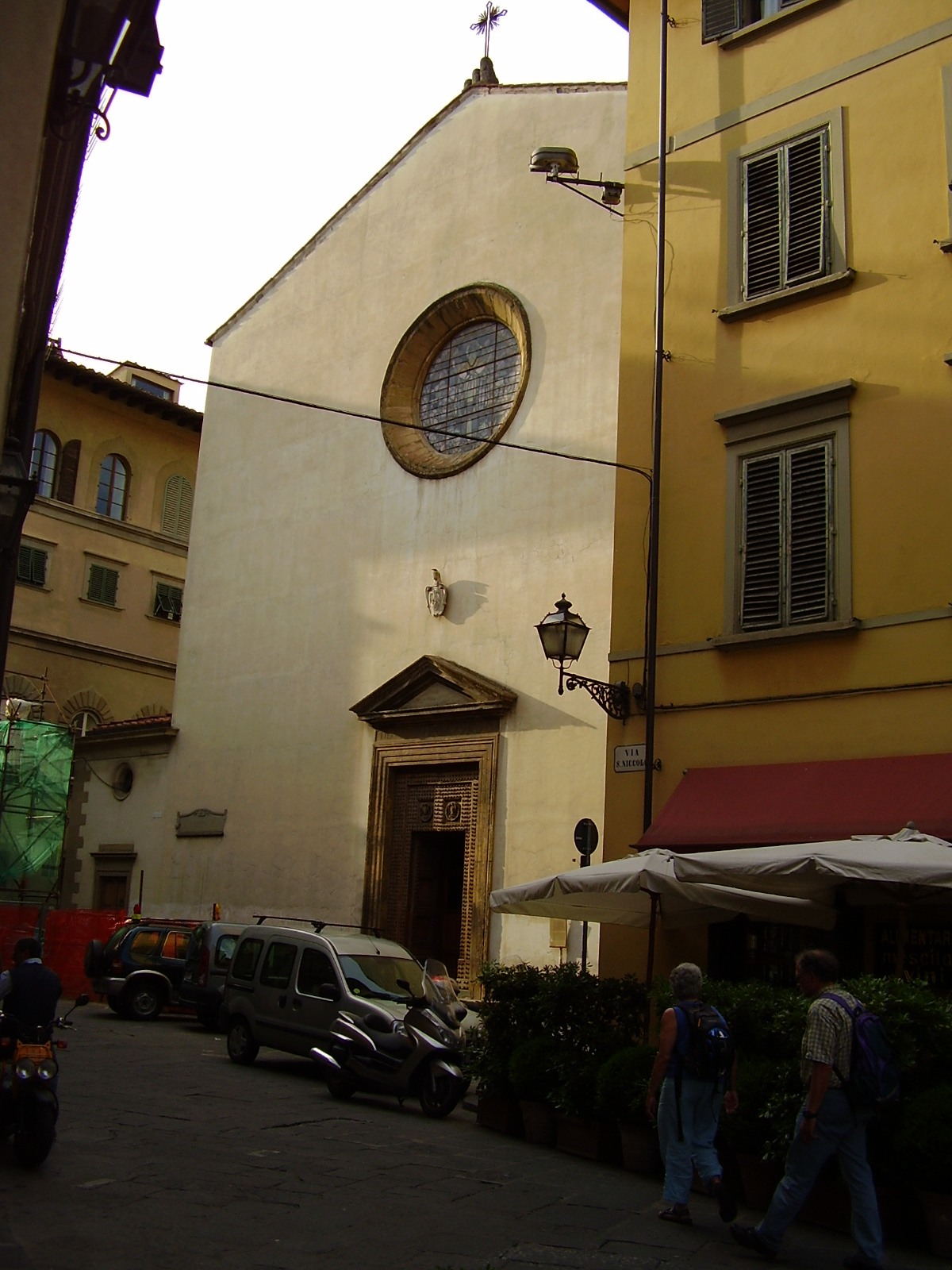
Facade

== History ==
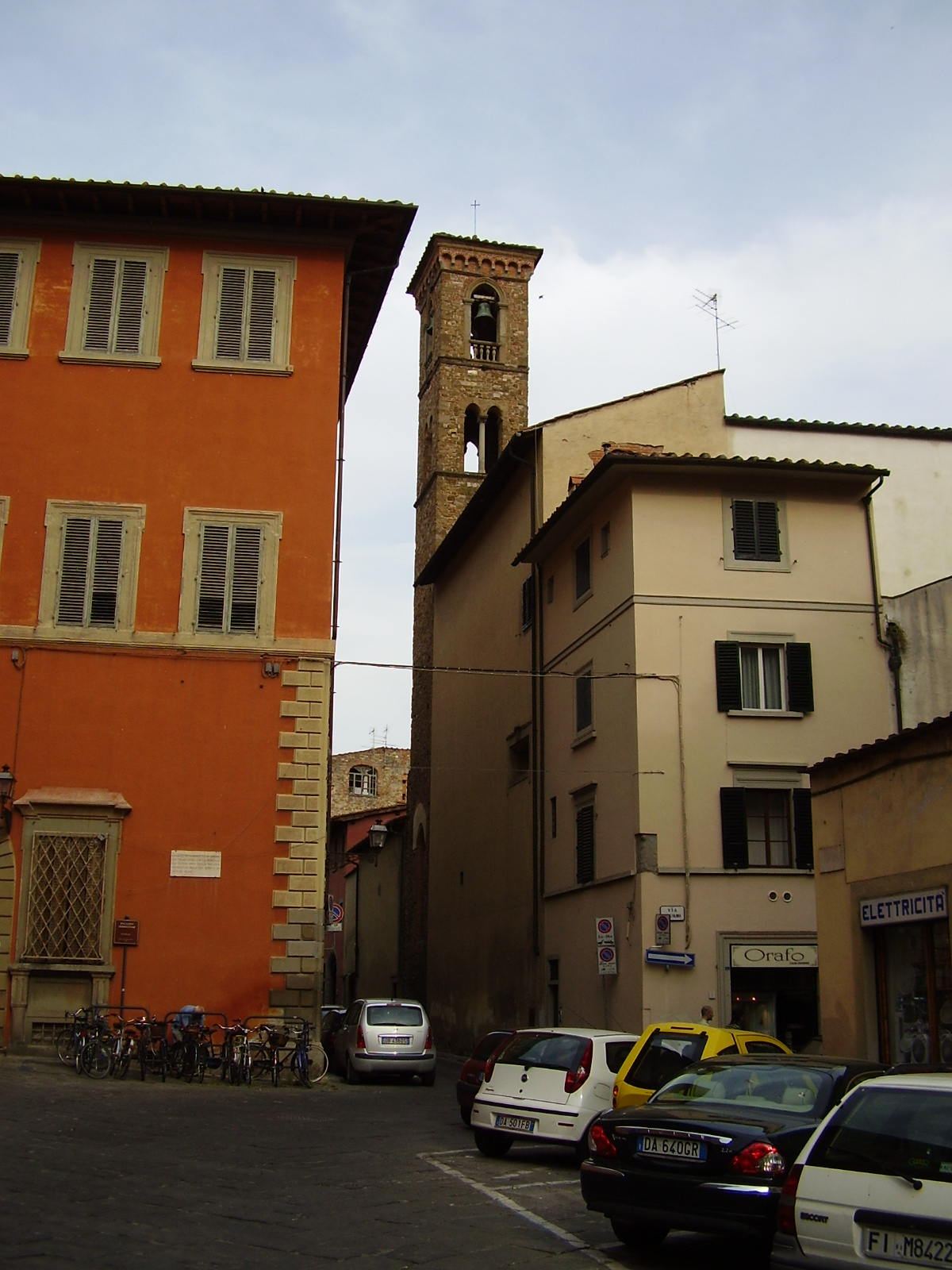
Belltower

A church at the site is ancient, documented from 1184. It became the parish church in 1374. The proximity of the church to the river meant that it was prone to flooding, and was damaged by both the floods of 1557 and 1966. The neighborhood for centuries was home to the lower class workers. In 1828, the Russian count Niccola Demidoff founded the Scuole di San Niccolò Oltrarno for the indigent.

The church was rebuilt after the 1557 flood, and the rose window in the facade was added. The facade and layout are drab. The church has a single nave and three chapels. In the second right altar is a Crucifix attributed to Michelozzo. In the third right altar is a 15th-century St Urban. in the sacristy, is a fresco of the Madonna della Cintola, attributed to Michelozzo.

It also held paintings by Jacopo da Empoli, Sermon of St John the Baptist (1608); and a Trinity and Saints (1463) by Neri di Bicci.

A restored polyptych, the Quaratesi Polyptych, made for la cappella Quaratesi, of Gentile da Fabriano is now again in display in the Sacristy.

The facade of the church has a plaque demonstrating the height of the waters in the flood.
