= Saint Francis Receiving the Stigmata (Gentile da Fabriano) =

c. 1420 painting by Gentile da Fabriano

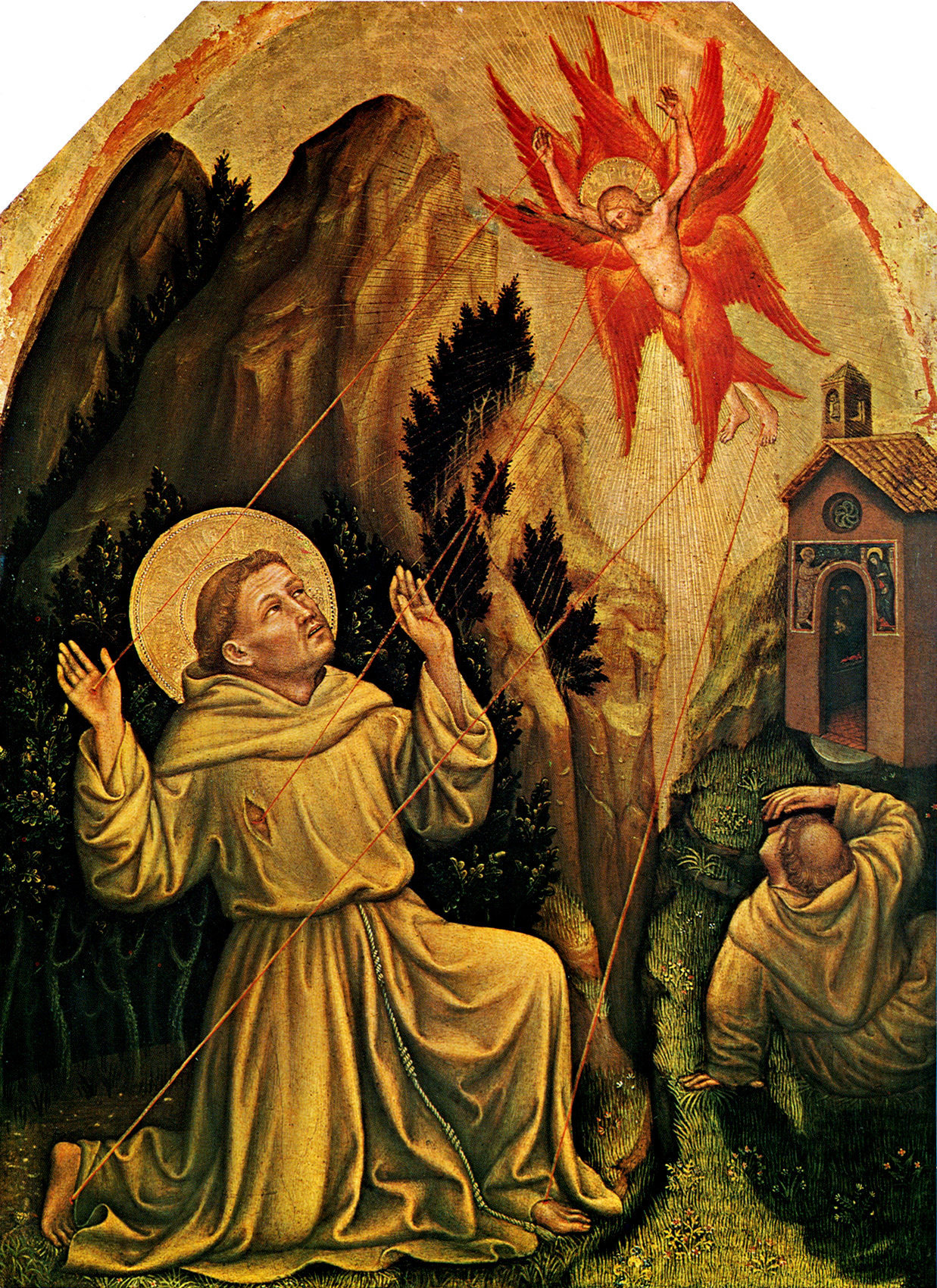
Saint Francis Receiving the Stigmata (c. 1420) by Gentile da Fabriano

Saint Francis Receiving the Stigmata is an oil and tempera painting by Gentile da Fabriano, executed c. 1420, now in the Magnani-Rocca Foundation in the Province of Parma in Italy. It is the back of a processional banner - the front showing the Coronation of the Virgin is now in the Getty Center in Los Angeles.

The banner was painted for a confraternity based at the San Francesco Monastery in Fabriano, the painter's birthplace - he had returned there from Brescia for a few months in spring 1420 before moving on to Florence. Ambrogio de' Bizochis was probably the intermediary between the painter and the confraternity - he was cousin to Egidio, brother of Gentile's wife.
