= Madonna and Child (Gentile da Fabriano, Yale) =

Painting by Gentile da Fabriano

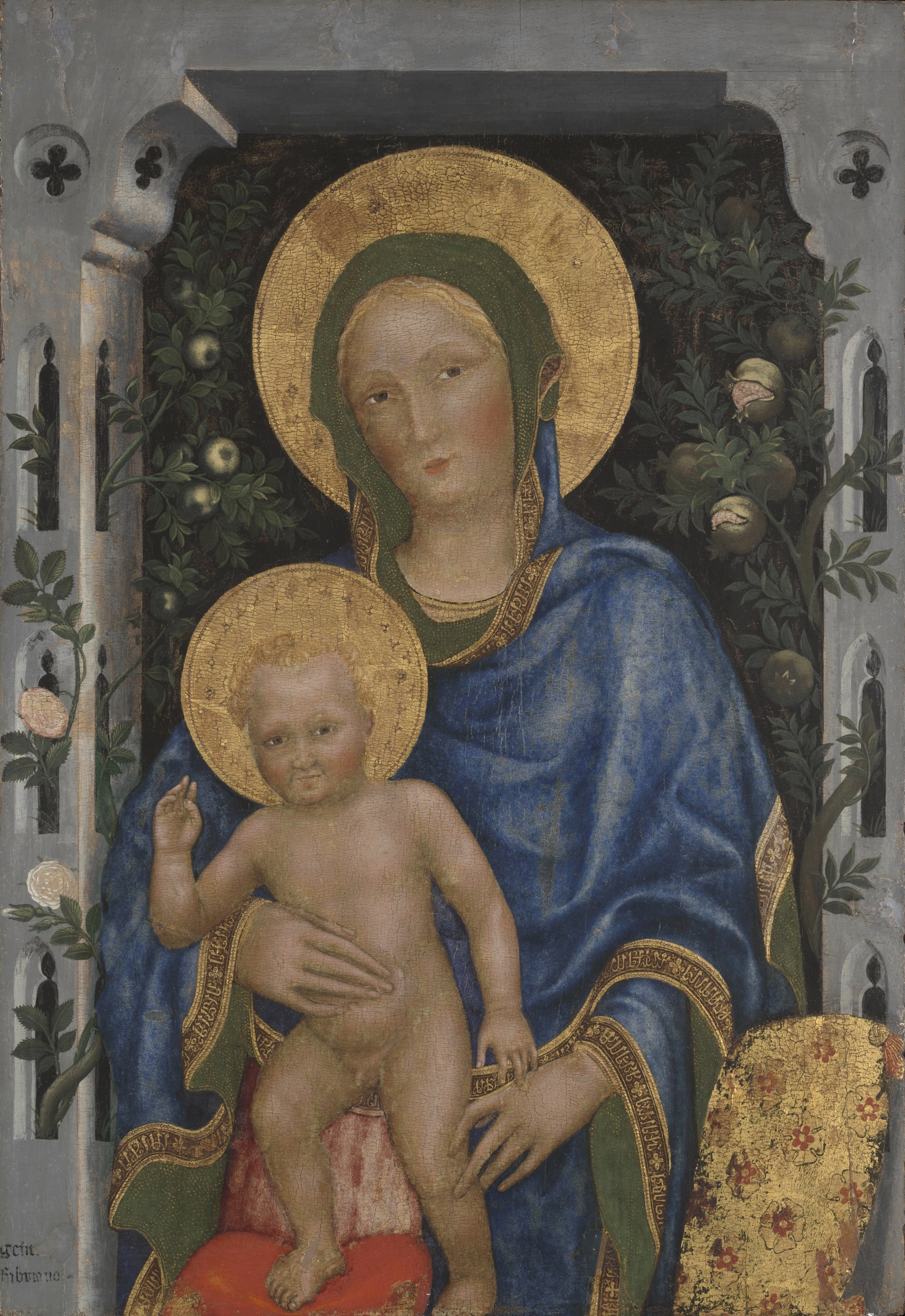
Madonna and Child (c. 1424) by Gentile da Fabriano

Madonna and Child is a tempera and gold on panel painting by Gentile da Fabriano, executed c. 1424, now in the Yale University Art Gallery in New Haven. It is signed on the left jamb "Gent / Fabriano". Previously traditionally dated to 1420–1423, the new accepted dating is based on similarities between the background architecture and the north door of the Florence Baptistery, completed by Lorenzo Ghiberti in 1424.

Its first known owner, James Jackson Jarves, was an American art collector who travelled in Marche, either the work had originated there or he acquired it in Florence. It was in his collection by 1860 and in 1871 it was acquired by its present owner.
