= Saint Francis Receiving the Stigmata (El Greco, Pau) =

Painting by El Greco

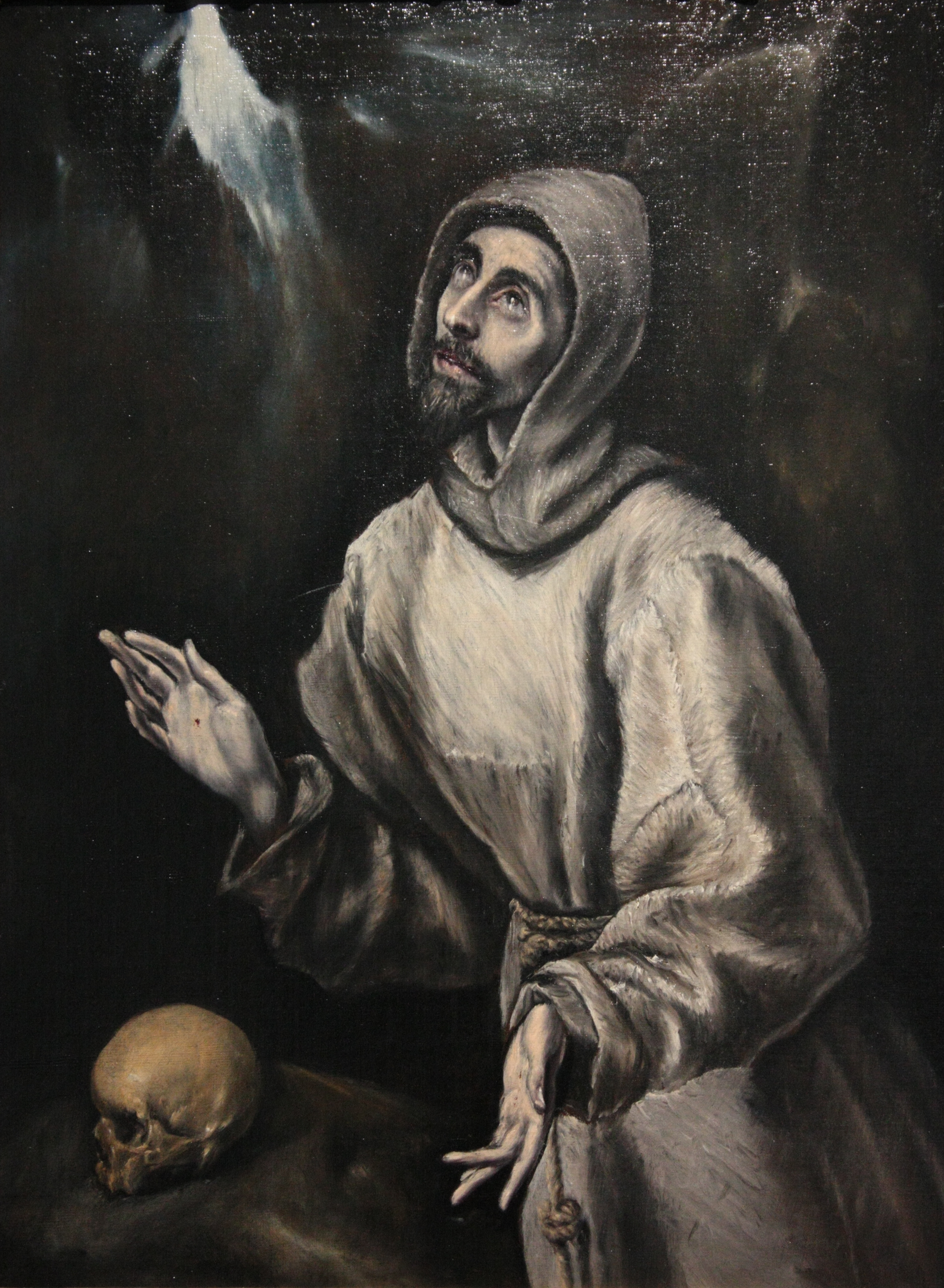

Saint Francis Receiving the Stigmata is an oil on canvas painting by El Greco, produced before 1595 and now in the musée des Beaux-Arts de Pau in France. It shows Francis of Assisi receiving the stigmata.

A number of other versions with a similar composition also survive, such as that in the São Paulo Art Museum in Brazil

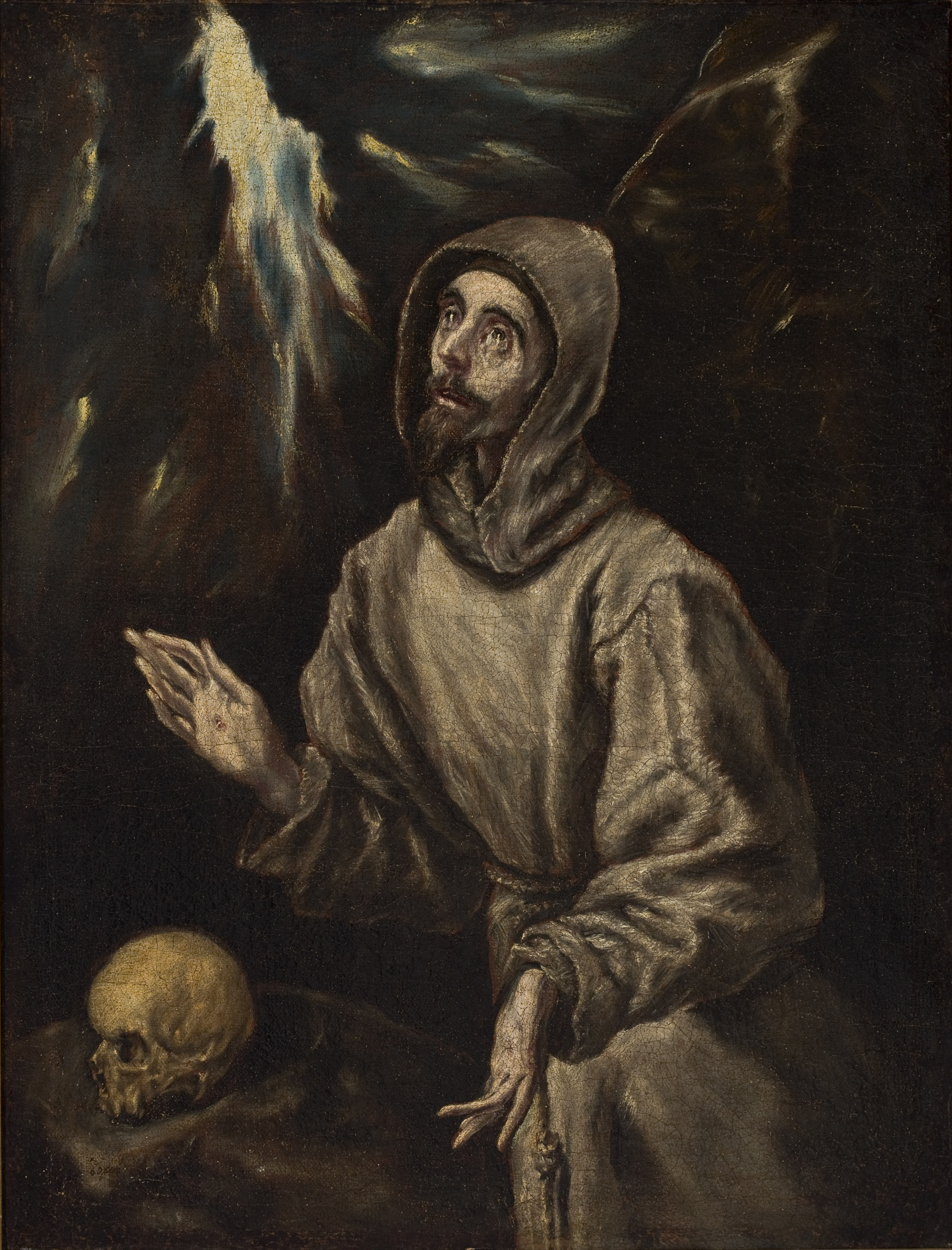
São Paulo

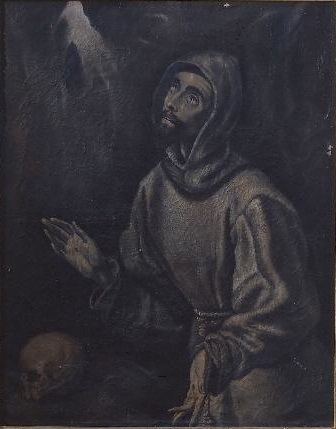
Museum of Santa Cruz, Toledo, Spain

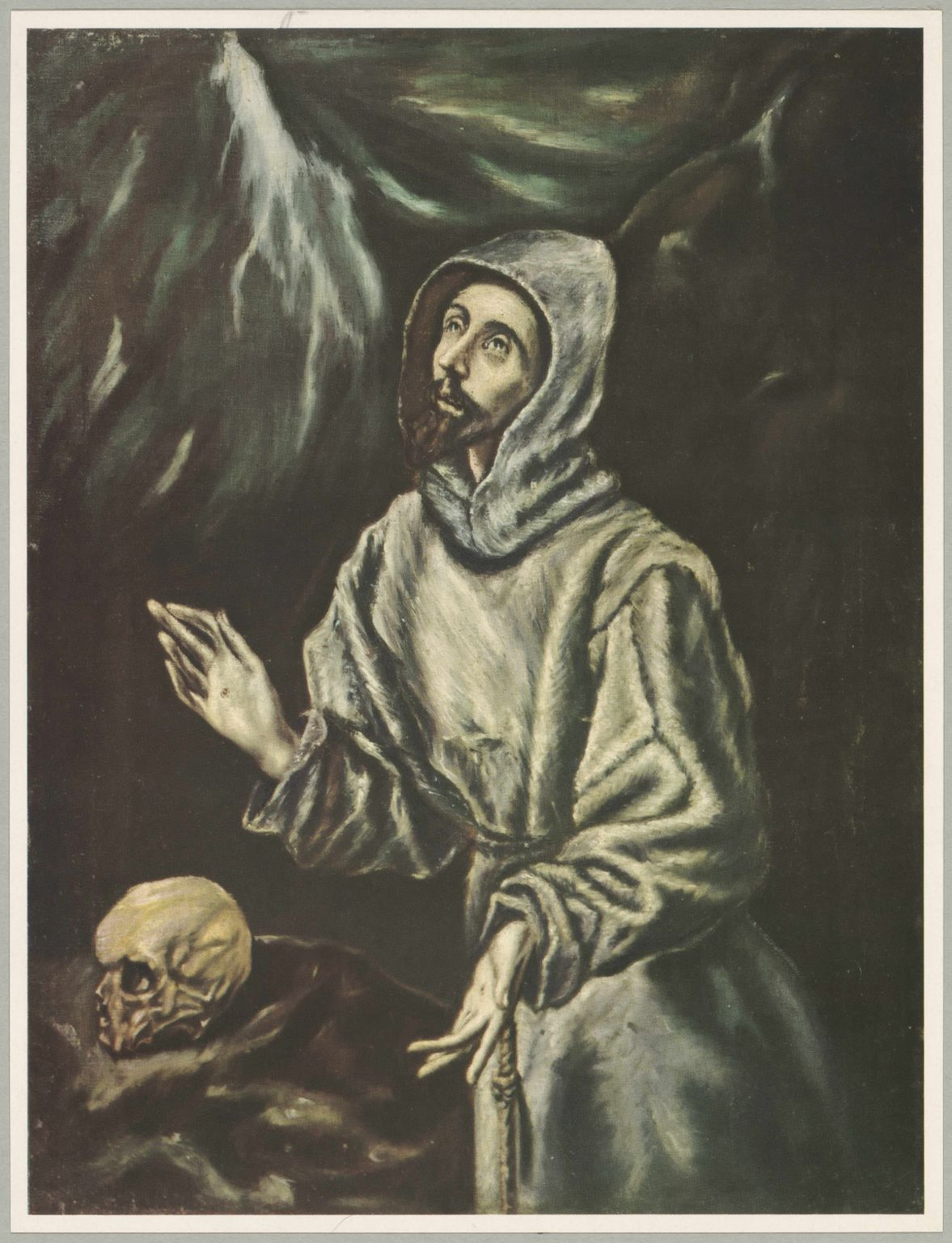
San Carlos Academy, Mexico City
