= Quaratesi Polyptych =

1425 painting by Gentile da Fabriano

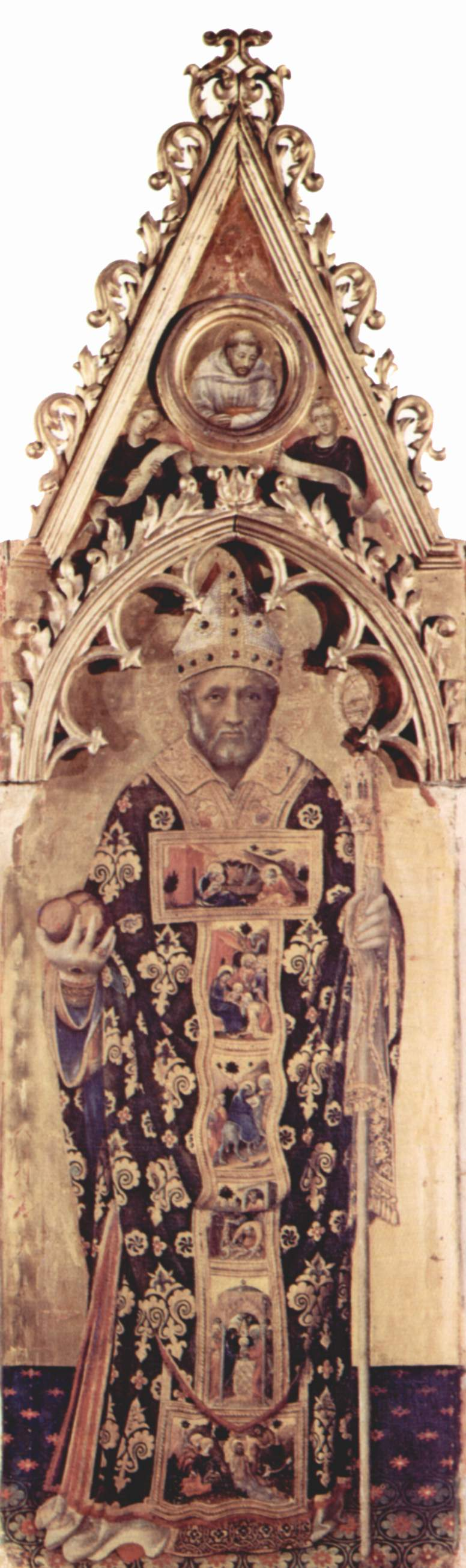
- Artist: Gentile da Fabriano
- Year: 1425
- Medium: Tempera on panel
- Location: National Gallery, London, Uffizi Gallery, Florence, and Pinacoteca Vaticana, Rome

The Quaratesi Polyptych is a painting by the Italian late medieval painter Gentile da Fabriano, now divided between several museums.

It was painted by the artist for the Quaratesi family's chapel in the Church of San Niccolò Oltrarno, perhaps not a long time after the Strozzi Altarpiece. Today four of the five original compartments (including the painted cusp) are known, as well as some parts of the predella (which has scenes of the Life of St. Nicholas):

- Madonna with Child and Angels with, in the cusp, Angels and a medallion of the Redeemer (central compartment), 139.9 x 83 cm, Royal Collection, Hampton Court Palace, stored at the National Gallery, London
- St. Mary Magdalene, with cusp (left compartment), 200 x 60 cm, Uffizi, Florence
- St. Nicholas of Bari, with cusp (left compartment), 200 x 60 cm, Uffizi, Florence
- St. John the Baptist, with cusp (right compartment), 200 x 60 cm, Uffizi, Florence
- St. George, with cusp (right compartment), 200 x 60 cm, Uffizi, Florence
- Predella
  - Birth of St. Nicholas, 36.5 x 36.5 cm, Pinacoteca Vaticana, Rome
  - The Gift of St. Nicholas, 36.5 x 36.5 cm, Pinacoteca Vaticana, Rome
  - St. Nicholas Saving a Ship from the Tempest, 36.5 x 36.5 cm, Pinacoteca Vaticana, Rome
  - St. Nicholas Saves Three Youths from the Brine, 36.5 x 36.5 cm, Pinacoteca Vaticana, Rome
  - Miracle of the Pilgrims at St. Nicholas' Tomb, 36.5 x 36.5 cm, National Gallery of Art, Washington, D.C.

== Reconstruction ==
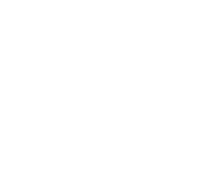

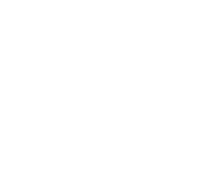

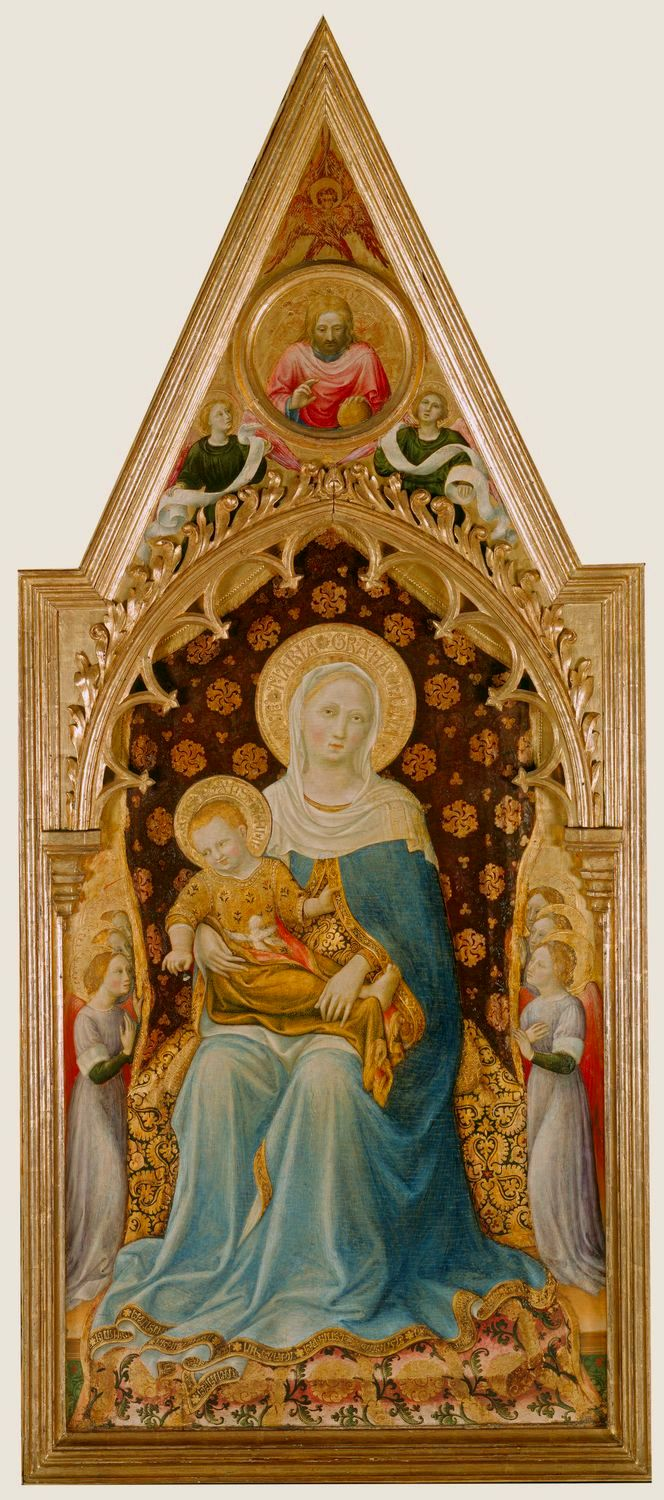

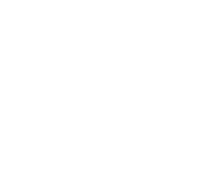

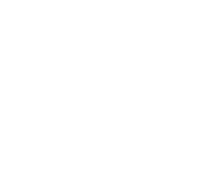

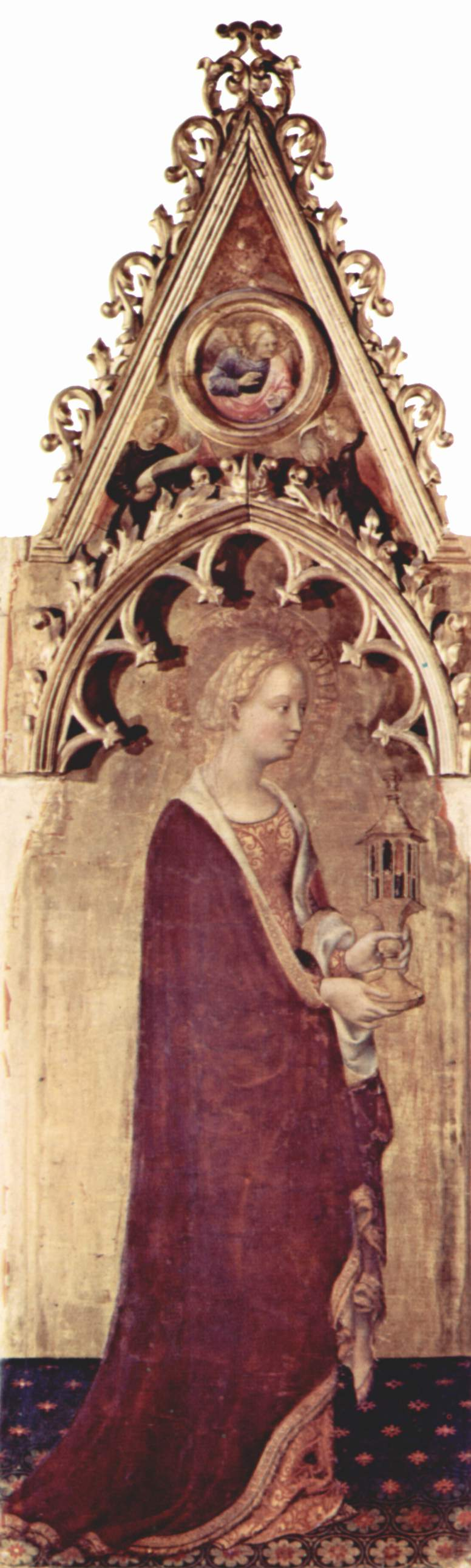

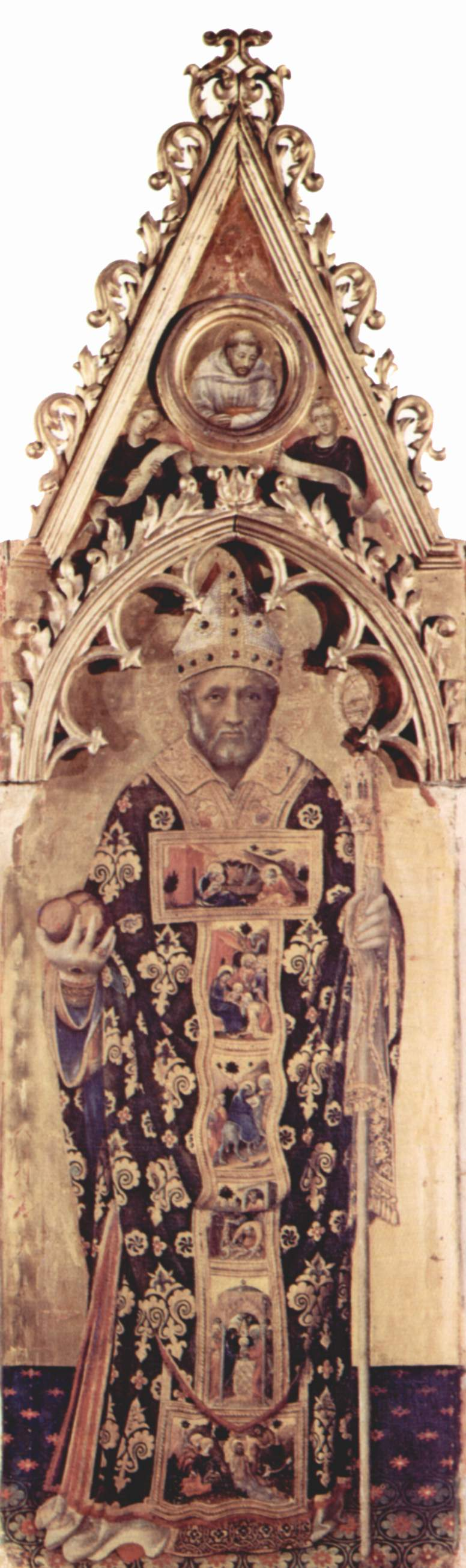

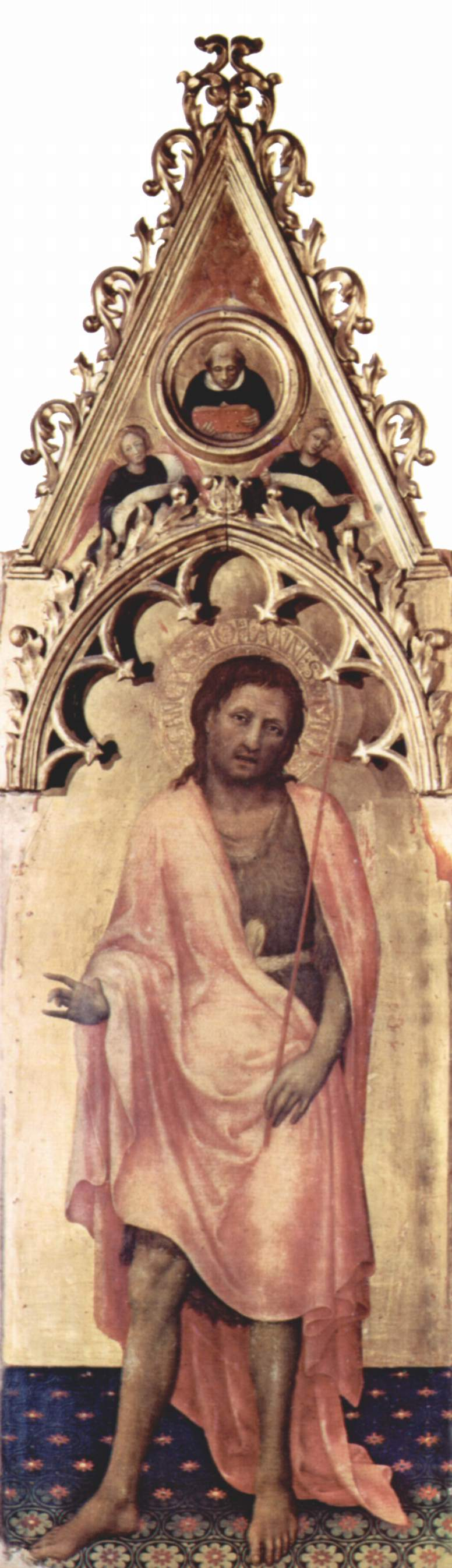

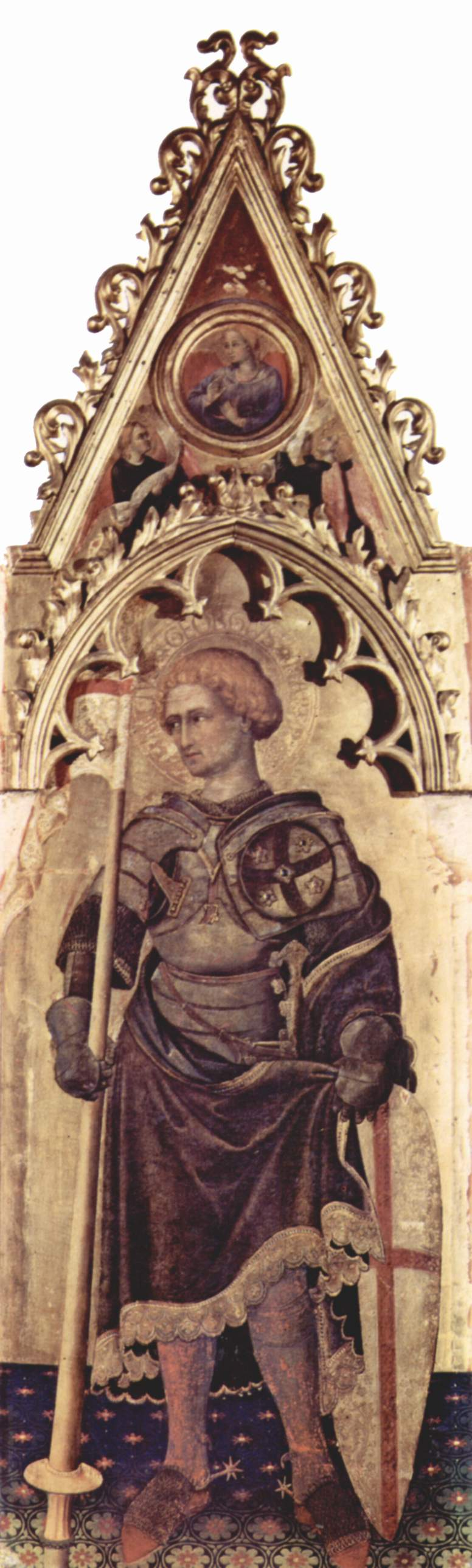

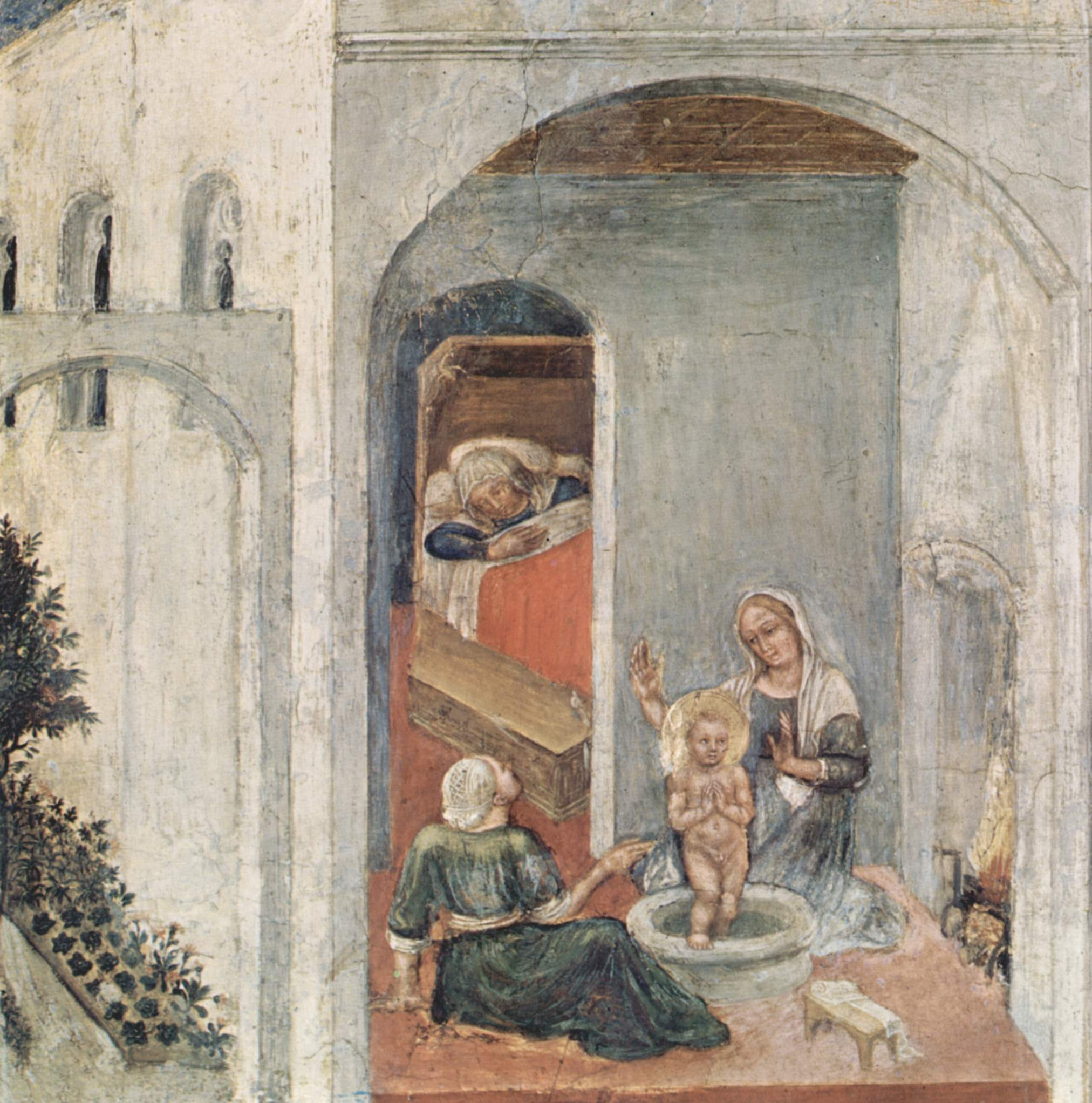

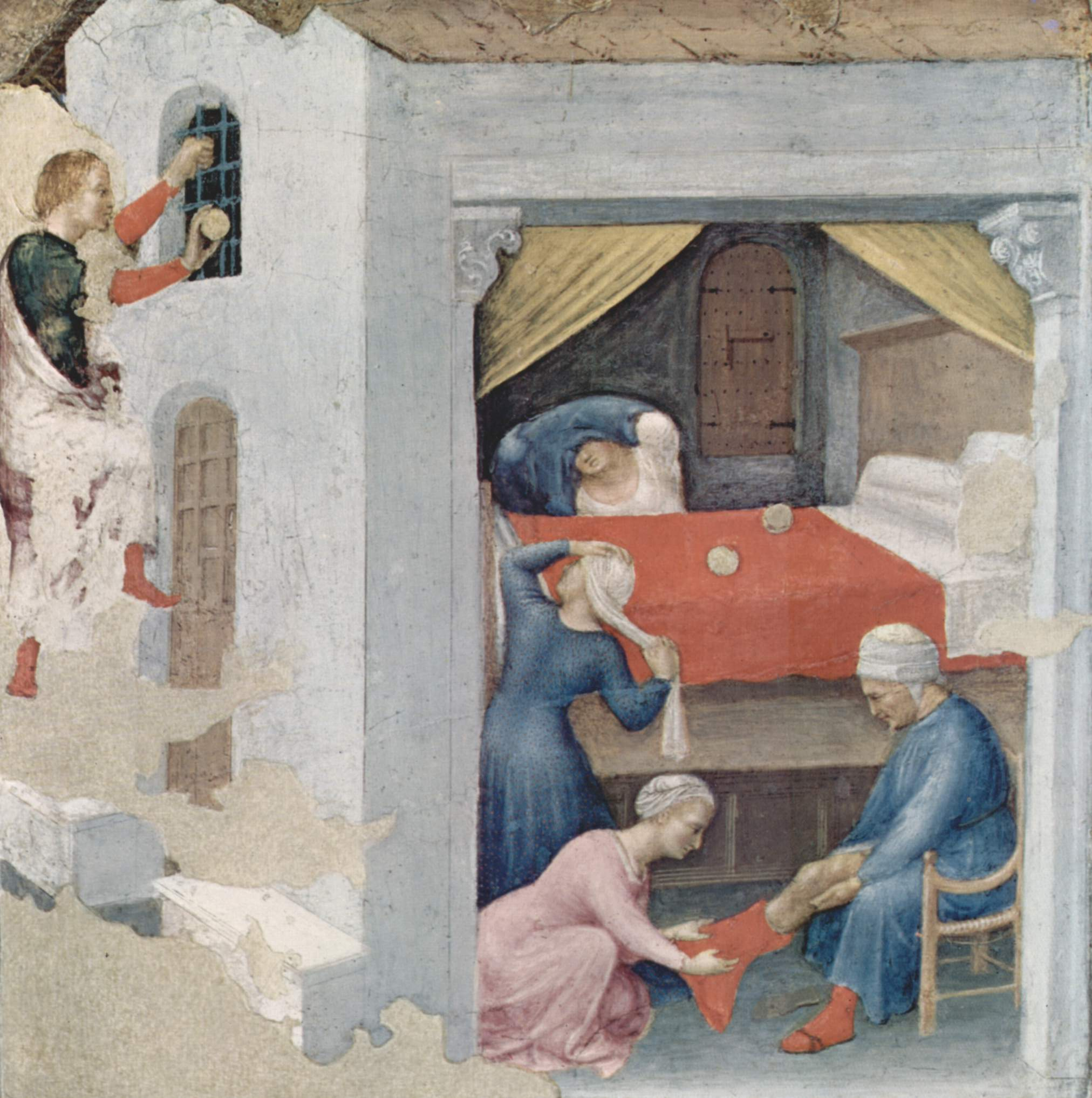

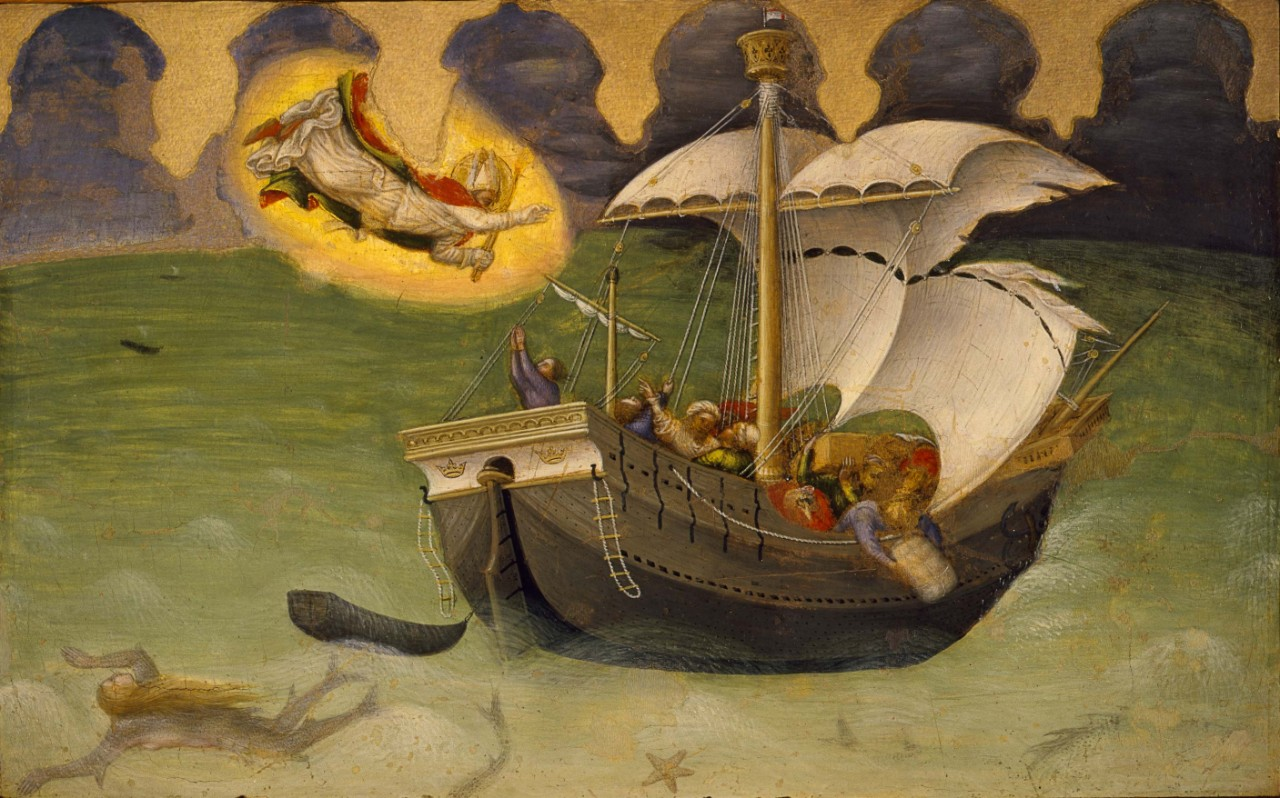

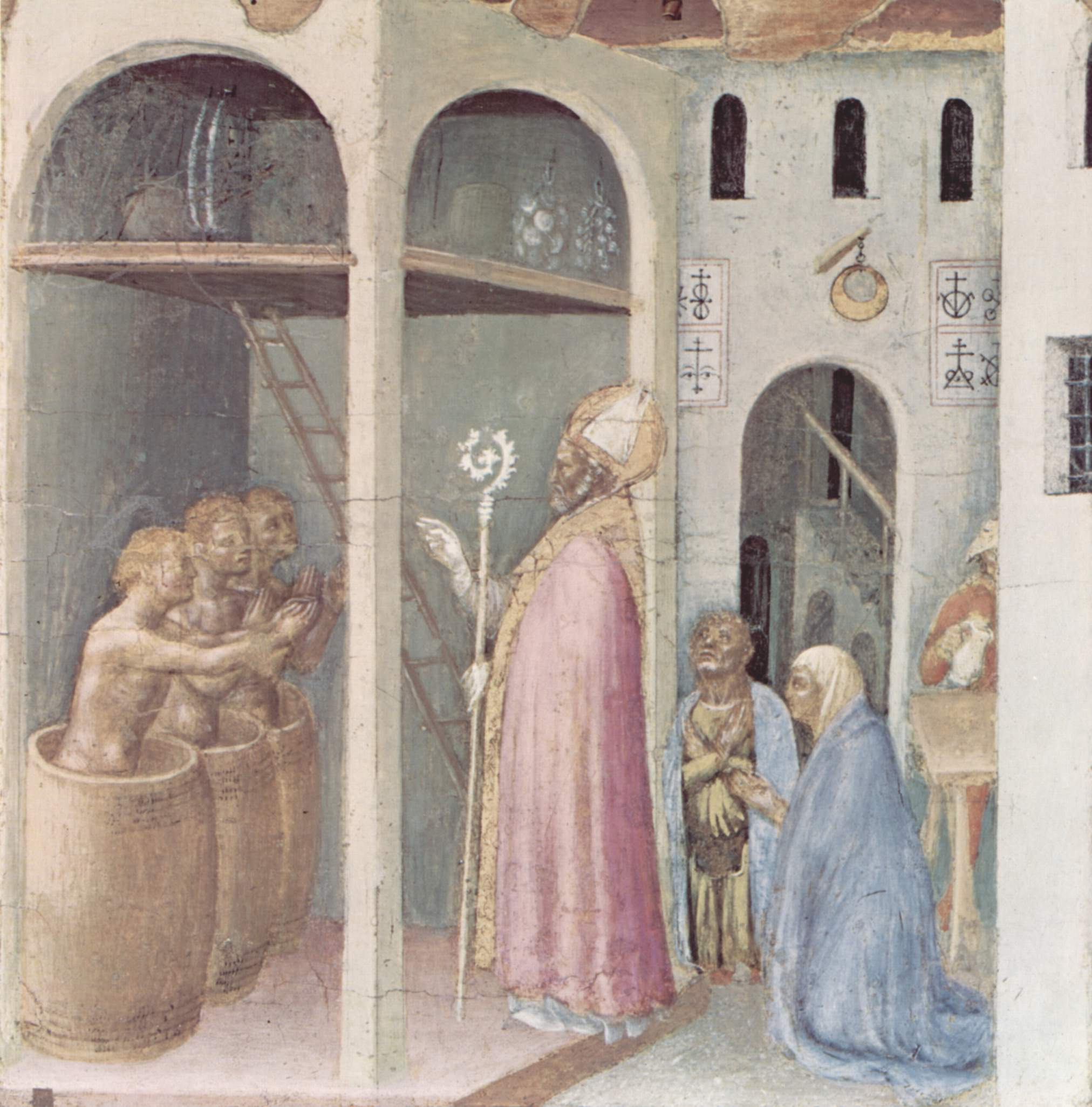

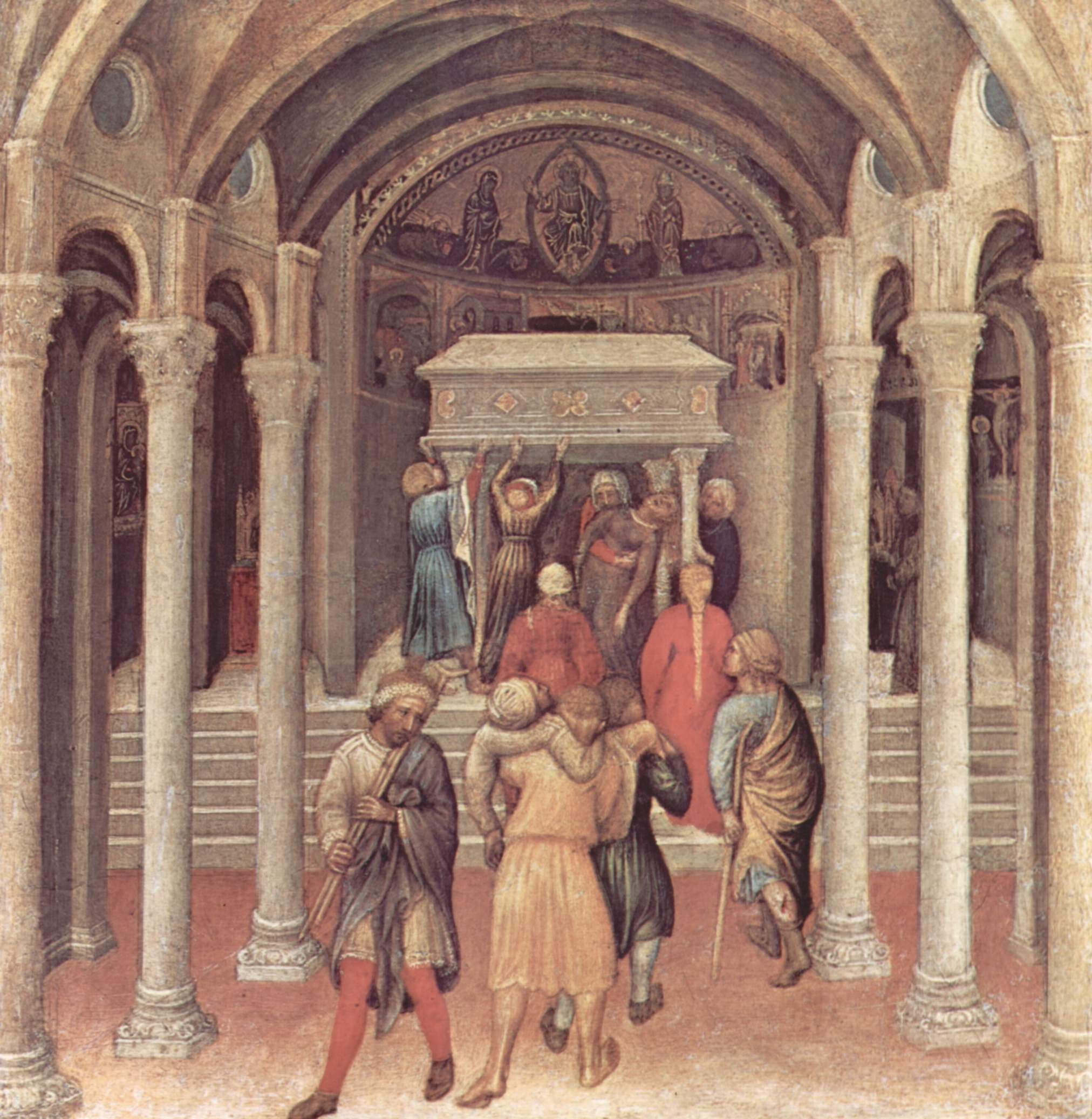

== Sources ==
- Minardi, Mauro (2005). Gentile da Fabriano. Milan: RCS.
