= Gentile da Fabriano =

Italian painter (c. 1370 – 1427)

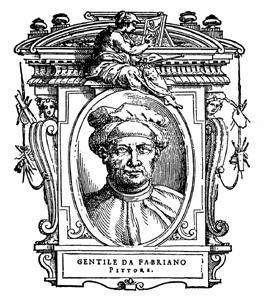
- Gentile da Fabriano, in a portrait from the Lives by Giorgio Vasari
- Born: Gentile di Nicolò di Giovanni c. 1370; Fabriano, Papal States
- Died: 1427 (aged 56–57); Rome, Papal States
- Known for: Painting
- Notable work: Adoration of the Magi
- Movement: International Gothic

Gentile da Fabriano (Note: Pronunciation: UK: /dʒɛnˌtiːleɪ dæ ˌfæbriˈɑːnoʊ/, US: /dʒɛnˌtiːleɪ dɑː ˌfɑːbriˈɑːnoʊ, - də ˌ-, -iːli də ˌ-/, Italian: [dʒenˈtiːle da (f)fabriˈaːno].) (c. 1370 – 1427) was an Italian painter known for his participation in the International Gothic pictorial style. He worked in various places in central Italy, mostly in Tuscany.

His best-known works are his Adoration of the Magi from the Strozzi Altarpiece (1423), and the Flight into Egypt. Following a visit to Florence in 1419, he came in contact with humanism, which influenced his work throughout the rest of his career. He became highly influential on other painters in Florence, especially with his detailed representations inspired by his observations of the natural world.

== Biography ==
=== Early life in Fabriano (c. 1370-1400) ===
Gentile (di Niccolò di Massio) da Fabriano was born around 1370 in or near Fabriano, in the Marche. His family included people active in the civic and religious life of the city. However, much of Gentile's early life remains undocumented. His mother died before 1380, and in that year, his father, Niccolò di Giovanni Massi, retired to a monastery where he died in 1385. Little is known of his education: one of his first known works, a Madonna and Child (c. 1395–1400, now in Berlin) shows the influence of paintings made in the northern Italian late-Gothic style.

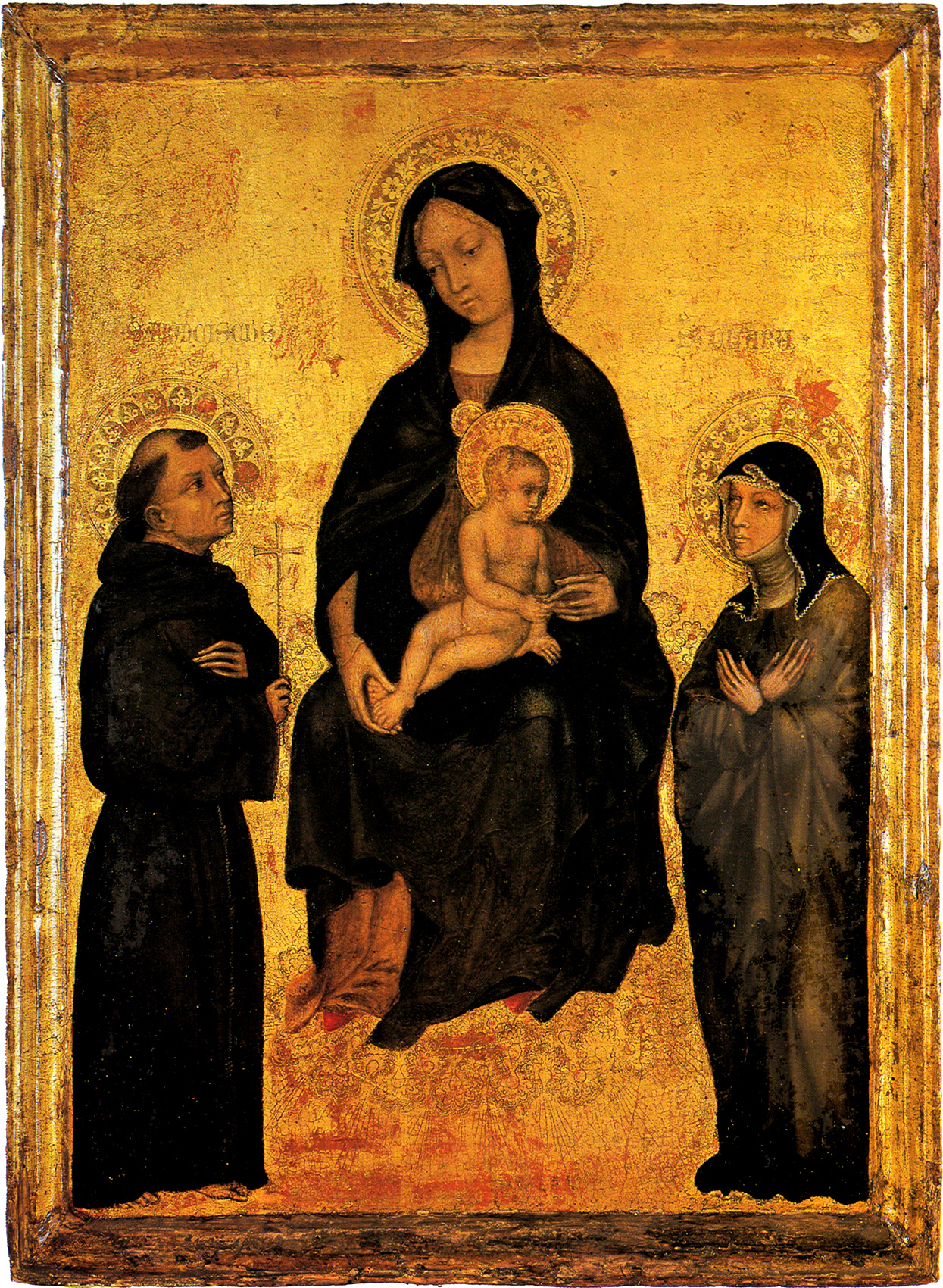
Madonna in Glory between Saint Francis and Saint Clare, c. 1390-1395

Around 1390 he was in Pavia at the court of Gian Galeazzo Visconti, where he left a painting of Madonna with the Children together with the saints Clara and Francis (now in the Pavia Civic Museums) and some frescoes depicting ladies in a room of the Visconti Castle.

=== Venice (c. 1405–1420) ===
About 1405, Gentile da Fabriano was working in Venice. He painted a panel for the church of Santa Sofia, now lost; Jacopo Bellini might have worked in his workshop. Between 1408 and 1409, he painted a fresco (now lost) in the Doge's Palace depicting the naval battle between the Venetians and Otto III. In Venice, he met Pisanello and perhaps Michelino da Besozzo. He also produced commissioned works for other cities during this period, such as his Madonna and Child (c. 1405–1410) for a church in Perugia.

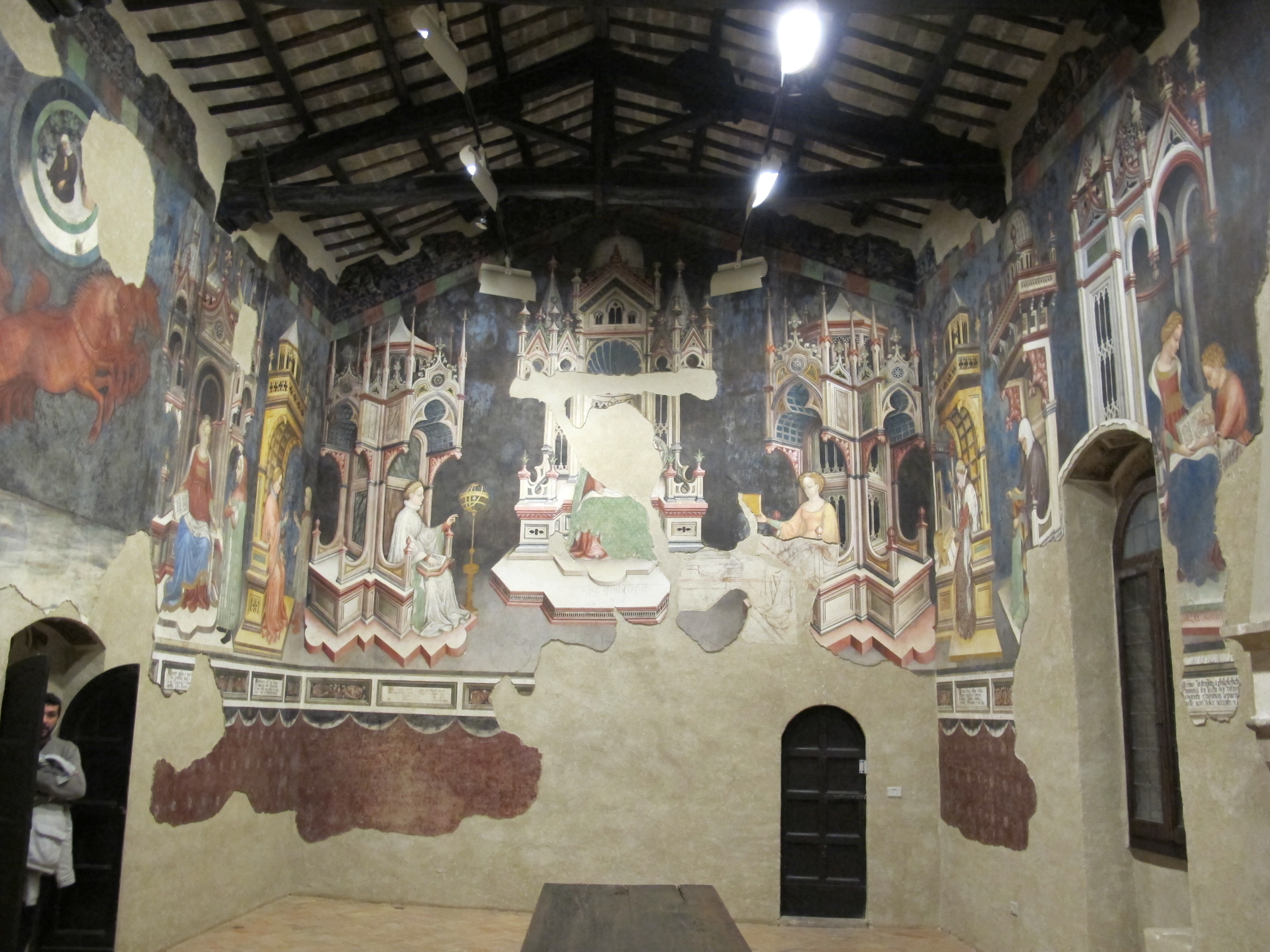
Trinci Palace, Foligno: Hall of Liberal Arts and Planets, 1410–1411

In 1410–1411, Gentile was in Foligno, where he frescoed some of the walls of Palazzo Trinci. Gentile met the painter Michelino da Besozzo in Venice and became inspired by his sophisticated style. Around 1410–1412, he painted what came to be known as one of his first masterworks, the Valle Romita Polyptych (now at the Pinacoteca di Brera). The altarpiece was probably commissioned by Chiavello Chiavelli in 1412. In 1414, he moved to Brescia, at the service of Pandolfo III Malatesta. During the following five years, he painted the Broletto Chapel, a work now mostly lost. While in Brescia in 1418, Gentile painted another panel that was later given as a gift to Pope Martin V, who had passed through the city on his way to Rome.

=== Florence (c. 1420–1427) ===
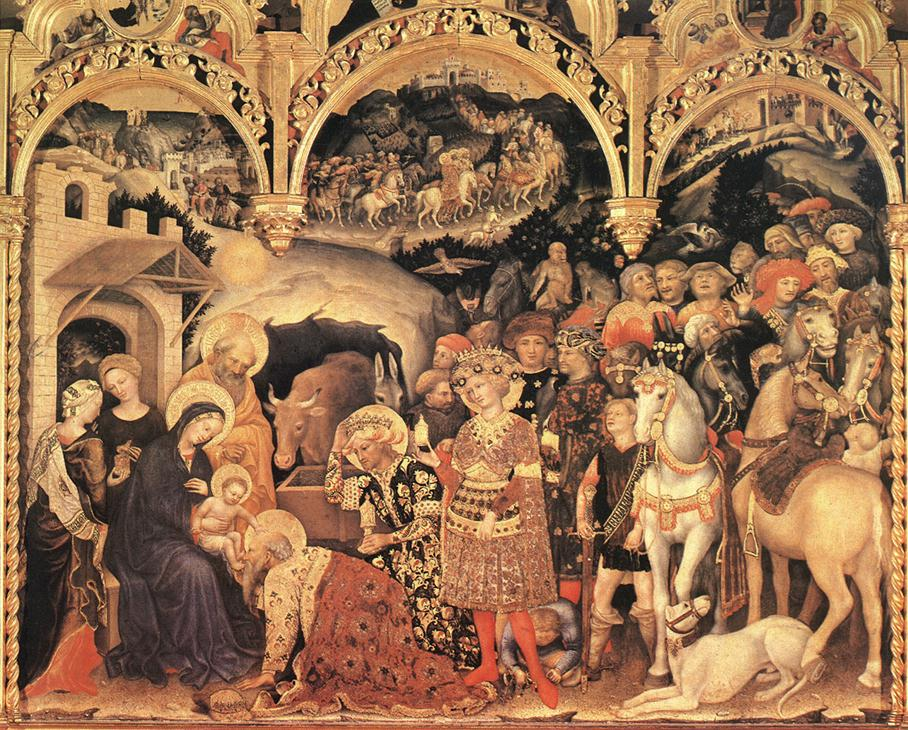
Adoration of the Magi (1423)

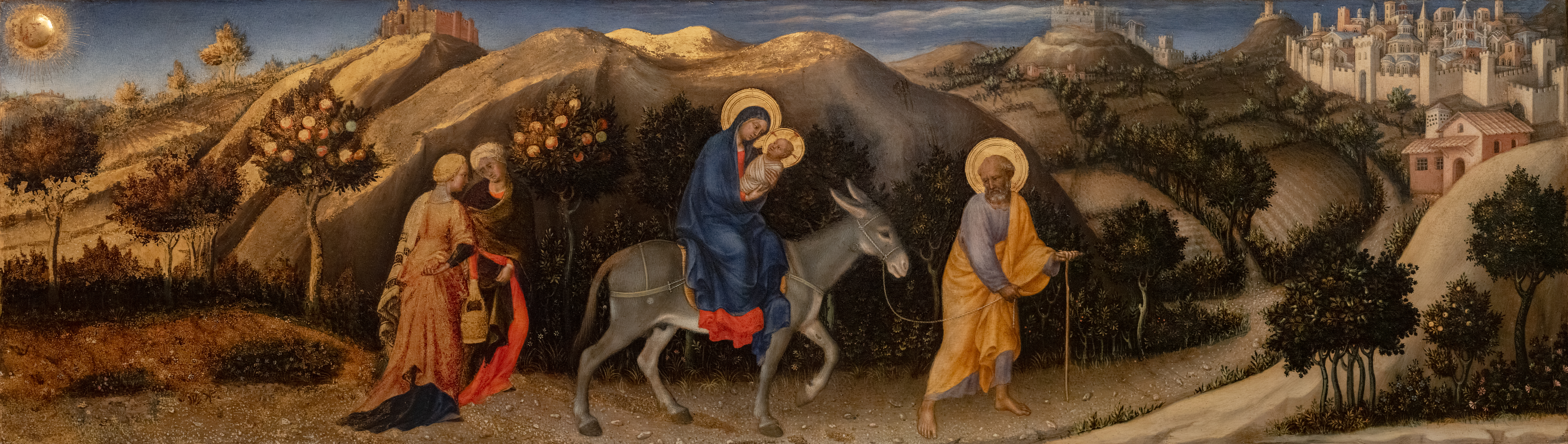
Flight into Egypt, from the predella of Adoration of the Magi

On 6 August 1420, Gentile was in Florence, where he painted his famous altarpiece depicting the Adoration of the Magi (1423) commissioned by Palla Strozzi. This work, which is now in the Uffizi, is regarded as one of the masterpieces of the International Gothic style and had a lasting influence on Italian Renaissance painting. This work demonstrated his improved naturalistic technique with the use of light to create dimensions and perspective. His use of contrasting light brought the figures to life, making them appear more naturally human. His other works in Florence include the Intercession Altarpiece (1420–1423) and the Quaratesi Polyptych (May 1425). In June–August 1425, he was in Siena, where he painted a Madonna with Child, now lost, for the Palazzo dei Notai in Piazza del Campo. Between August and October 1425, he was in Orvieto, where he painted a fresco of the Madonna and Child in the Cathedral, where it still remains today. The work has since been restored.

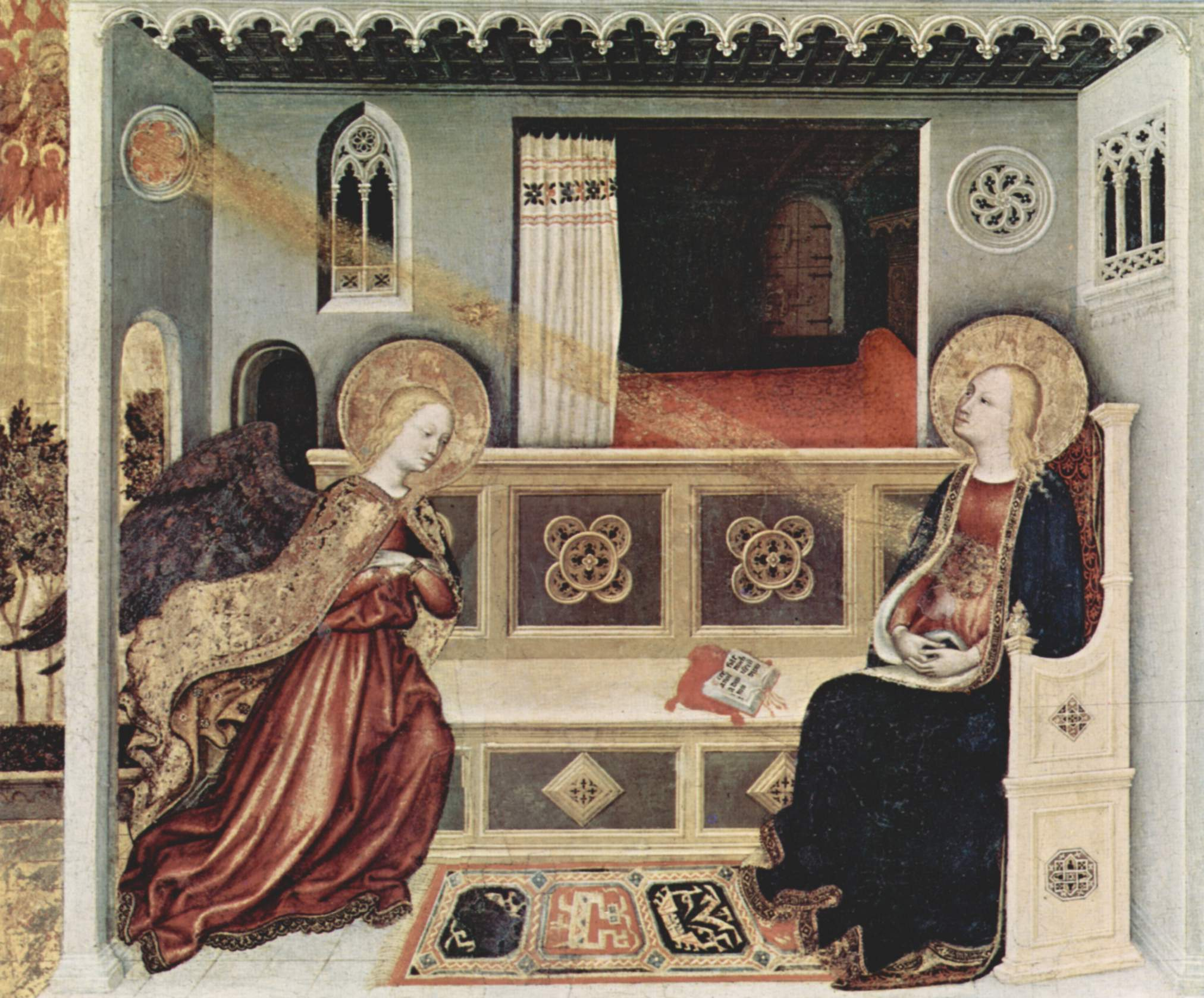
The Annunciation, 1420–1425

Between 1420 and 1425, Gentile painted another work, an Annunciation, in the Vatican Pinacoteca. This painting contains a number of unique features and uses the so-called ut vitrum metaphor, that is a special use of light creating glass-like images. Gentile also demonstrates this technique in the predella. The Nativity scene contains three different sources of light (the moon, the angel above and the Christ child) and represents the first realistic depiction of night in Renaissance art.

=== Rome (1427) ===
In 1427 Gentile arrived in Rome. There, he was commissioned by Pope Martin V to decorate the nave of the Basilica of St. John in Lateran. However, Gentile is known to have died soon thereafter, before 14 October 1427. The nave would later be completed by Pisanello after Gentile's death. Gentile was reported buried in the church now called S. Francesca Romana in Florence, but his tomb can no longer be traced there; other sources report that he may be buried in the church of Santa Maria in Trastevere, in Rome.

== Arabic influence: Mamluk metalwork ==
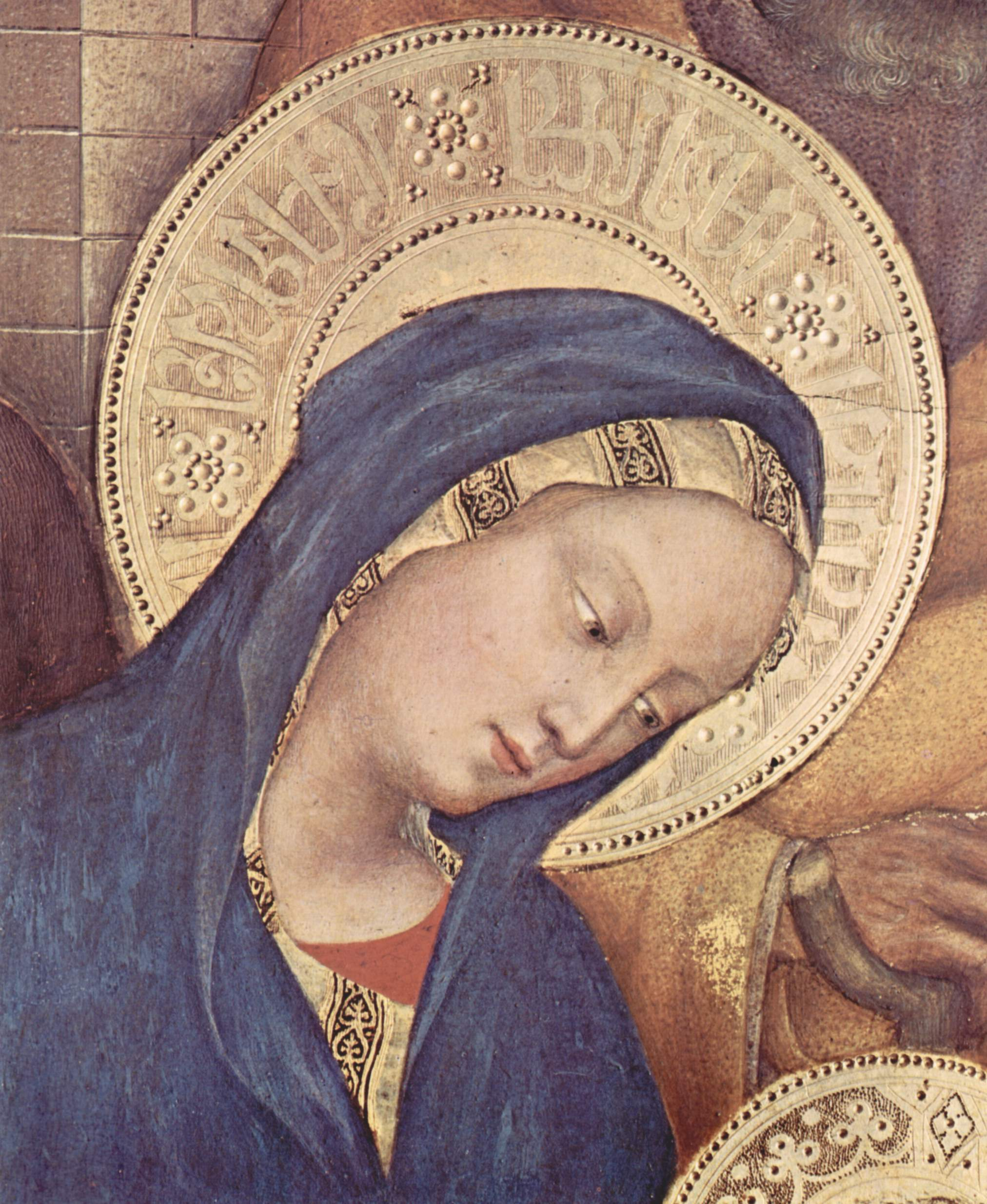
Adoration of the Magi detail, 1423

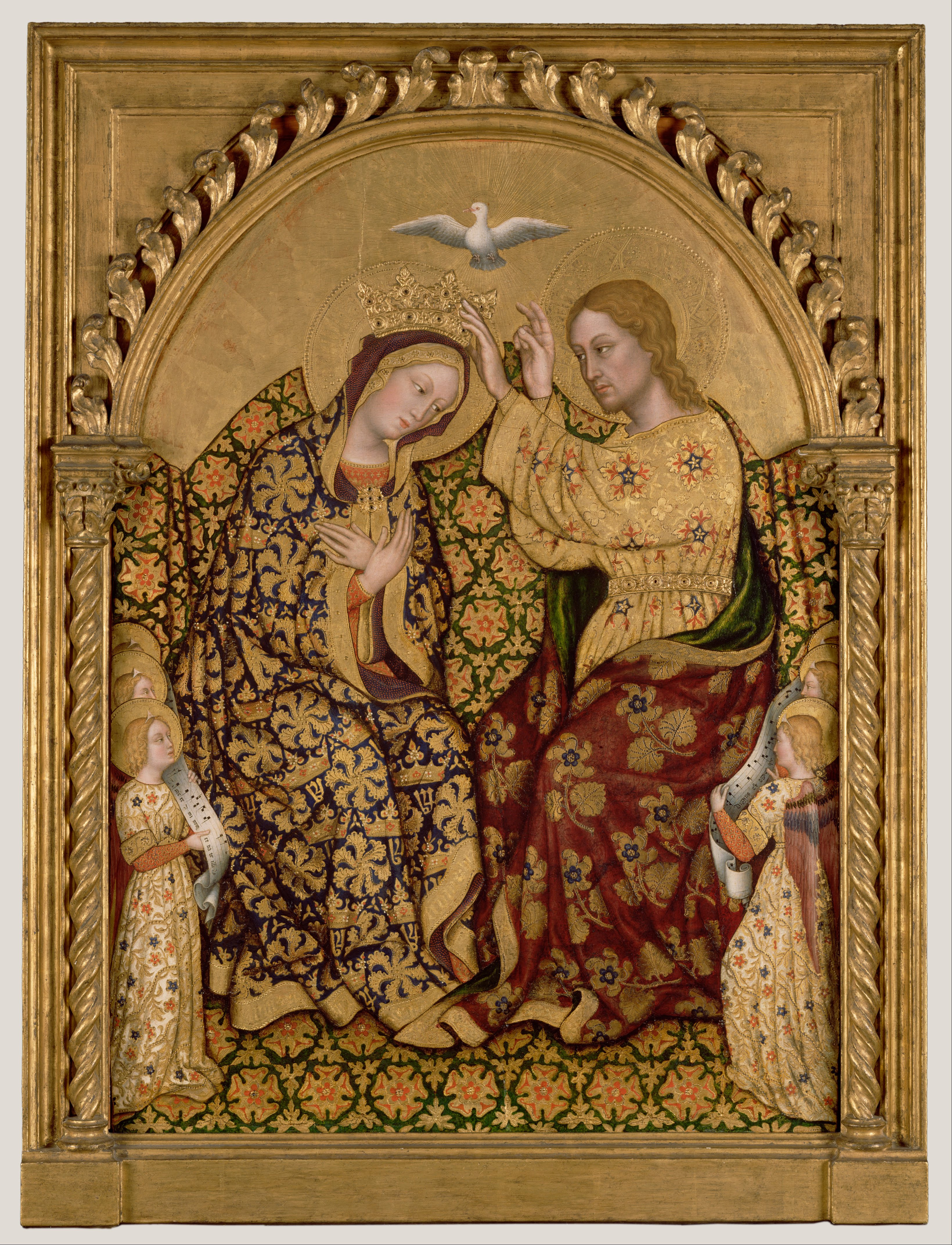
Coronation of the Virgin, c. 1420

The Mamluk Sultanate is well-known for its production of metalwork objects, most of which include inscriptions in Arabic script. Venice was among the early important centers of trade for Islamic goods in Europe, and in turn, traditional Islamic forms were highly desired by European patrons because of their associations with "exotic" Other of Jerusalem and the Holy Land. Halos painted with patterns based on Mamluk metalworks reveal the types of commercial and artistic exchanges that were taking place in other Italian city-states, like Florence. The fact that Florence secured two major seaports, Pisa and Livorno, in 1406 and 1421 respectively, illustrates the increased diplomatic ties between the Florentines and Mamluks.

By the late thirteenth century, artists like Duccio and then later in the early fifteenth century, Gentile da Fabriano, were influenced by these types of Mamluk metalwork pieces and started to incorporate their patterns and motifs into their paintings. In Gentile da Fabriano's Adoration of the Magi (1423), pseudo-Kufic inscriptions line the cloaks of several figures. Such inscriptions also appear in the bold, ornamented halo of the Virgin Mary and Joseph, which are divided into four equal parts by rosettes, a design that derives from Mamluk plates. An example of a Mamluk plate of the time is the Mamluk Philae Dish (c. 1345–1360), where four rosettes divide the Arabic script into quadrants.

Halos with pseudo-kufic inscriptions are reflected in several of Gentile da Fabriano's paintings that were produced during his time in Florence including the Coronation of the Virgin from around 1420 and a Madonna with Child and Angels that is part of the Quaratesi Polyptych (1425). Moreover, Gentile da Fabriano's use of halos with Arabic inscriptions influenced other artists, including painter Masaccio, who began his use of pseudo-kufic halos as early as 1422, and can be seen later in his Pisa Altarpiece from 1426.^{ref?}

== Sources ==
- Mack, Rosamond E. (2001). Bazaar to Piazza: Islamic Trade and Italian Art, 1300–1600. University of California Press. ISBN 0-520-22131-1.
- Gentile da Fabriano e l'altro Rinascimento, catalogo della mostra (in Italian). Fabriano: Electa. 2006. Exposition lasting 21 April–23 July 2006.
- Marcelli, Fabio (2005). Gentile da Fabriano (in Italian). Silvana.
- De Marchi, Andrea (1992). Gentile da Fabriano. Un viaggio nella pittura italiana alla fine del gotico (in Italian). Federico Motta (published 2006).
- Łada, Justyna (2004). Obraz Maryi z Dzieciątkiem Gentile da Fabriano jako przykład typu Madonny (in Polish). Roczniki Humanistyczne KUL.
