= Deposition of Christ (Fra Angelico) =

Painting by Fra Angelico

Deposition of Christ by Fra Angelico
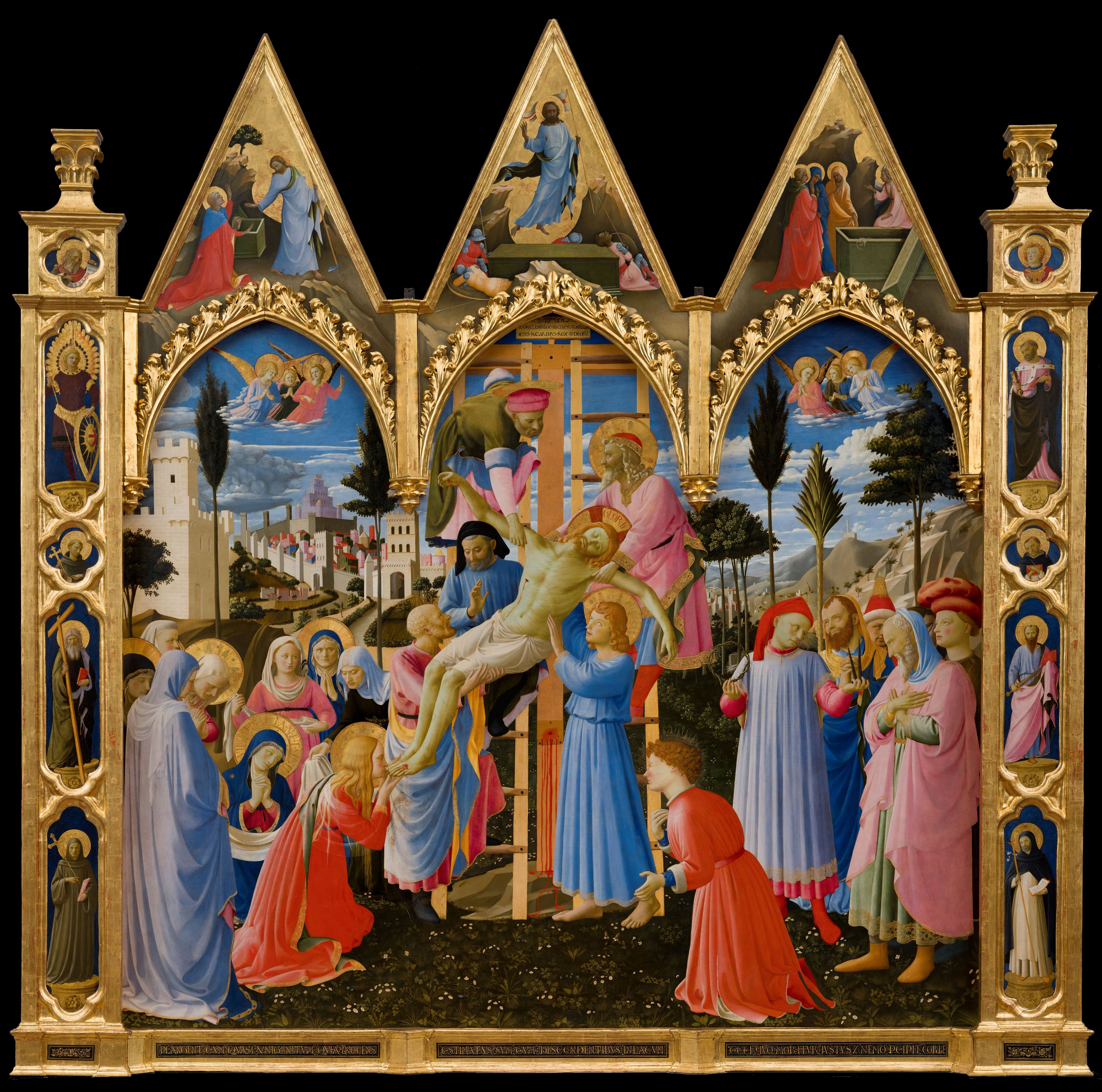
- Artist: Fra Angelico and Lorenzo Monaco
- Year: c. 1432–1434
- Medium: Tempera on panel
- Movement: Early Italian Renaissance
- Subject: Removal of Christ from the Cross
- Dimensions: 176 cm × 185 cm (69 in × 73 in)
- Condition: Restored 2025
- Location: National Museum of San Marco, Florence

The Deposition of Christ also known as the Santa Trinita Altarpiece is a painting by the Italian Renaissance artist Fra Angelico, executed between 1432 and 1434. It is preserved in the National Museum of San Marco, Florence.

Giorgio Vasari described it as appearing to have been "painted by a saint or an angel".

== History ==
The altarpiece was originally commissioned to Lorenzo Monaco by the wealthy Florentine banker, humanist and rival of Cosimo de' Medici, Palla Strozzi, for the Strozzi Chapel in the church of Santa Trinita. The commission specified it had to be made in the same dimensions as the one he had commissioned from Gentile da Fabriano: the Adoration of the Magi.

Monaco allegedly completed the paintings in the pinnacles and the predella, but died suddenly in 1425. As a result, Fra Angelico was asked to complete it. The dating of the altarpiece completion by Fra Angelico is debated by scholars.

The commission had a political motivation. Palla Strozzi was one of the richest men in Florence and a leader of the oligarchic faction opposing the Medici. The opulence of the work and its location in a prominent church asserted the Strozzi family's status and piety. However, Palla Strozzi was exiled from Florence in 1434, the same year the altarpiece was likely completed or shortly thereafter.

== Composition ==
Monaco had divided the main panel using columns to depict three individual scenes. Although this was typical for altarpieces of the period, Angelico removed the columns to paint one continuous scene. Gentile da Fabriano had taken the same approach in his 1423 work Adoration of the Magi, an imposing altarpiece for the same church also commissioned by Strozzi.

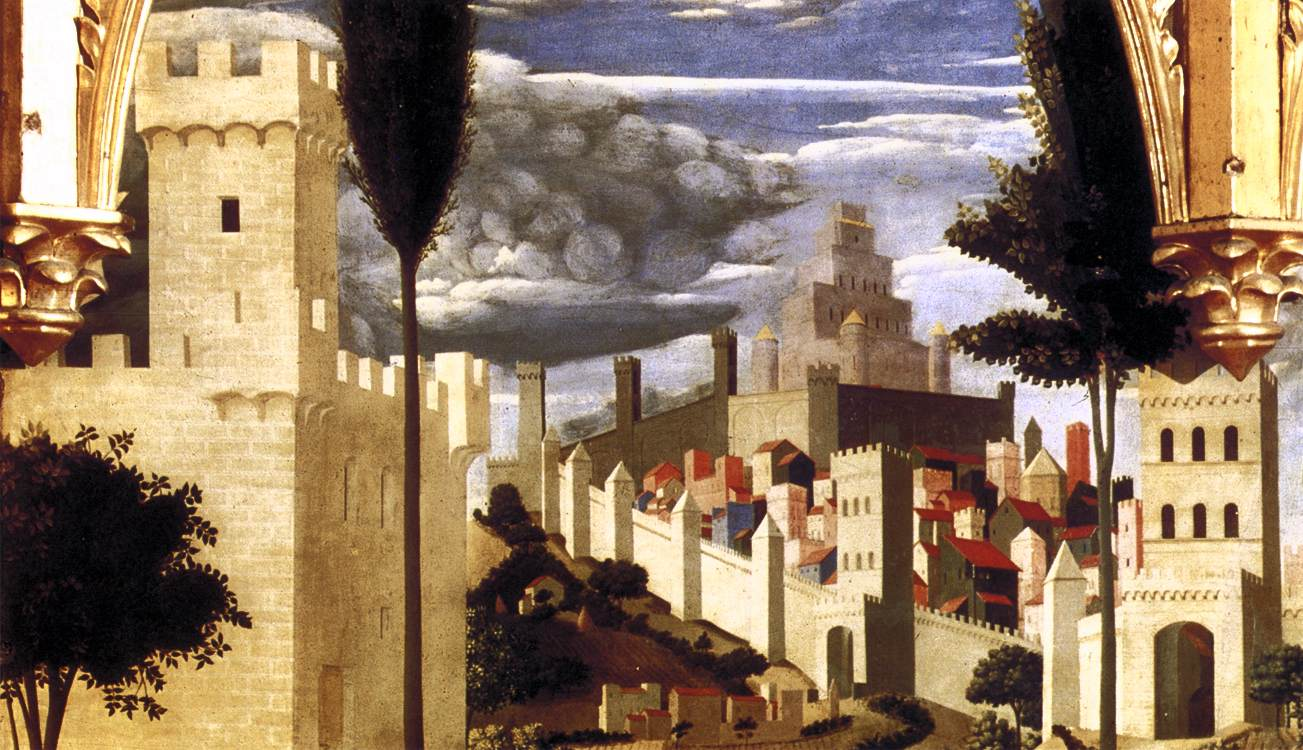
Depiction of a fortified city

Fra Angelico was one of the first painters of the Italian Renaissance to depict figures in a receding landscape. Previous painters placed all figures in the foreground, as in a theatrical presentation.

== Description ==
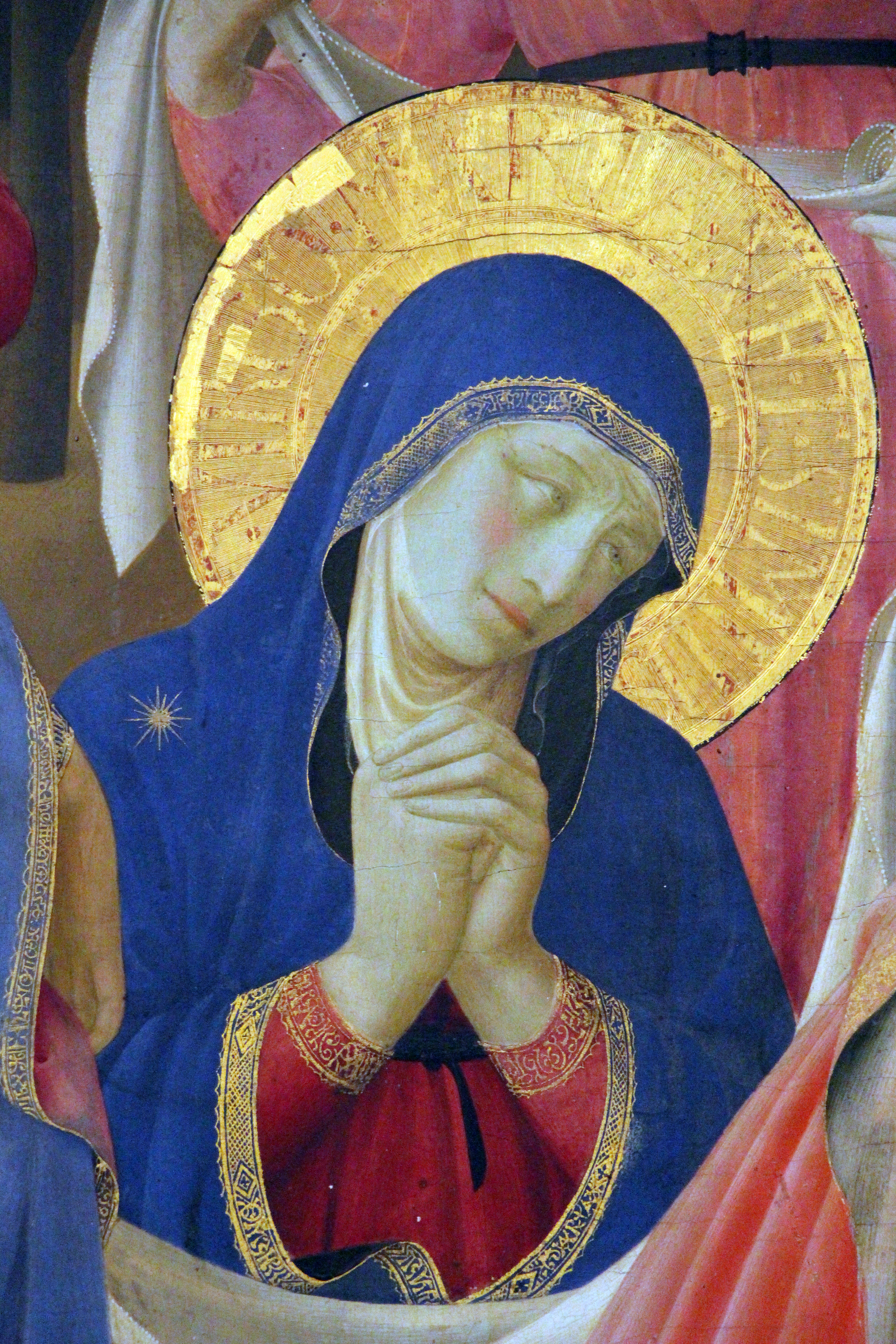
The Virgin Mary in prayer

At the center of the composition, Christ is being lowered from the Cross by Joseph of Arimathea and Nicodemus, who according to the Gospel of John were responsible for the burial of Christ. They are being assisted by three other men, two of them in wooden stairs placed against the Cross. At the bottom of the Cross, Christ's blood flows into a trapezoidal rock base which according to medieval iconography, represents man's redemption from sin through Christ's sacrifice.

Mary is praying and can be identified by her traditional lapis lazuli blue mantle. In front of her, Mary Magdalene is shown kissing Christ's feet. To the left, a group of women are preparing to receive Christ's the body in the shroud. A group of men on the right are depicted as scholars with Florentine dress, are discussing the symbols of the Passion. The man with the red chaperon holding the crown of thorns and the three nails of the cross is believed to be the donor, Palla Strozzi. The figure with the black hood behind Christ is the sculptor and architect Michelozzo, while the young man kneeling in the foreground is believed to be his son Alessio Strozzi. The background shows two different scenes: in the left a fortified city with towers and in the right, a Tuscan landscape with pine-like trees and hills in the distance. The style was likely inspired by Cortona. The standing figures and the vertical background elements, as well as his placement being at the middle of the pyramidal composition, strongly focus the viewer's attention on Christ.

The ground is covered with a dense mantle of small plants depicted in detail, which may allude to spring as a symbol of rebirth.

=== Color ===
Fra Angelico's mastery of tempera is evident in the luminosity and transparency of the colors, qualities recently recovered in a major restoration completed in 2024. The restoration revealed the brilliance of the landscape, which depicts the Tuscan hills and a turreted city representing both Jerusalem and Florence. The use of light is not merely decorative but theological, enveloping the scene in a divine clarity that enhances the monumentality of the figures. The representation successfully combines the gravity appropriate to the sacred scene with the picturesque liveliness of the environmental recreation. The attention to detail in the character's faces and the background landscapes increases the realism of the scene. Their sharply outlined features are precisely traced, which suggests they are portraits.

Elements of composition in da Fabriano's Adoration of the Magi altarpiece are referenced in Fra Angelico's Deposition, like the layering of figures to create an illusion of dimensionality and the use of the space under the arches to depelop a continuous landscape horizon. Even the fortified city at the top left is an element taken from de Fabriano's altarpiece. However, Fra Angelico's Deposition differs from da Fabriano's work in its wide spatial layout and creating a more contemplative atmosphere, as opposed to the Adoration's luxurious excess.

=== Pinnacles and Predella ===
From left to right, the pinnacles of the altarpiece, painted by Monaco, has depictions of the following scenes of the life of Christ: Noli me tangere, The Resurrection and Mary Magdalene at the Sepulchre. The figures are depicted in the traditional Gothic medieval style, with elongated bodies and a primitive perspective, in a gold, solid background.

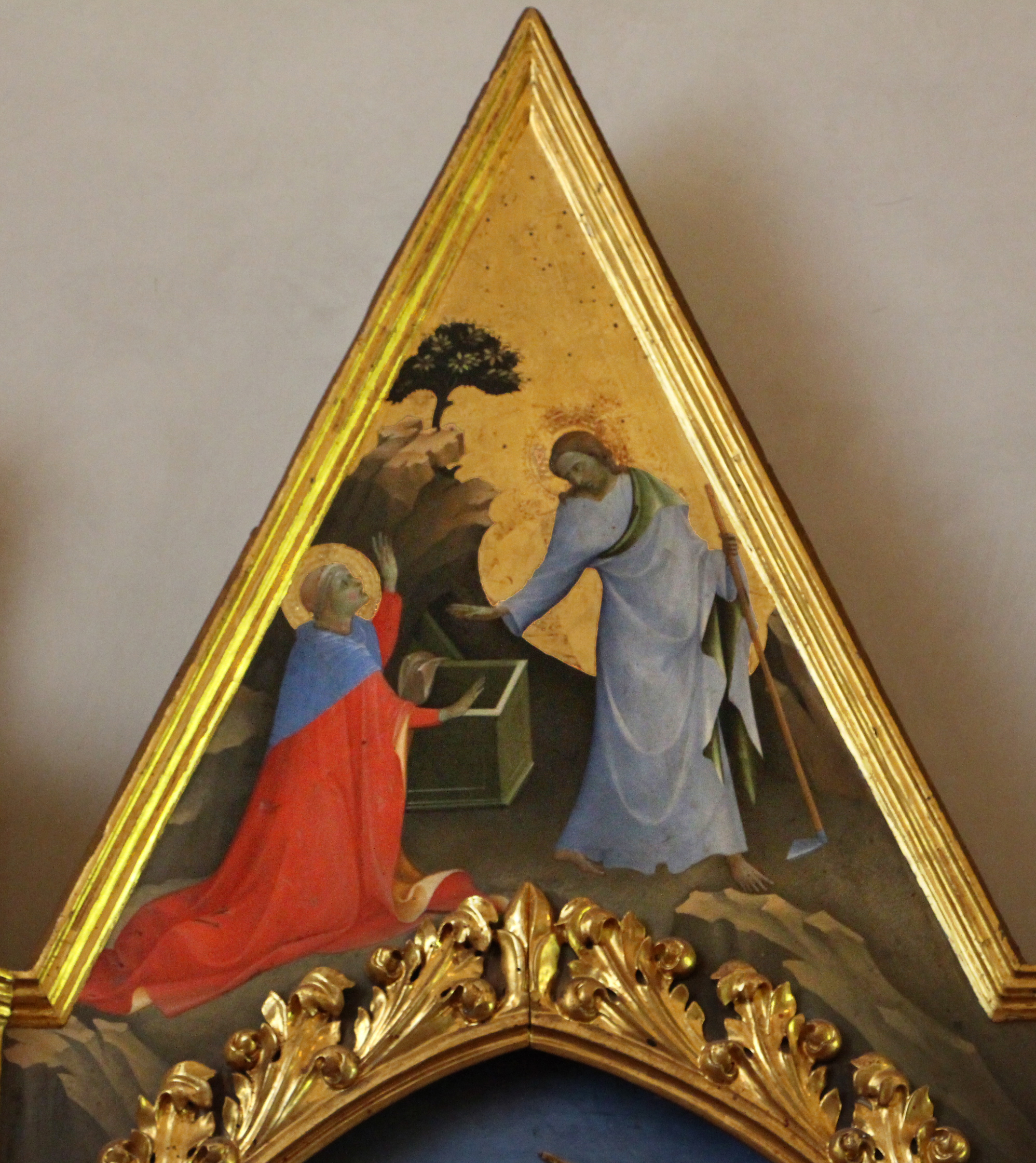

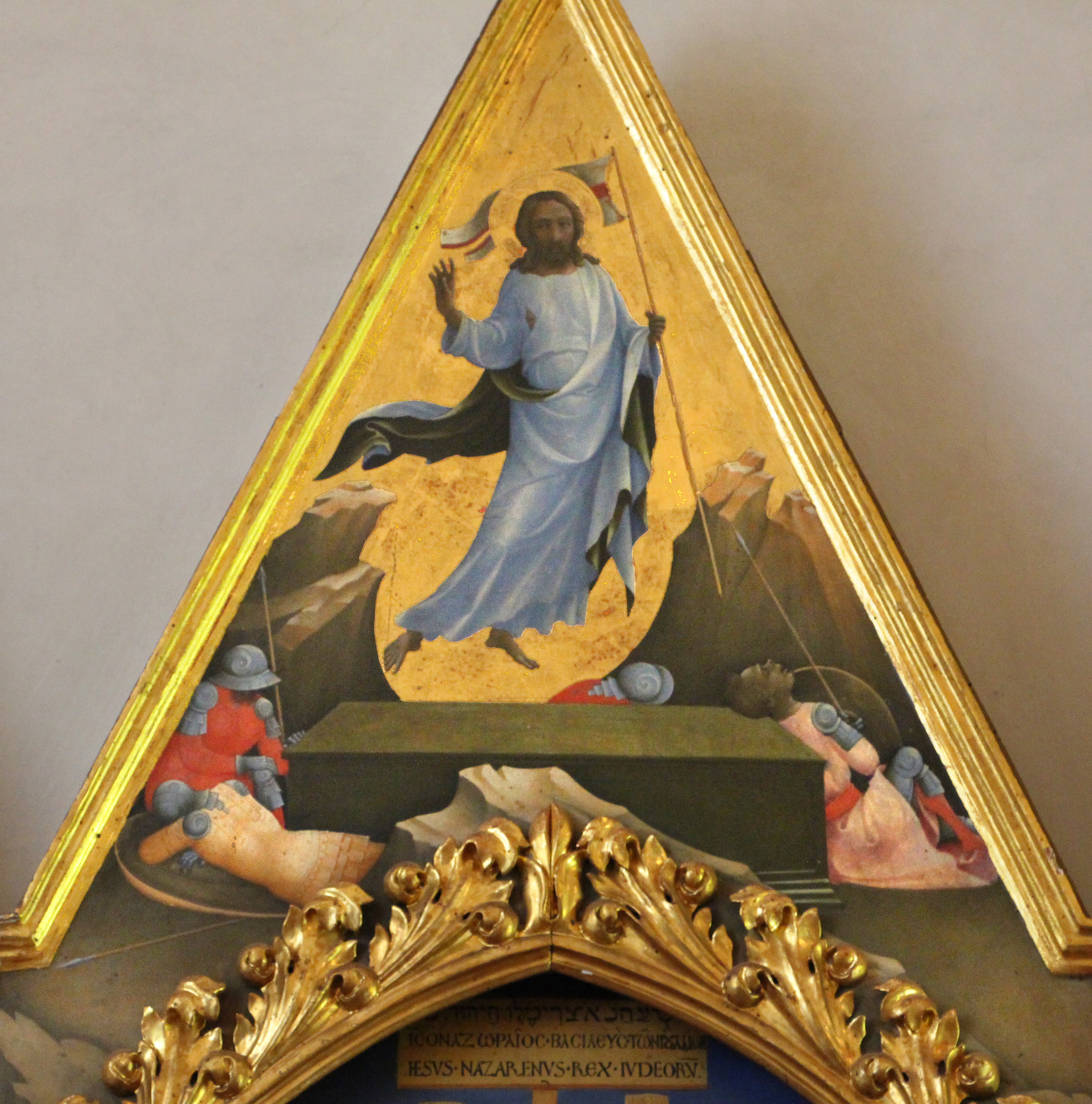

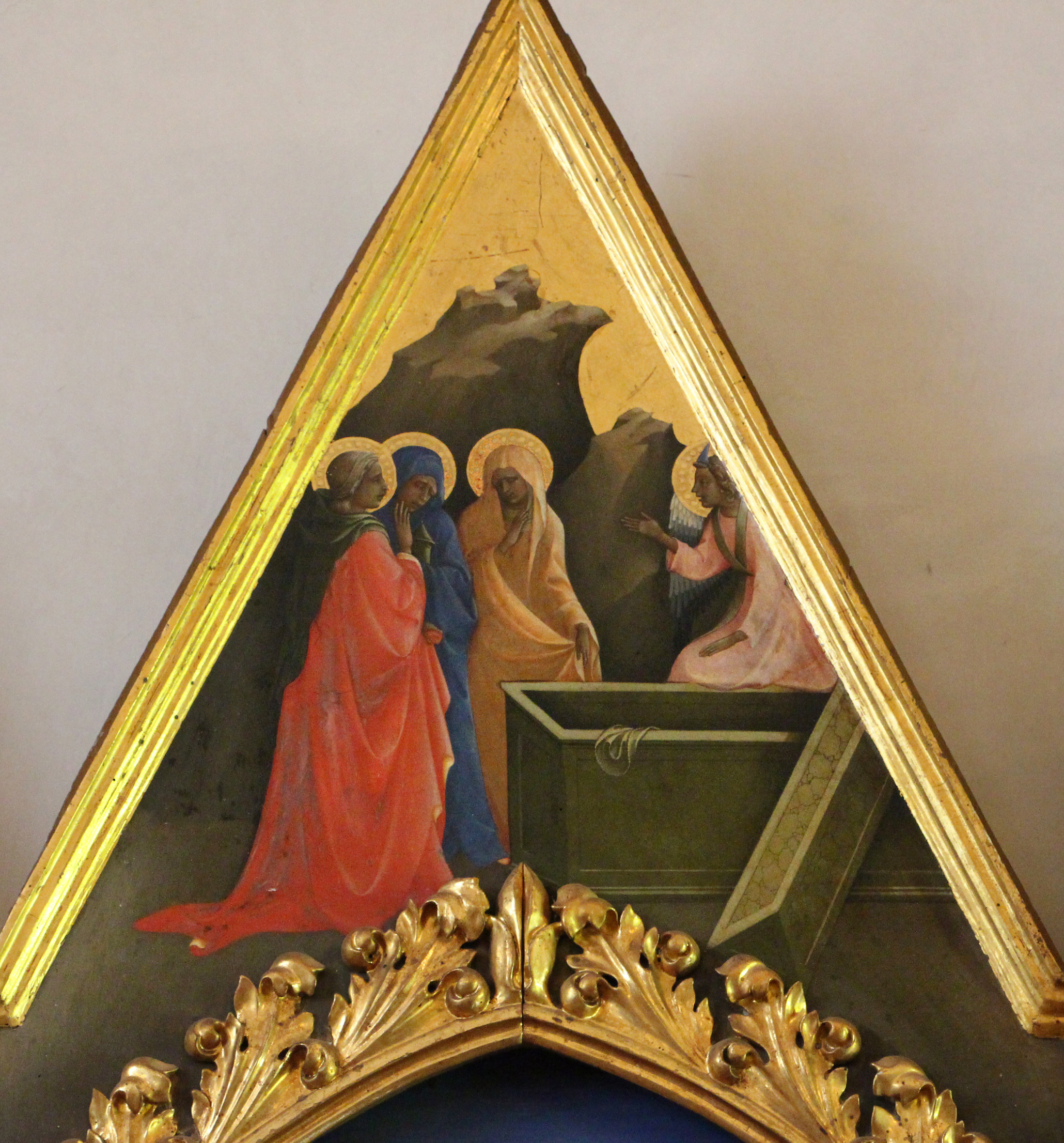

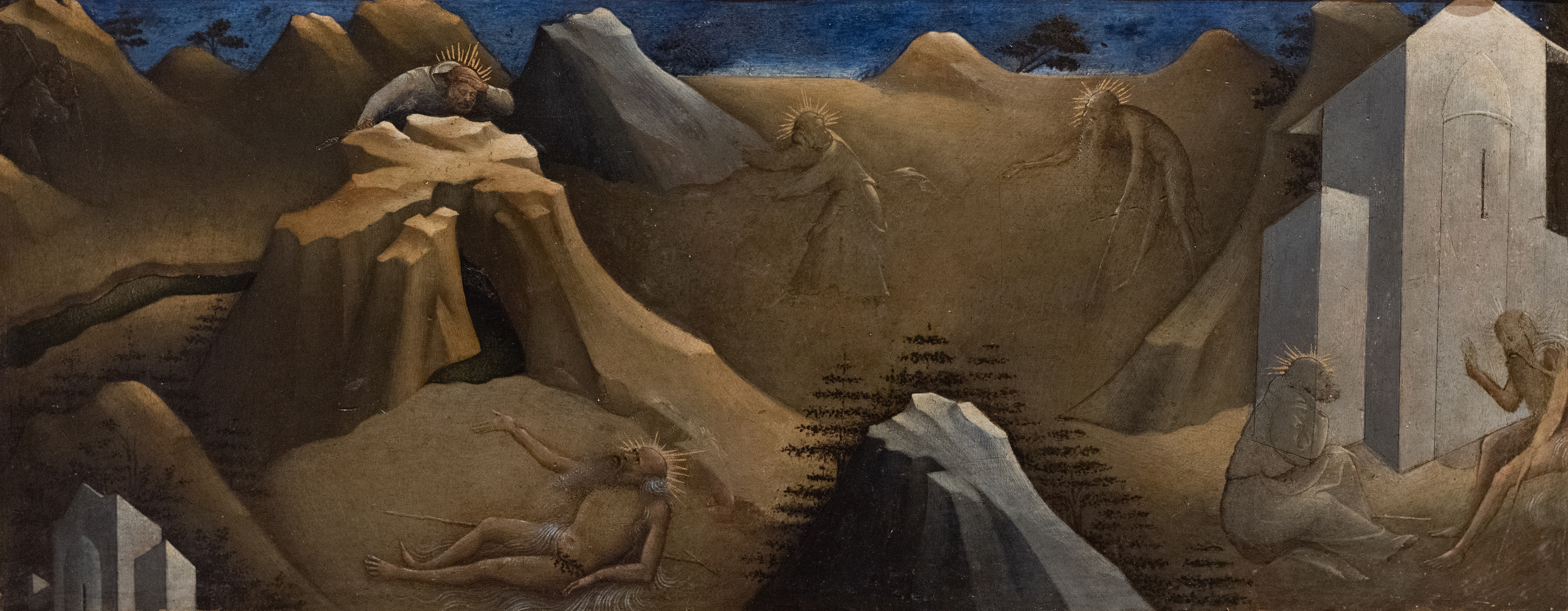

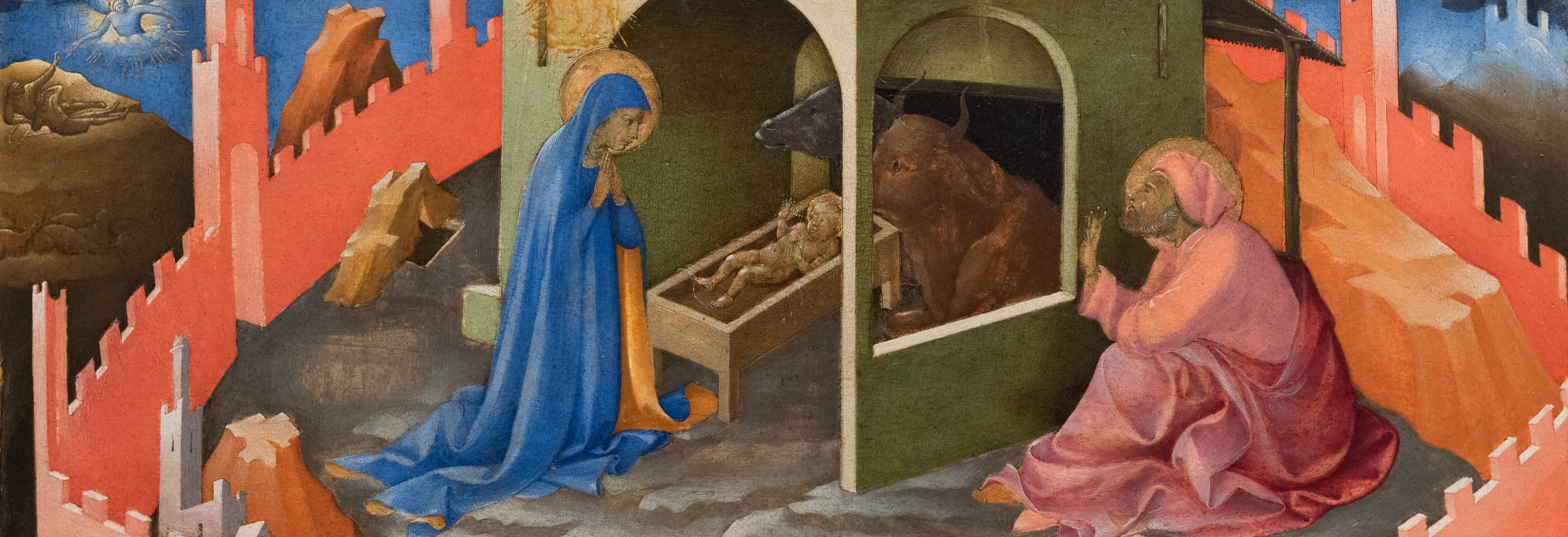

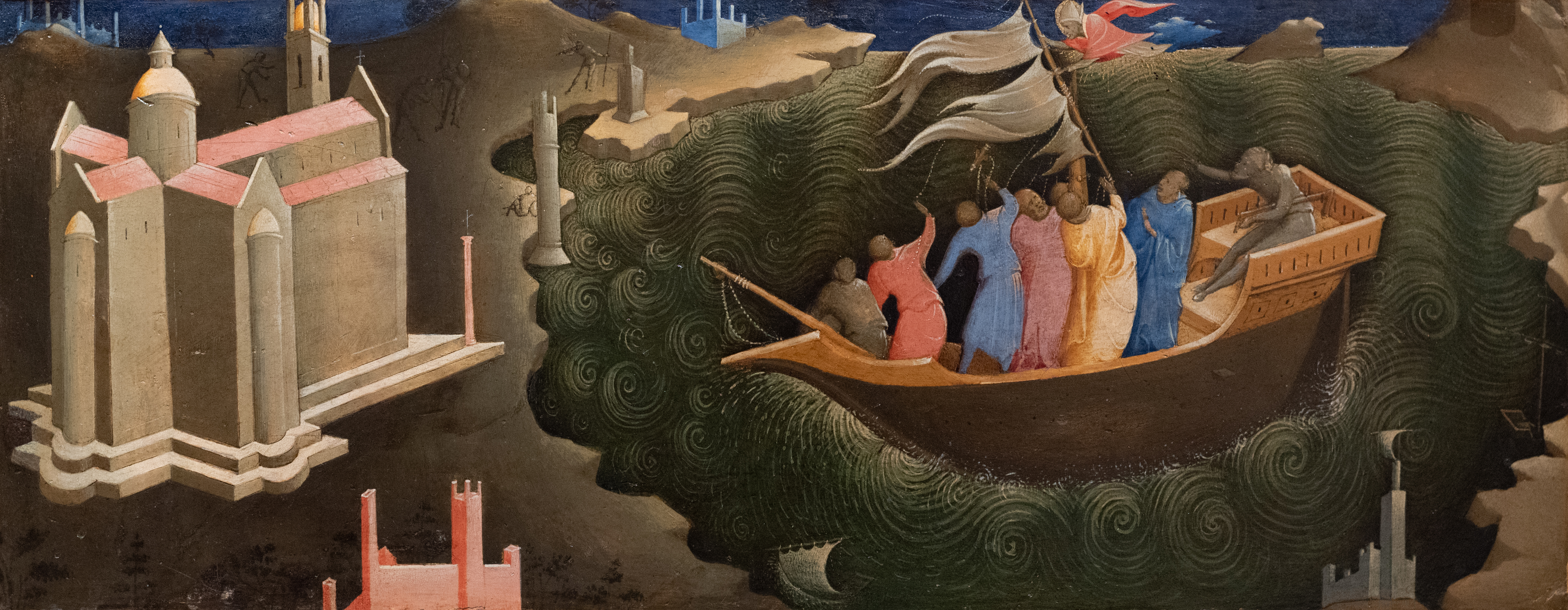

Paintings in the pinnacles and predella of the Deposition (before 2025 restoration)

The three predella images of the altar are also he work of Lorenzo Monaco. From left to right they depict: Saint Onophrius (the patron saint of Palla Strozzi, the donor of the altarpiece), the Nativity and a scene of a ship in rough waters.

=== Pilasters ===
One of the most interesting features of the altarpiece is the intact lateral pilasters and their decoration, with twelve full-length figures of saints and eight medallions with busts, arranged both on the front and the side elevations. The full-length saints rest on gilded bases that have a different inclination depending on their height: those at the bottom reveal the face of the base on which they rest, while those at the top are foreshortened to create the illusion of them being higher than they are.

== Restoration ==
A restoration effort including technical was carried out from 2023 to 2025. It was determined that the last restoration was made in the late 19th century. The main objective was to recover the transparency and luminosity of the painting, especially in the evocative landscape. The other aim was to understand which part of the work was done by Lorenzo Monaco and which by Fra Angelico.

The restoration effort was finished just in time to include the altarpiece in a major Fra Angelico exhibition at Palazzo Strozzi in Florence, in September 2025.

== Legacy ==
The Deposition is a pivotal work of the Early Italian Renaissance as it marks the transition from the International Gothic to the spatial realism and humanism of the 15th century.
