= Madonna and Child (Gentile da Fabriano, Washington) =

C. 1420 painting by Gentile da Fabriano

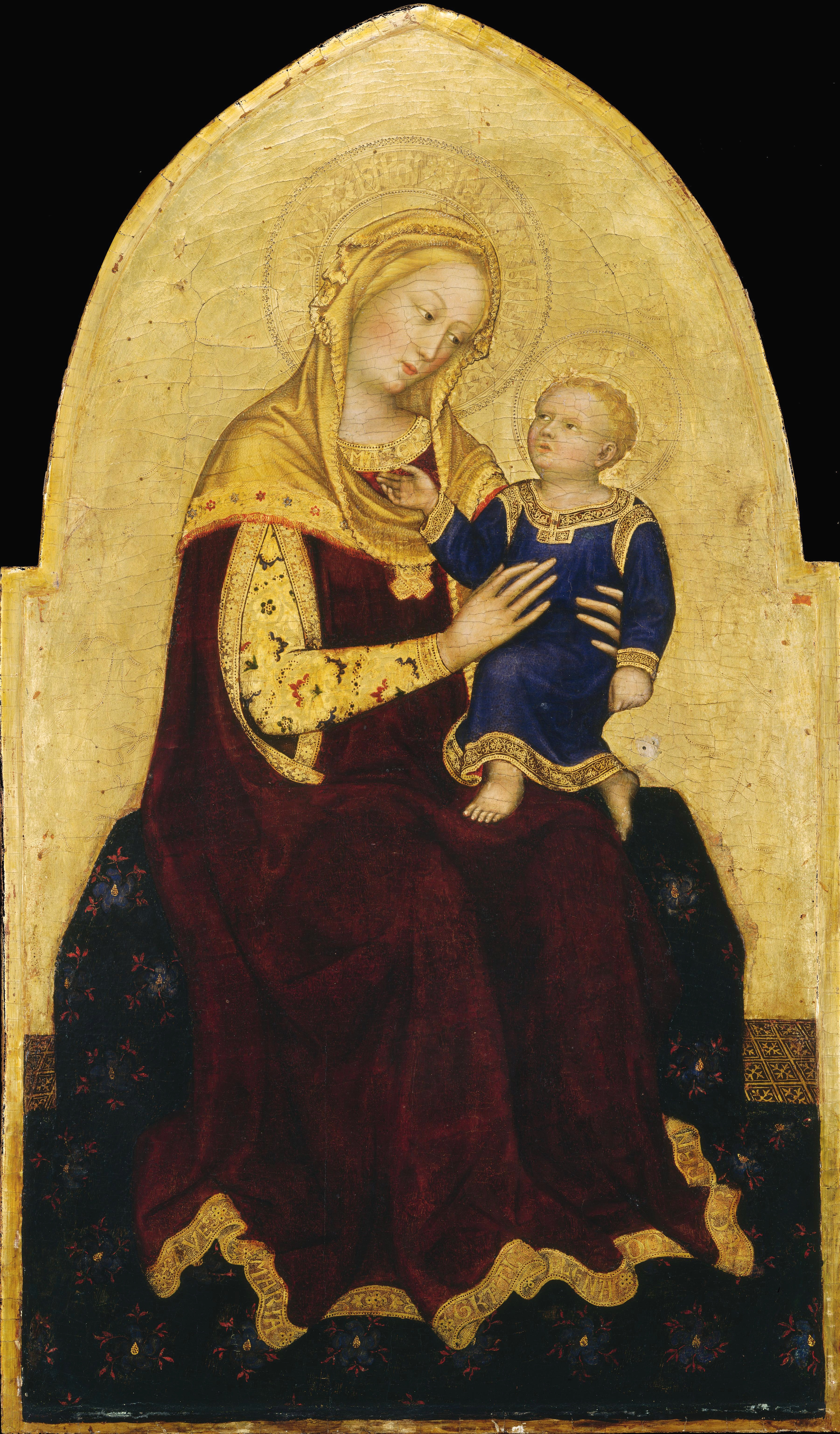
Madonna and Child (c. 1420–1423) by Gentile da Fabriano

Madonna and Child is a tempera and gold on panel painting by Gentile da Fabriano, executed c. 1420–1423, now in the National Gallery of Art in Washington, D.C. The work is generally identified as one of the first the artist produced in Florence, where he had arrived in summer 1420, at roughly the point at which he was working on the Pala Strozzi. It may have been the central panel of a polyptych, the rest of which is now lost.

The first recorded mention of the work dates to 1874, when it was auctioned in London from the collection of Alexander Barker, who may have acquired it in Florence. After several other owners, it was acquired by the Duveen brothers, who in 1937 sold it to Samuel H. Kress, who finally donated it to its present owner in 1939.

== Exhibition History ==
In 1876, the painting was part of the Winter Exhibition of the Exhibition of Works by the Old Masters at the Royal Academy of Arts in London as no. 195, as The Virgin and Child.

In 1910, it was loaned for display with a permanent collection in the Musée des Arts Décoratifs in Paris.

In 1920, the painting was displayed as part of an unnumbered catalogue in the Fiftieth Anniversary Exhibition in the Metropolitan Museum of Art in New York.
