= Palla Strozzi =

Italian banker and politician (1372–1462)

Palla di Noferi Strozzi
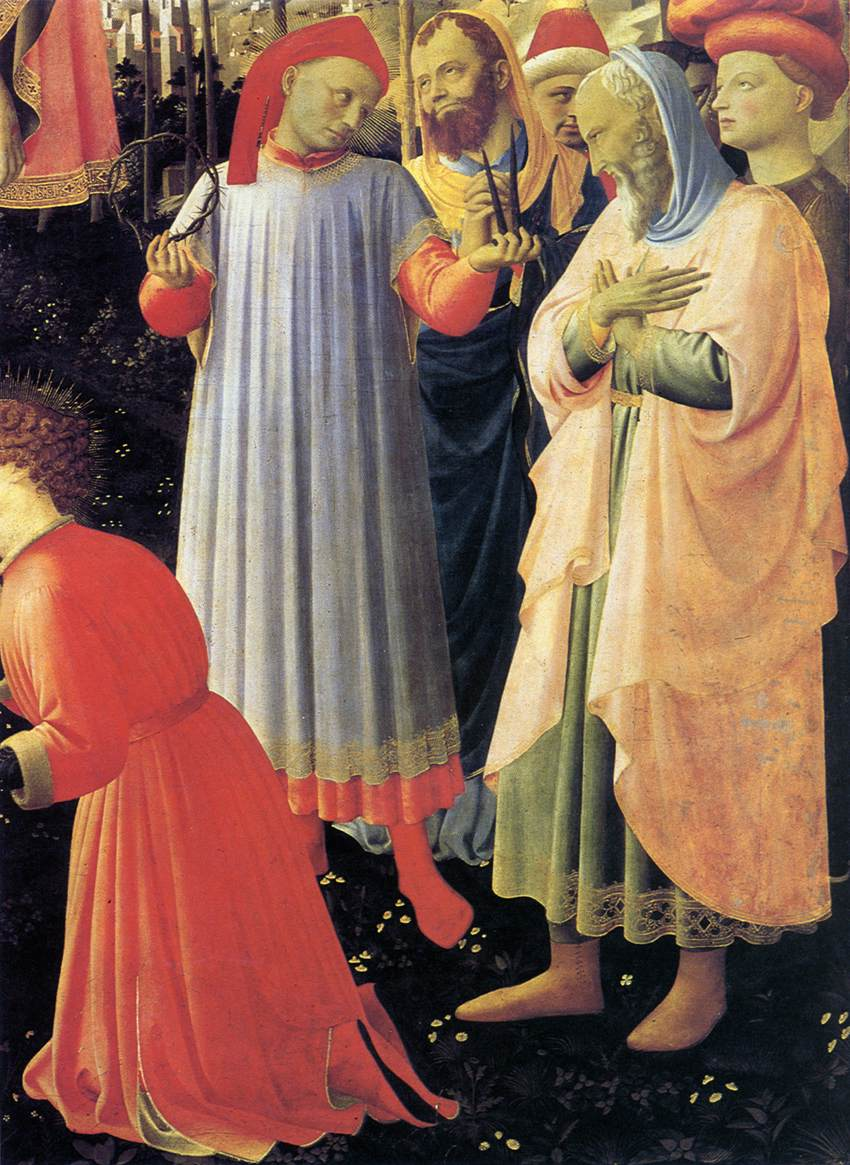
- Palla Strozzi (with nails) in the Deposition by Fra Angelico.
- Born: 1372; Florence
- Died: 8 May 1462 (aged 89–90); Padova
- Other names: Palla Strozzi; Palla di Noferi Strozzi

Palla di Onofrio Strozzi (1372 – 8 May 1462) was an Italian banker, politician, writer, philosopher and philologist.

== Biography ==
He was born in Florence into the rich banking family of the Strozzi. He was educated by humanists, learning Greek and Latin, and establishing an important collection of rare books.

Vespasiano, in his Lives of illustrious men of the 15th century described him as rich, handsome, a family man, a scholar, and a great builder and collector. Palla Strozzi was the richest man in Florence with a gross taxable assets of 162,925 florins in 1427, including 54 farms, 30 houses, a banking firm with a capital of 45,000 florins, and communal bonds. Despite his abundant wealth, Strozzi lived well beyond his means and had little interest in his family’s banking business, which would help lead to his eventual economic and political downfall in the later half of the 15th century.

In his sixties, together with Rinaldo degli Albizzi, he became the leader of the opposition against Cosimo de' Medici, the man who practically controlled the political power in Florence. Initially successful, the two secured the imprisonment of Cosimo, forcing him into exile in 1433. However, when Cosimo returned, both the Strozzi and Albizzi families were exiled in turn. In 1434, Strozzi moved to Padua, where he started to plan a return to his native city. He was never able to return, though his son did and built a large palace in 1480.

He died in 1462, leaving his collection to the Abbey of Santa Giustina. As patron of the arts, he was commissioner of Gentile da Fabriano's Adoration of the Magi in the Strozzi Chapel of Santa Trinita church in Florence. He additionally commissioned Fra Angelico's Deposition of Christ in the Sacristy of Santa Trinita in Florence.

He is said to have bought manuscripts from Greece, and had translated into Italian, for the Almagest by Claudius Ptolemy; the Lives by Plutarch; works by Plato, and the Politics of Aristotle.

His descendants settled in Ferrara.

== See also ==
- Palazzo dello Strozzino

== Sources ==
- Vannucci, Marcello (2006). Le grandi famiglie di Firenze. Newton &Compton. ISBN 88-8289-531-9.
