= Adoration of the Magi (Gentile da Fabriano) =

Painting by Gentile da Fabriano

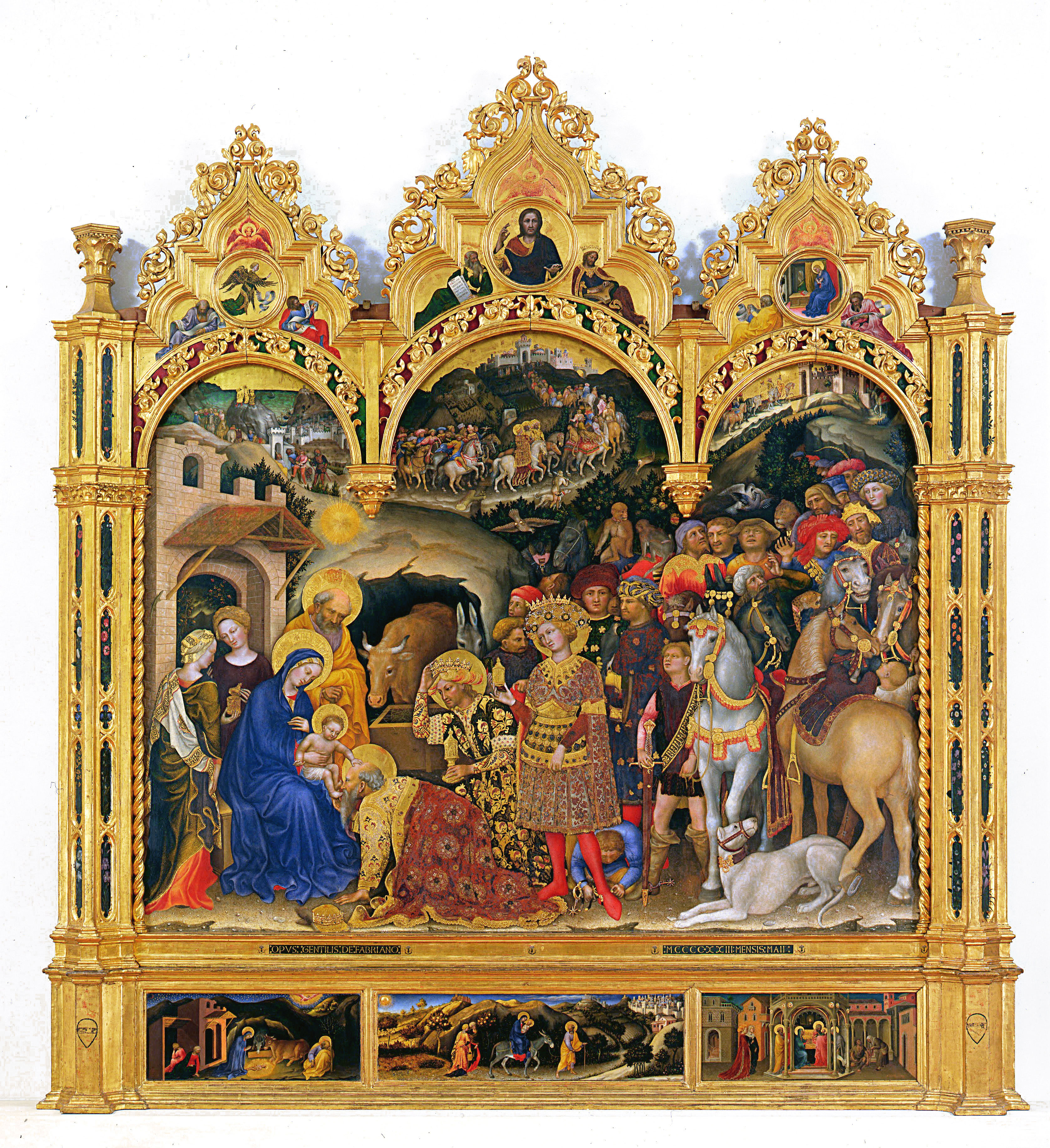
- Artist: Gentile da Fabriano
- Year: 1423
- Medium: Tempera on panel
- Dimensions: 300 cm × 282 cm (120 in × 111 in)
- Location: Uffizi Gallery, Florence

The Adoration of the Magi is a painting by the Italian painter Gentile da Fabriano. The work, housed in the Uffizi Gallery in Florence is considered his finest work and has been described as the culminating work of the International Gothic style.

The artwork was commissioned by the wealthy banker Palla Strozzi. The use of vibrant colors creates a brilliant and imposing effect. Techniques such as lighting, depth, and three-dimensionality are prevalent in the work and were novel for the time. Expensive materials such as gold leaf and jewels are incised in the painting to showcase the patron's wealth.

Other elements of the altarpiece draw upon European conceptions and imagery about the Orient, such as exotic animals, the designs of the three Magis' luxurious clothing and Pseudo-Kufic text.

The gold-leafed frame contains intricate Gothic ornamental architectural designs.

== History ==
In 1420, soon after the arrival of Gentile in Florence, the Adoration was commissioned by the banker Palla Strozzi, one of the wealthiest Florentines of the period.

The theme of the Adoration of the Magi lent itself well to a sumptuous and opulent staging, to showcase the wealth of the patron. At the same time, the merchant class could find legitimacy in the example of the Biblical kings who gave their goods to the infant Christ. The more expensive the artwork, "the more visible the pious transfer of the patron’s wealth to the church." Palla paid a total of 300 florins for the altarpiece, a considerable sum at the time equivalent to six times the annual salary of a skilled labourer.

The painting was intended for the new chapel of the church of Santa Trinita that Lorenzo Ghiberti was finishing during those years.

According to art historian Robert Baldwin, both Palla Strozzi and his father, Onofrio, appear in the painting; Palla as the man in the red hat in the forefront of the painting, and Onofrio as the falcon trainer situated behind the youngest king. According to other opinions, the falcon trainer depicts the commissioner Palla Strozzi with his eldest son Lorenzo to his right.

== Description ==
In this work Gentile expressed the International Gothic style. His detailed representations of the natural world and complex compositions greatly influenced Florentine Renaissance painting.

The artist utilized a naturalistic approach throughout the painting, something quite novel at the time. Notably, the faces of the figures have varied facial expressions. Gentile employs lighter brush strokes creating softer fur, leaves, fabrics, and shadows than other painters during his time.

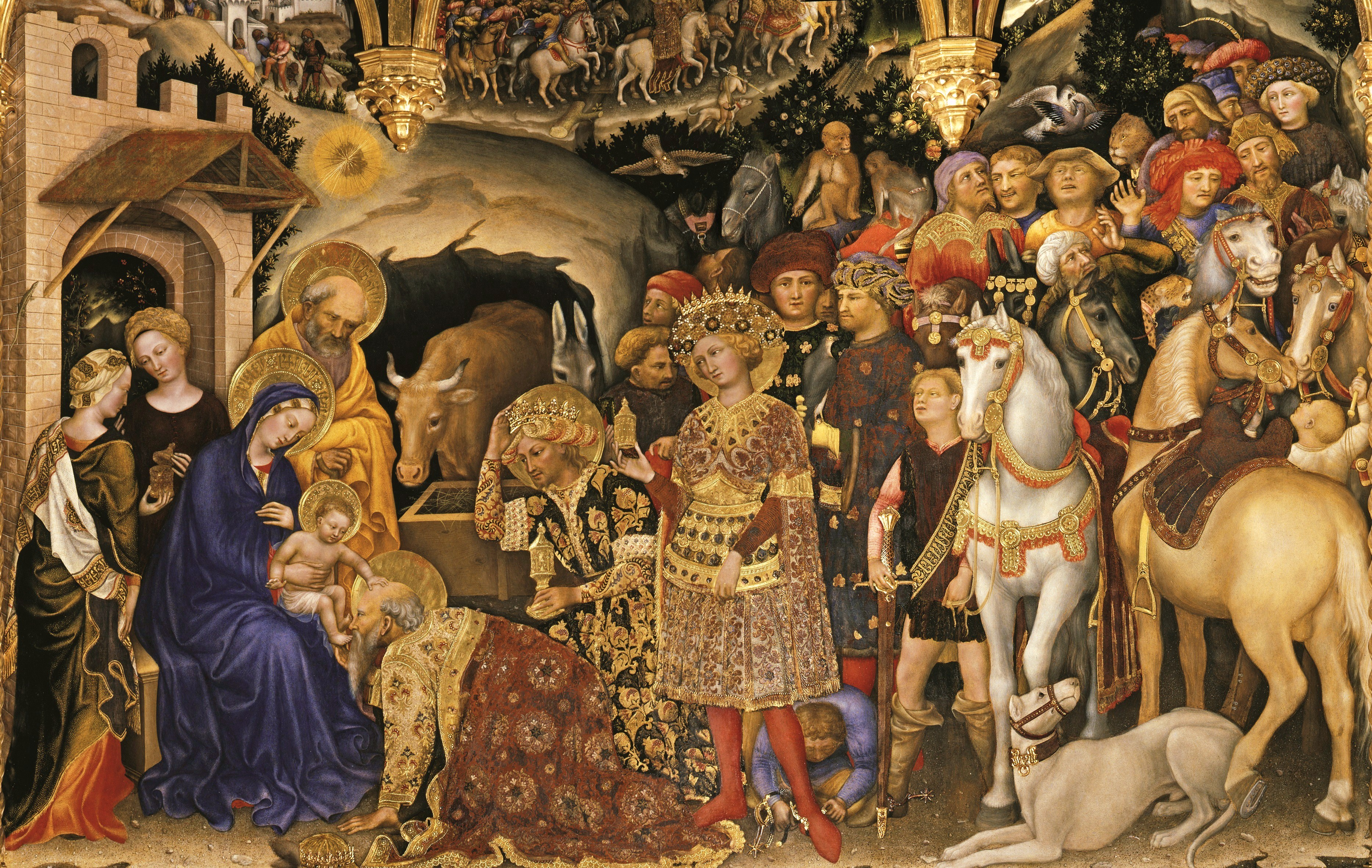
The center of the panel shows the Magi adoring the Christ Child.

The appearance of three-dimensionality is created by layering larger figures on top of smaller ones. In the case of the horses to the right, Gentile also uses foreshortening.

Gentile depicts the Magi's long journey, taking advantage of the arches of the frame to depict three different scenes. On the left, The Magi are shown facing away of the viewer at the start of their trip. In the middle, they are shown about to enter the city of Jerusalem. And in a slim section on the right, they are entering Bethlehem. The procession proceeds clockwise, with a large crowd of figures on the right side wearing splendid Renaissance clothes with brocades, richly decorated with real gold and precious stones that have been inserted in the panel. The Magi occupy the center of the composition, with Joseph and the Virgin Mary with the newborn Jesus on the left. The Magi are depicted taking off their golden crowns to pay their respect.

The profusion of details enrich the narrative

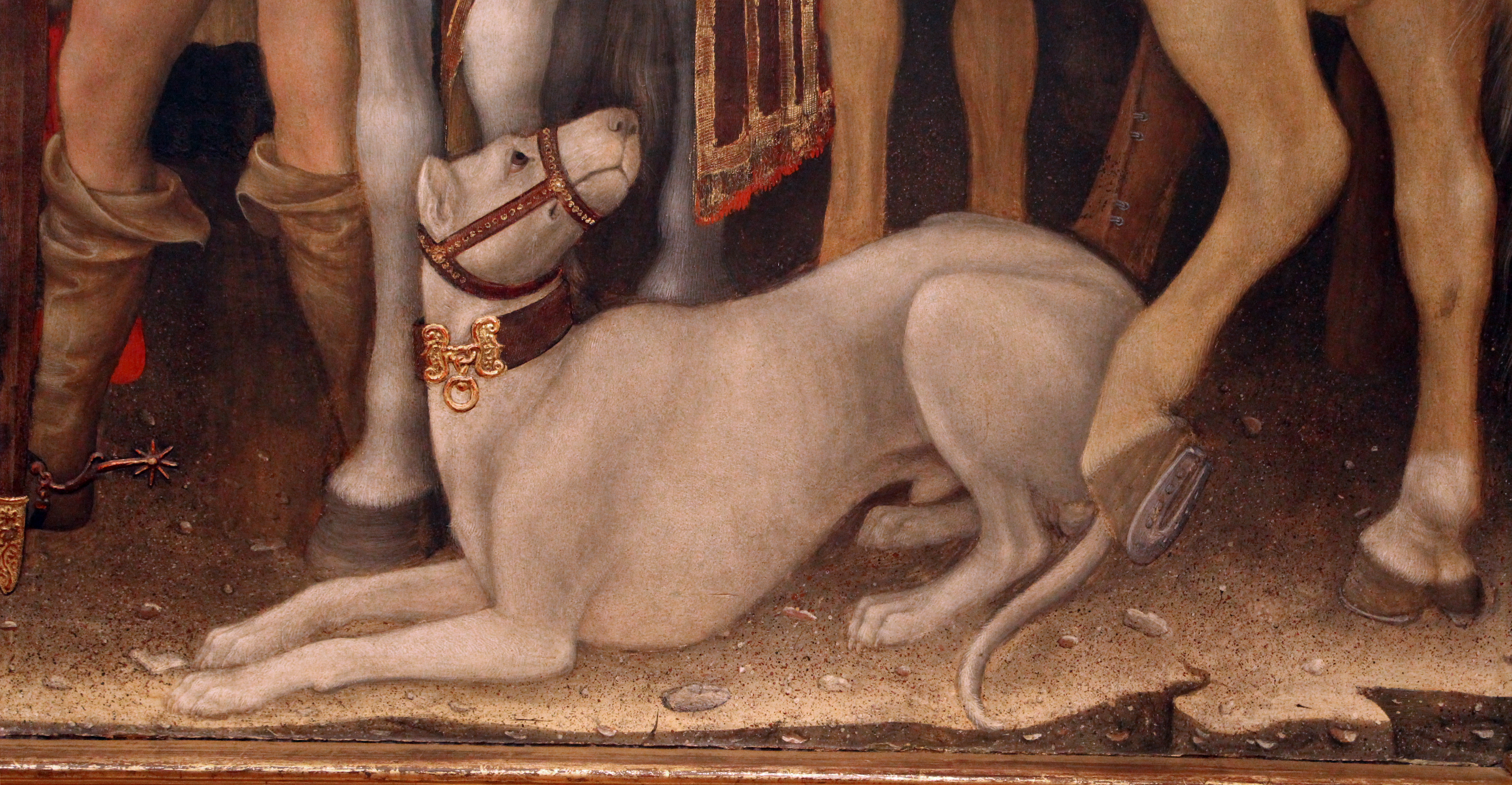
A white alaunt wearing a muzzle.

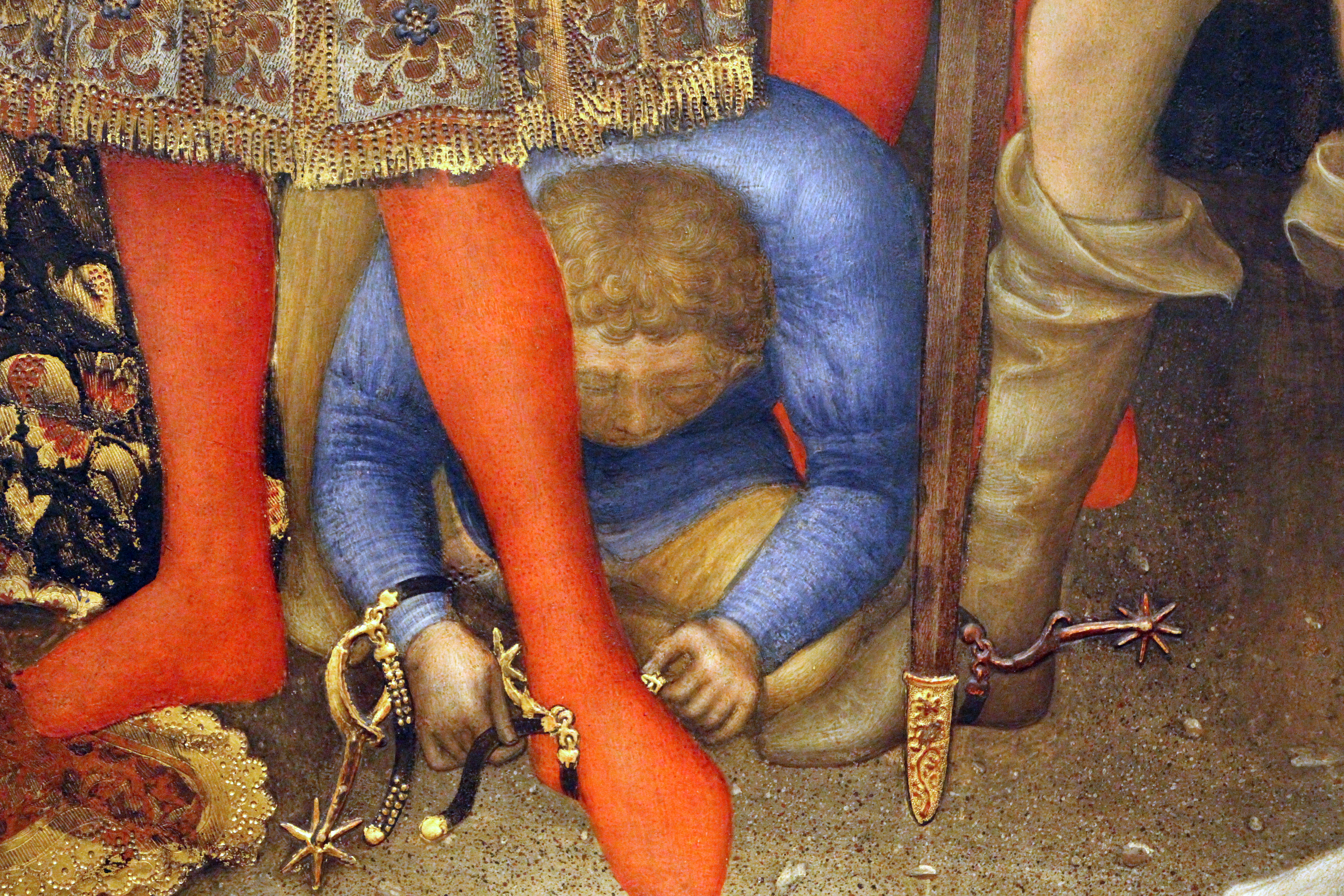
Page putting gold spurs to a Magi.

The painting is filled with countless, carefully observed details absent from most Florentine painting at the time, including many symbolic references that would be easily decoded by its viewers. For instance, a page is shown placing gold spurs to a Magi, a likley reference to the fact that Palla Strozzi was a leading member of the exclusive Order of the Golden Spur; a papal chivalric order in which knighthood was conferred upon those who had rendered distinguished service in propagating the Catholic faith.

In the lower right hand corner, a muzzled, white alaunt is staring at a horse. This (extinct) dog breed was used in Europe for hunting and war due to its fierceness. Dogs in paintings can also be connected to classical antiquity as dogs were commonly depicted in Greco-Roman arts such as Roman sarcophagi.

Gentile includes exotic animals in many parts of the painting, such as leopards, a dromedary, monkeys and a lion to give the impression of visitors from distant lands. Note the leopards mounted behind the riders of the two white horses in front of the Magi in the middle lunette.

Scenes in the lunettes at the top of the panel

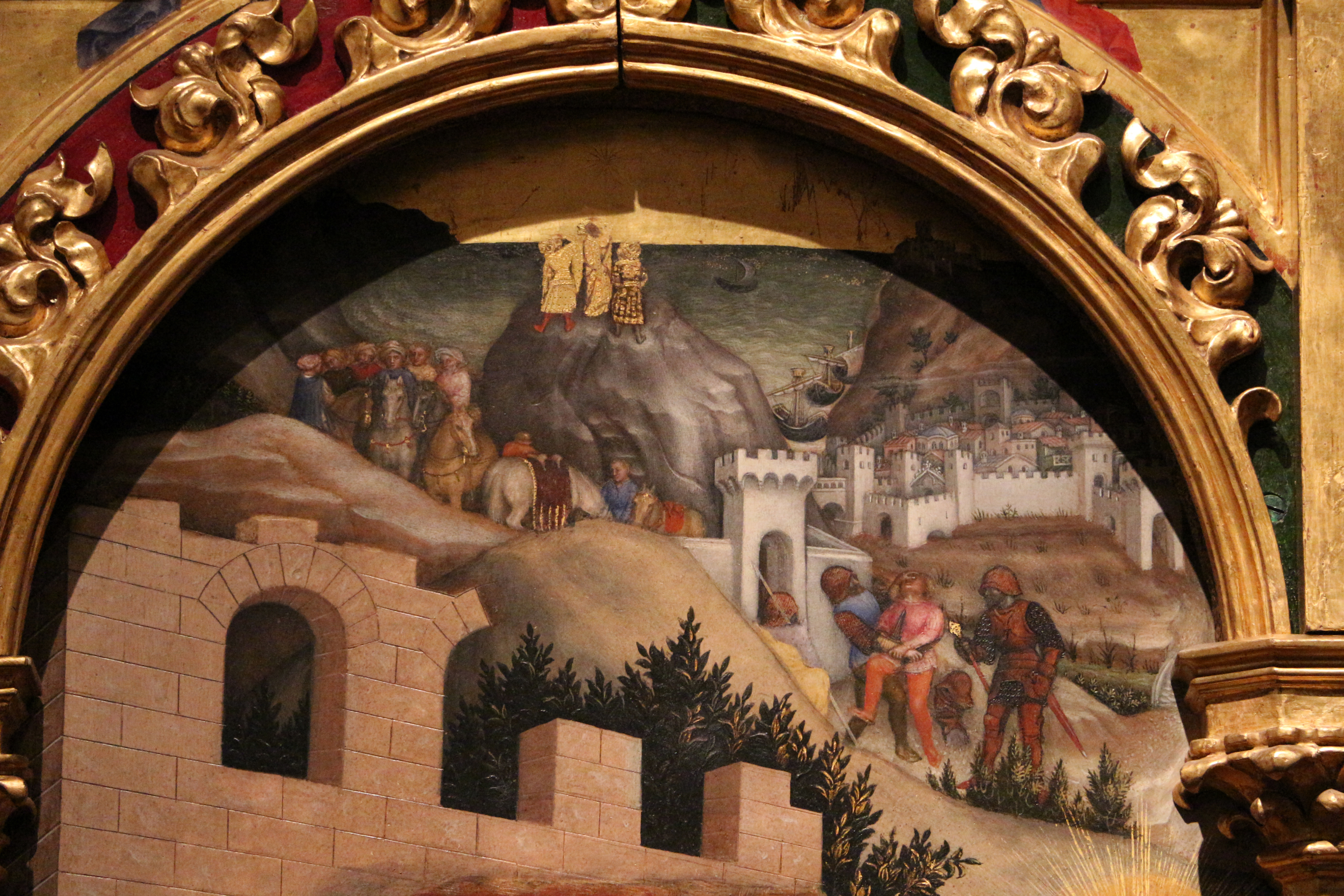
The Three Magi at the start of their journey

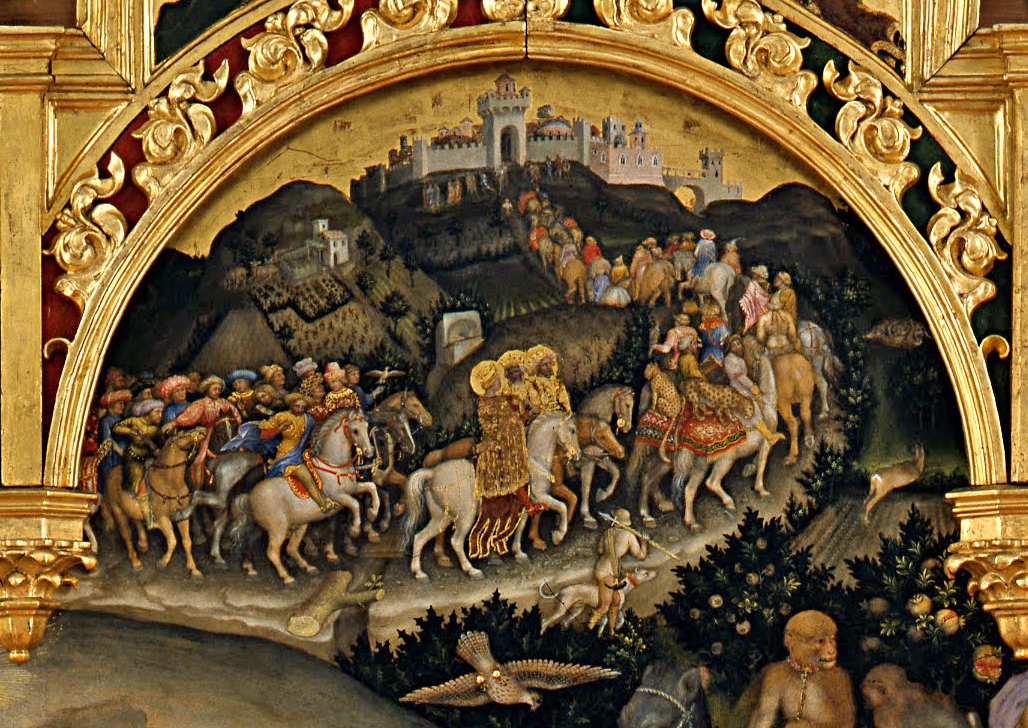
The Magi approaching Jerusalem. Note the two leopards on white horses in front of the Magi.

Predella

The predella has three elongated rectangular paintings with scenes of Jesus' childhood: the Nativity, the Flight to Egypt and the Presentation at the Temple (the latter is a copy, since the original was removed from the altarpiece and is in the Louvre). It is the first altarpiece that is known that is made with panels and frames in two separate pieces. Gentile's incorporation of this self-supporting frame, intended to protect the painting rather that being inseparable from the painting, was influential in the evolution of the purpose of a painting's frame.

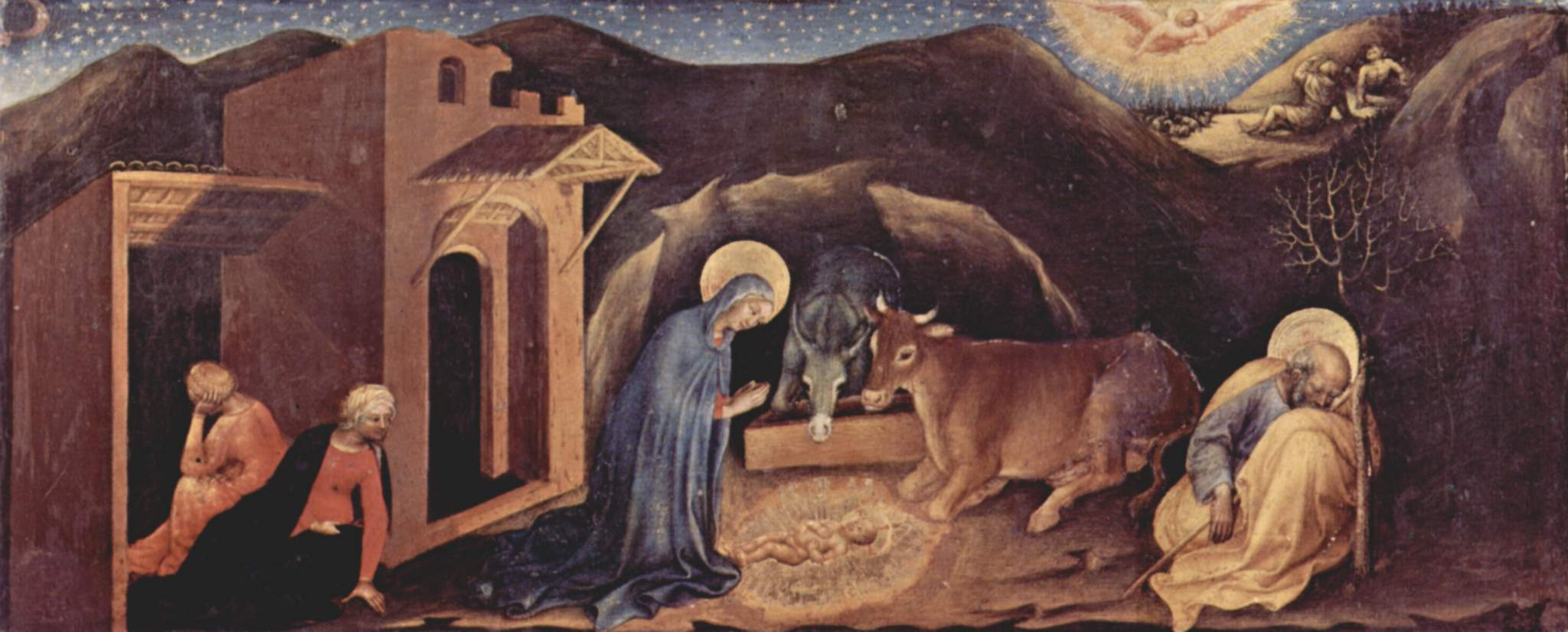
Left: Scene of the Nativity.

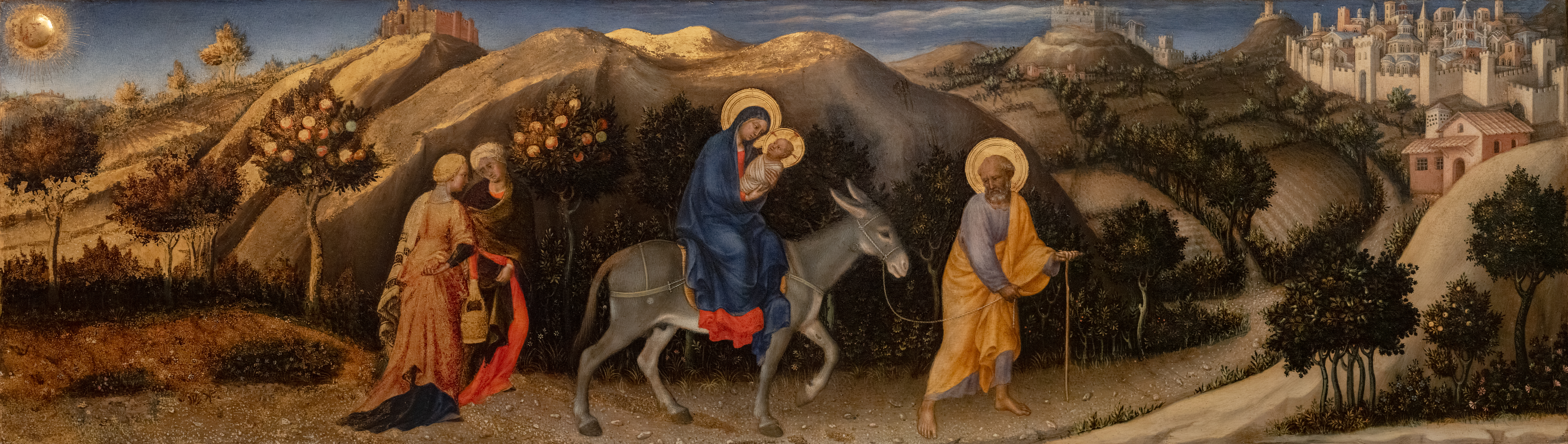
Center: Scene of the Flight to Egypt .

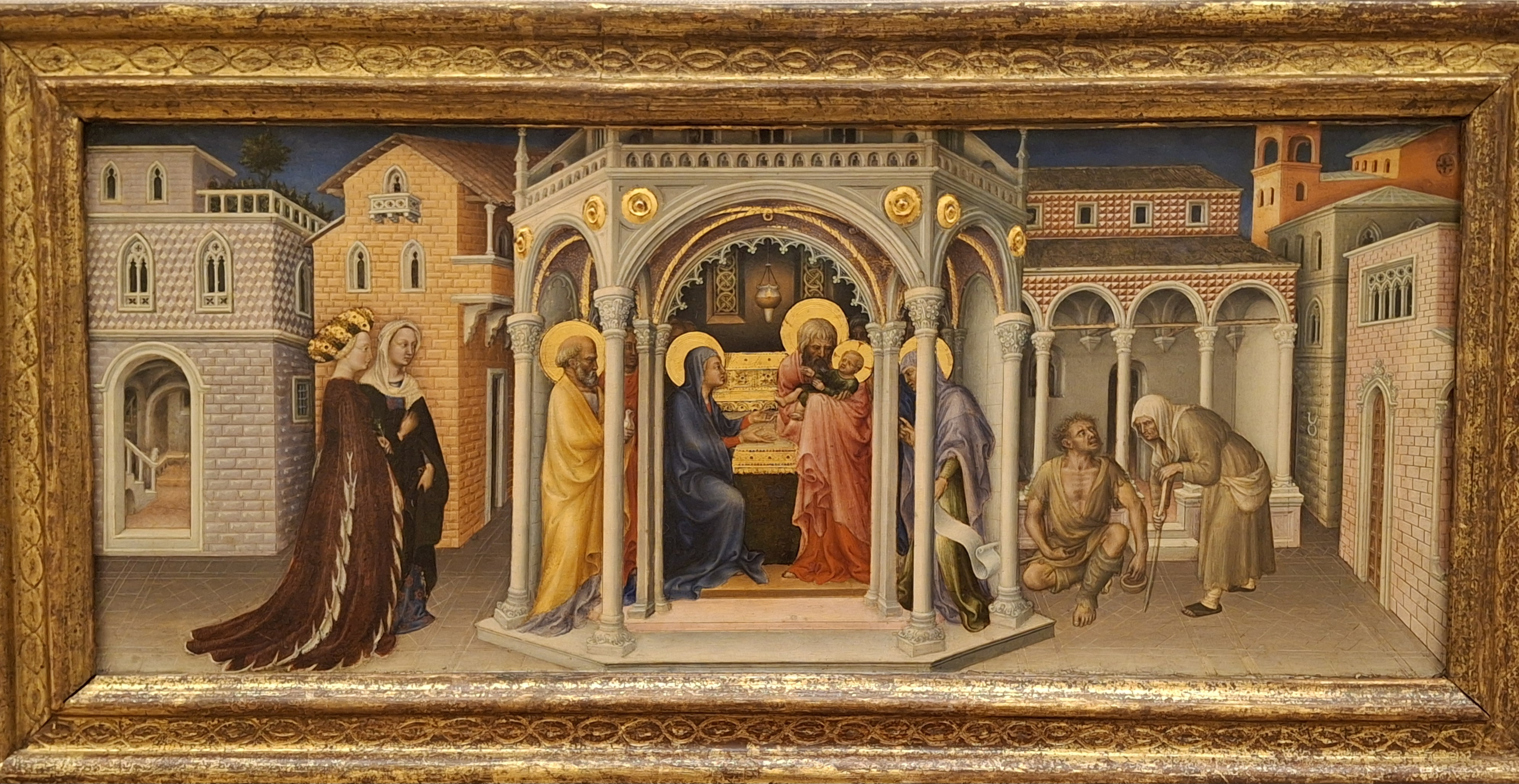
Right: Scene of the Presentation in the Temple.

Materials and Techniques

The whole work is intended to showcase the patron's wealth. The main figures are bejeweled ed and decorated with gold leaf and silver, using the technique of pastiglia to create a rich three-dimensional texture in crowns, textiles, and spurs. Mary's blue robe was painted using the expensive color ultramarine.

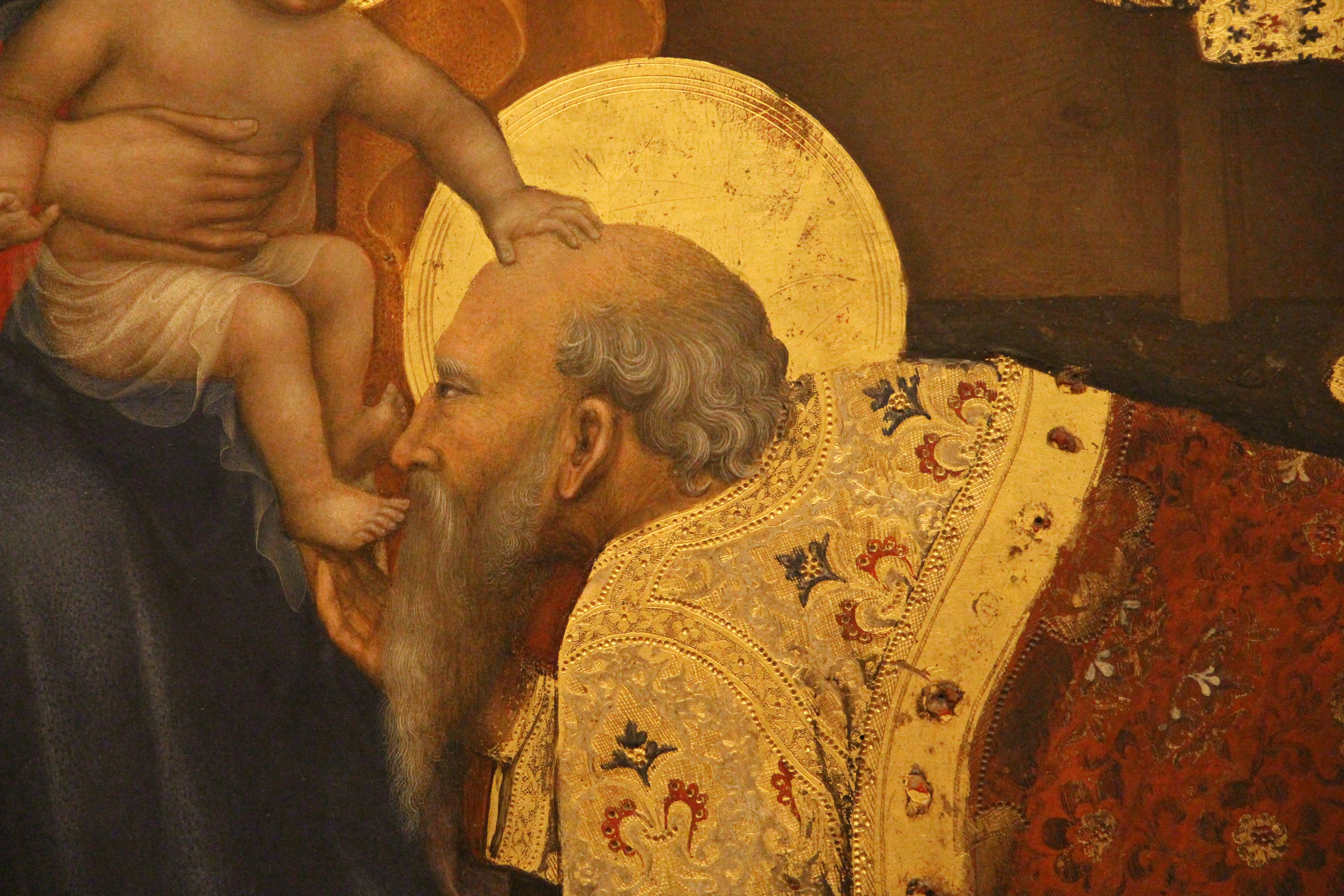
Detail of Magi kissing the feet of the Christ Child with close-up of the gold leaf work.

== Architectural frame ==
The frame of the Adoration of the Magi was almost certainly designed by Gentile.

It is designed in an International Gothic style and adapts several elements the façade Orsanmichele church in Florence, designed by Lorenzo Ghiberti, including the thin colonnettes of the niches of the statues and the lambrequin arches and filigreed design of its window arches. Gentile also included painted flowers on some of the piers, a rare feature. The frame is also characterized with polychromy, gold, and silver, all of which contribute to its dazzling impact.

The frame has three cusps with tondos portraying Christ Blessing (center) and the Annunciation, with the Archangel Gabriel on the left and the Madonna on the right. The three arches of the frame help to clearly separate these narratives from the three scenes below that depict the journey of the Magi.

Architectural details of the façade of Orsanmichelle Church, Florence

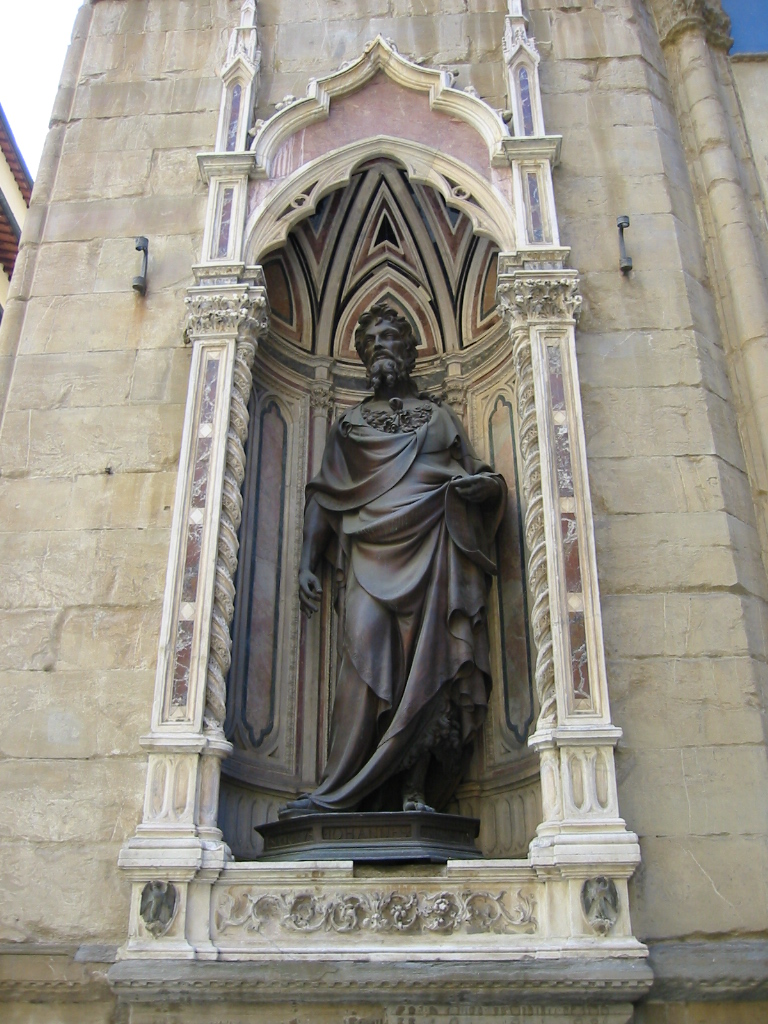
Niche of Saint John the Baptist. Notice the Gothic columns.

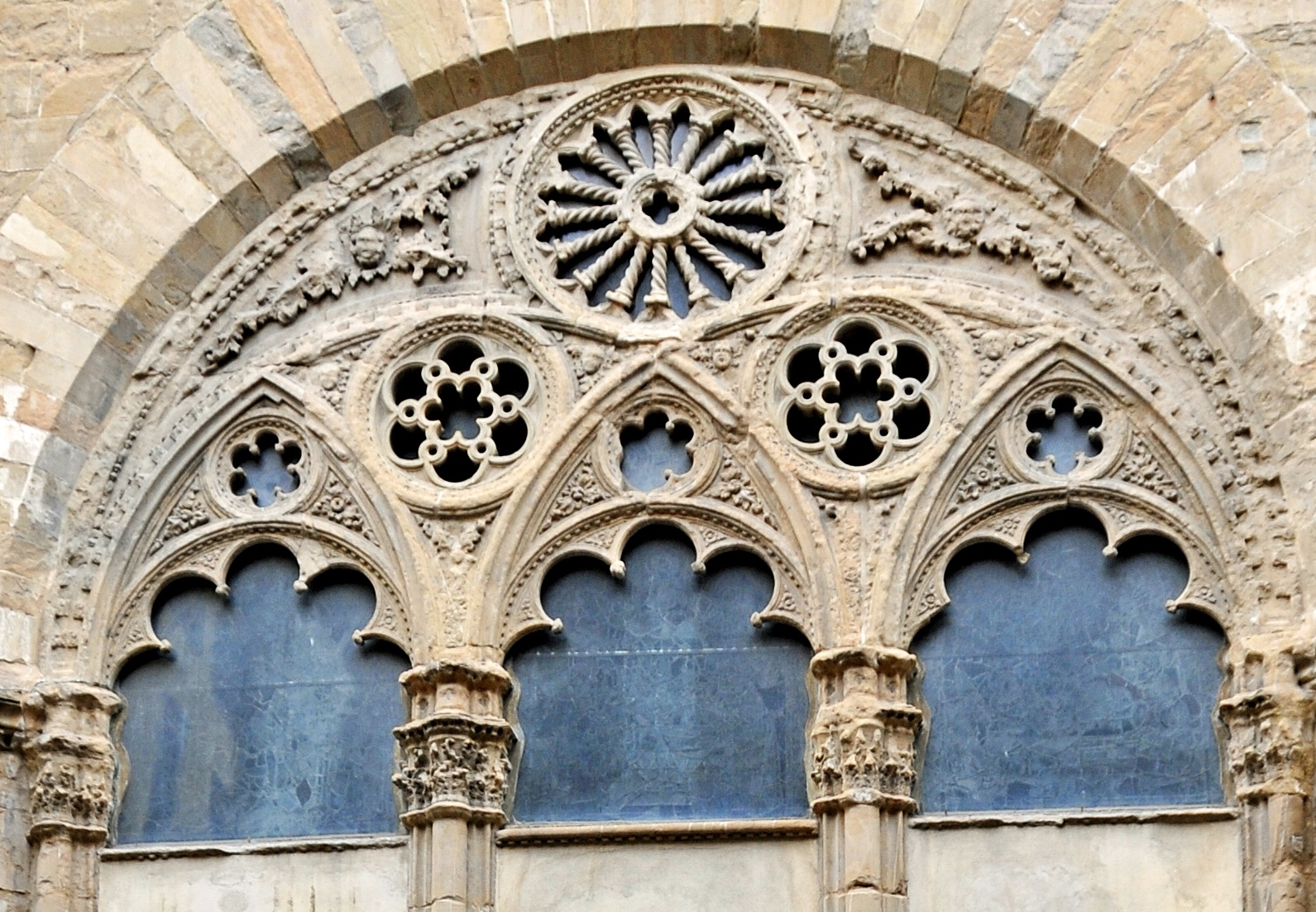
Gothic arches in a window of Orsanmichele.

== Elements of the Orient ==
Islamic fabrics

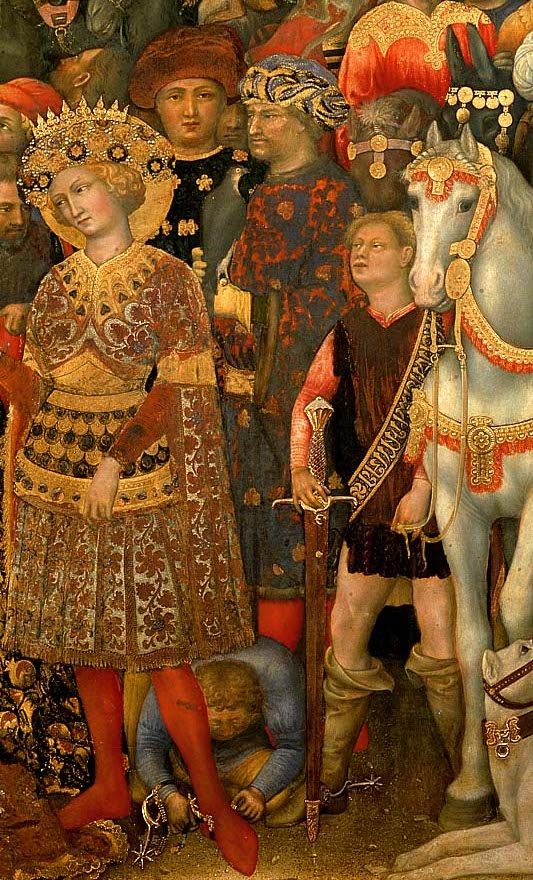
The designs of the Magi's recall Islamic luxury textiles. Men are wearing turbans.

The sumptuous clothes of the Magi recall expensive materials such as silks, velvet, brocades, and damasks draw inspiration from the luxury textiles from the Orient imported to Florence by wealthy families. The textiles are also meant to evoke the Holy Land .

They show rich patterns gold pastiglia and floral designs that include ogival and fluctuating stem patterns. The magi Caspar is shown dressed in a dark tunic contrasted against the a pattern of gold pomegranates which symbolized Jesus' death in the cross and his rebirth in Christian iconography. The dress of the other two magi, Melchior and Balthazar, also include gold, silver, and detailed floral designs. Some men in the group to the right are wearing turbans, which gives the impression of a procession of notables that have come from the Orient with the Magi.

Exotic animals

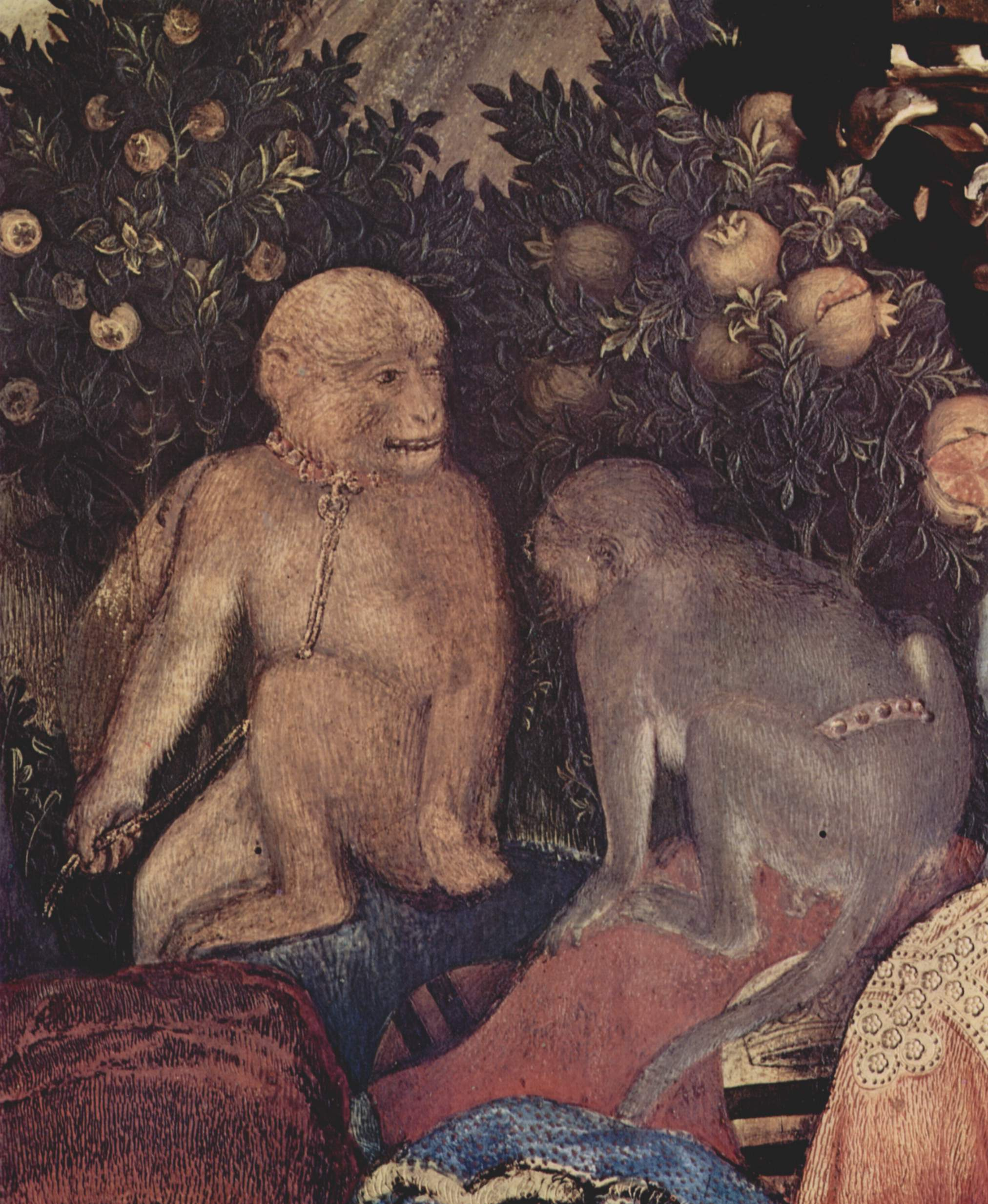
Monkeys in chains.

Exotic animals are included in the altarpiece to establish a Middle Eastern setting for the work. They were also a sign of wealth and connection. Camels were given as gifts, monkeys were collected, and lions and leopards were trained for purposes such as hunting. All of these non-European animals can be found in the painting.

Falcons are also depicted, which were linked to Persian and Arabian traditions and were used for hunting sport by the nobility. Palla Strozzi, the patron, is painted in the image holding a falcon. In addition to signify his status, it also serves as a visual pun, since the term "falconer" translates to Strozzieri in the Tuscan dialect. Another falcon in the painting is situated just below in the middle of arch and is shown flying and spreading its wings. The falcon in religious works may evoke the Holy Spirit.

Pseudo-Arabic inscriptions

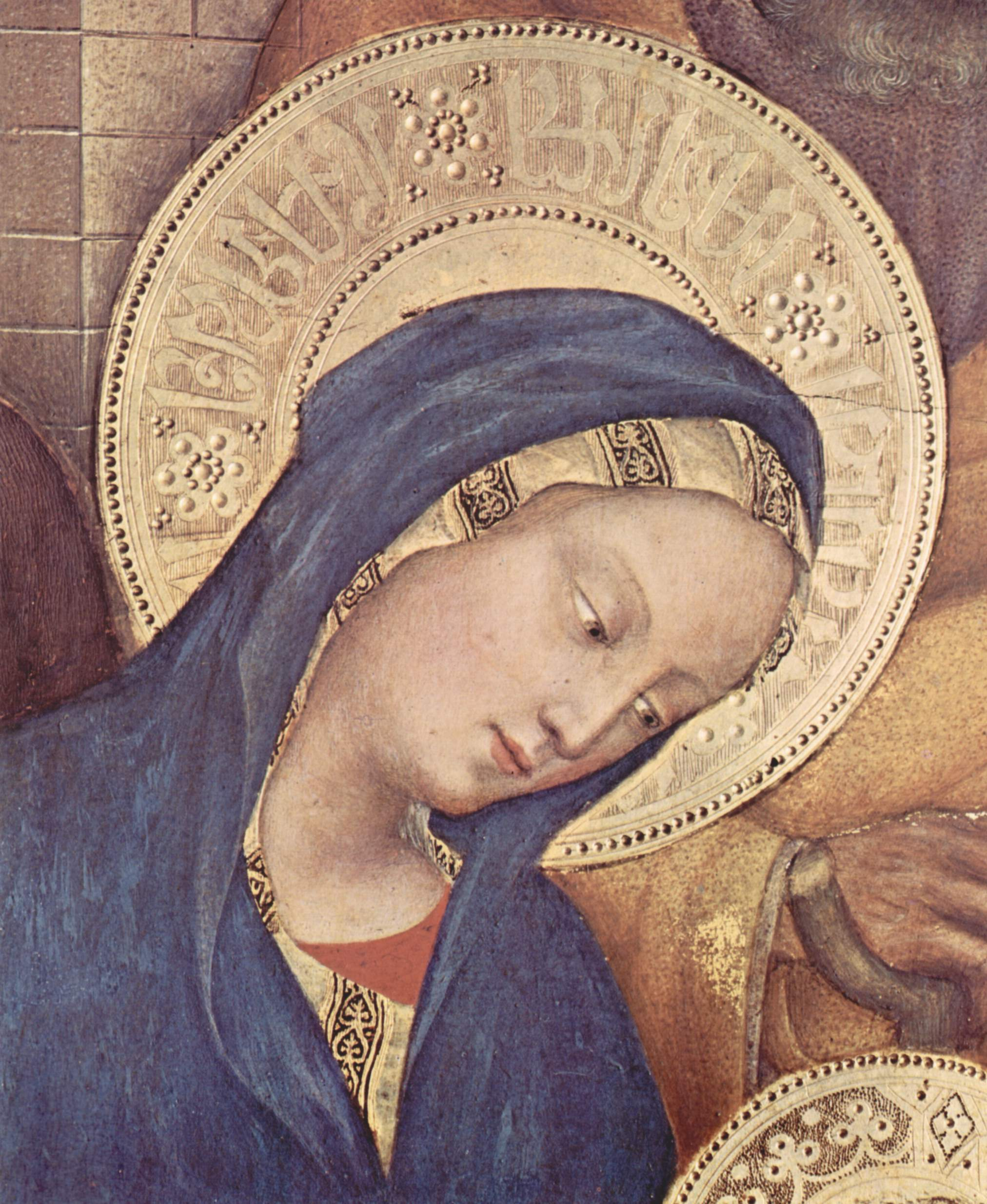
Pseudo-Arabic script in the Virgin Mary's halo

Gentile placed pseudo-Arabic gold leaf lettering in the golden halos of Mary and Joseph, thus creating a connection to the Holy Land. The script is divided by rosettes like those on Mamluk plates.

The growing trade relationships with the East, mainly the Mamluk Sultanate, brought goods such as ceramics, metalwork and textiles to Florence, which helped spread Arabic writing, much admired for its luxuriousness and exotic qualities. Gentile's pre-Florentine paintings do not include pseudo-Arabic inscriptions. Gentile da Fabriano's Florentine paintings also include pseudo-Arabic inscriptions, such as in his the Mary's halo in the Coronation of the Virgin and the Madonna and Child.
