= Madonna of the Quail =

Painting attributed to Pisanello

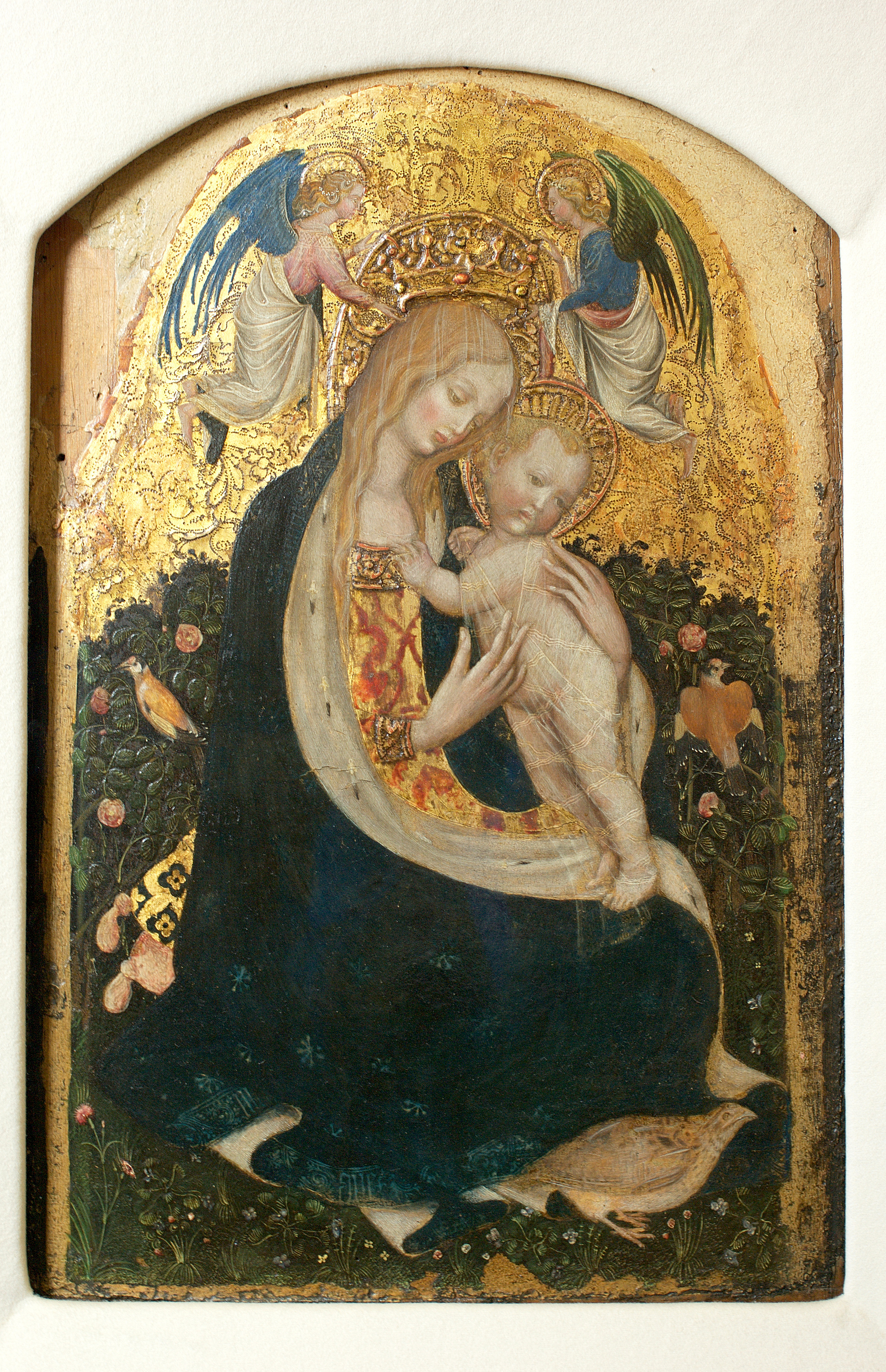
- Artist: Pisanello
- Year: c. 1420
- Medium: Tempera on panel
- Dimensions: 50 cm × 33 cm (20 in × 13 in)
- Location: Castelvecchio Museum, Verona

The Madonna of the Quail (Italian: Madonna della Quaglia) is an International Gothic painting generally attributed to Pisanello. Dating to c. 1420, it was housed in the Castelvecchio Museum of Verona, northern Italy until stolen in 2015. It was recovered in 2016.

== Description ==
The painting depicts the Madonna with Child crowned by two flying angels, sitting inside a rose garden in typical late Gothic style. The painter put a great attention in the representation of vegetables and birds, including the quail in the foreground, which gives its name to the painting. The heavenly appearance of the scene is enhanced by the gilt background.

The rendering of the Madonna and her clothes resemble those of the works by Gentile da Fabriano, whose workshop Pisanello was a member of at the time. The setting is also similar to the contemporary Madonna of the Rose Garden by Michelino da Besozzo or Stefano da Verona, also in the museum of Castelvecchio.

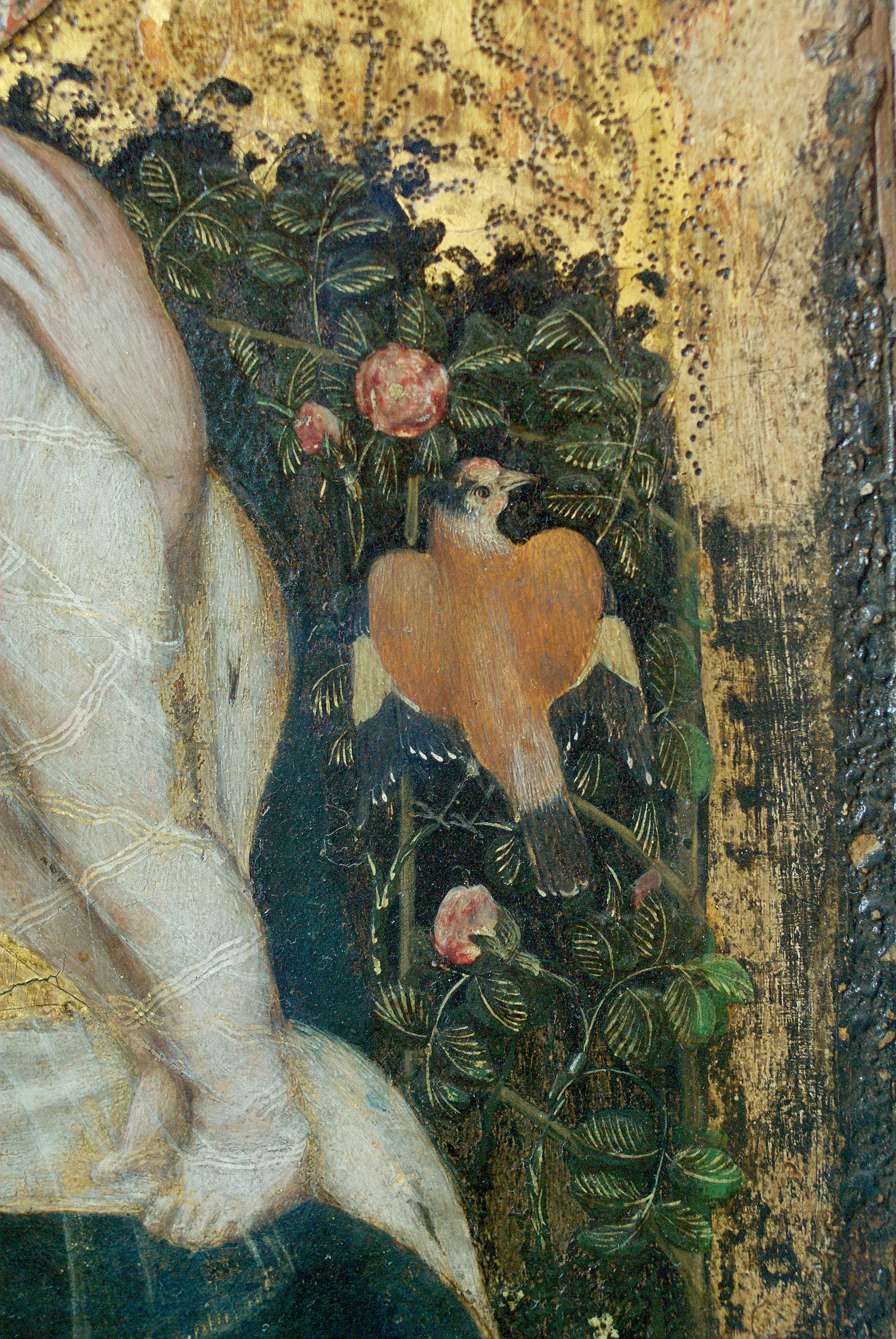

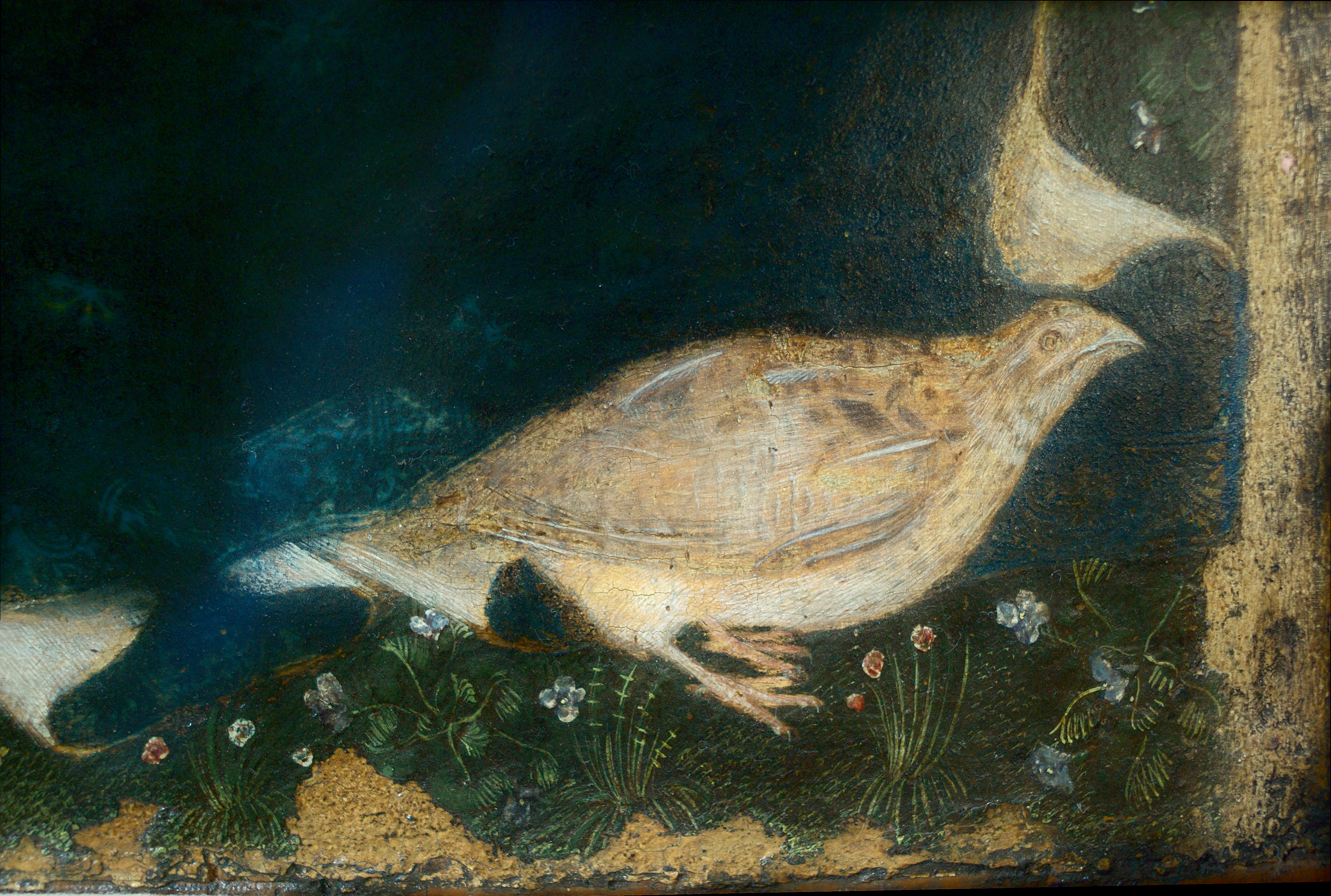

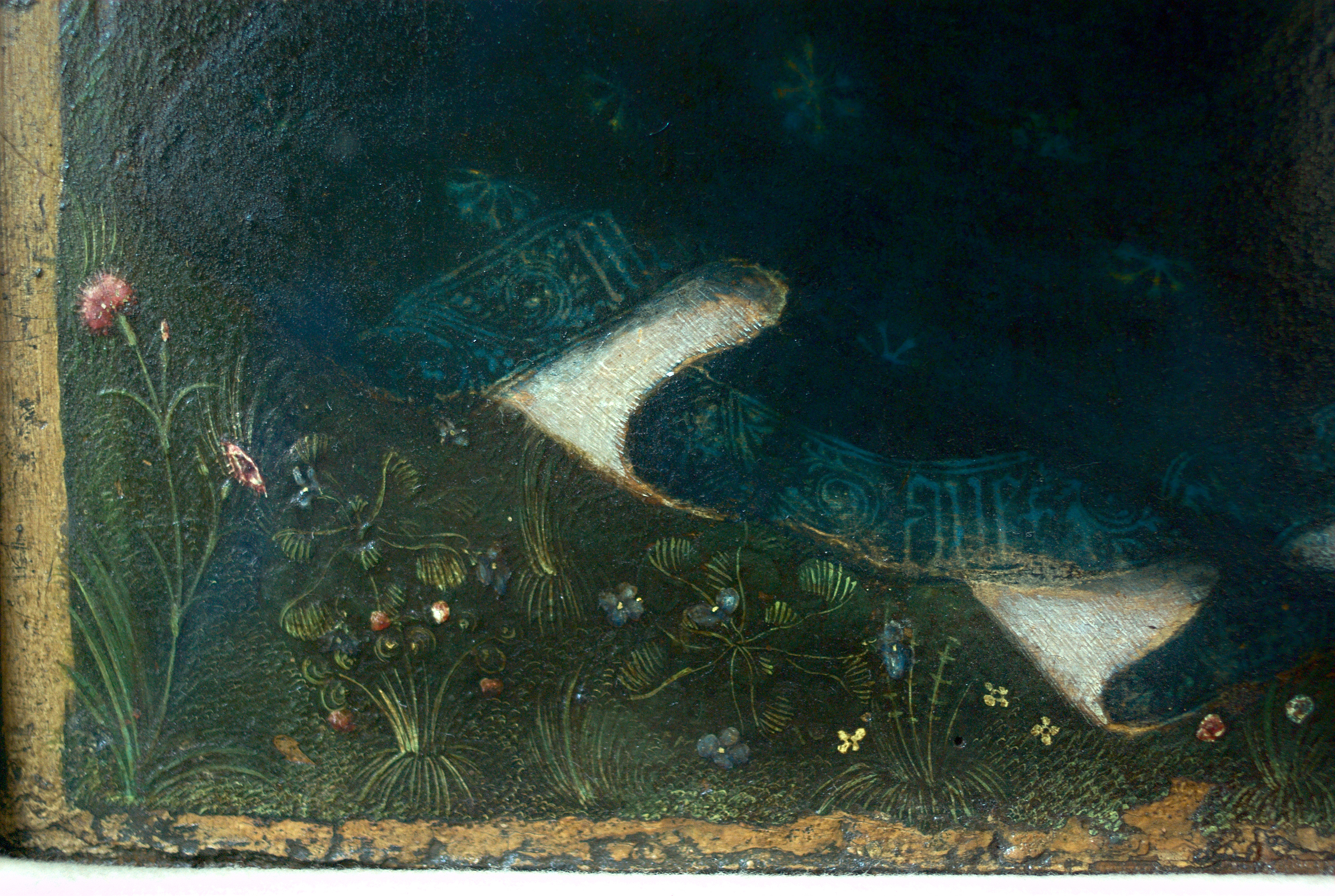

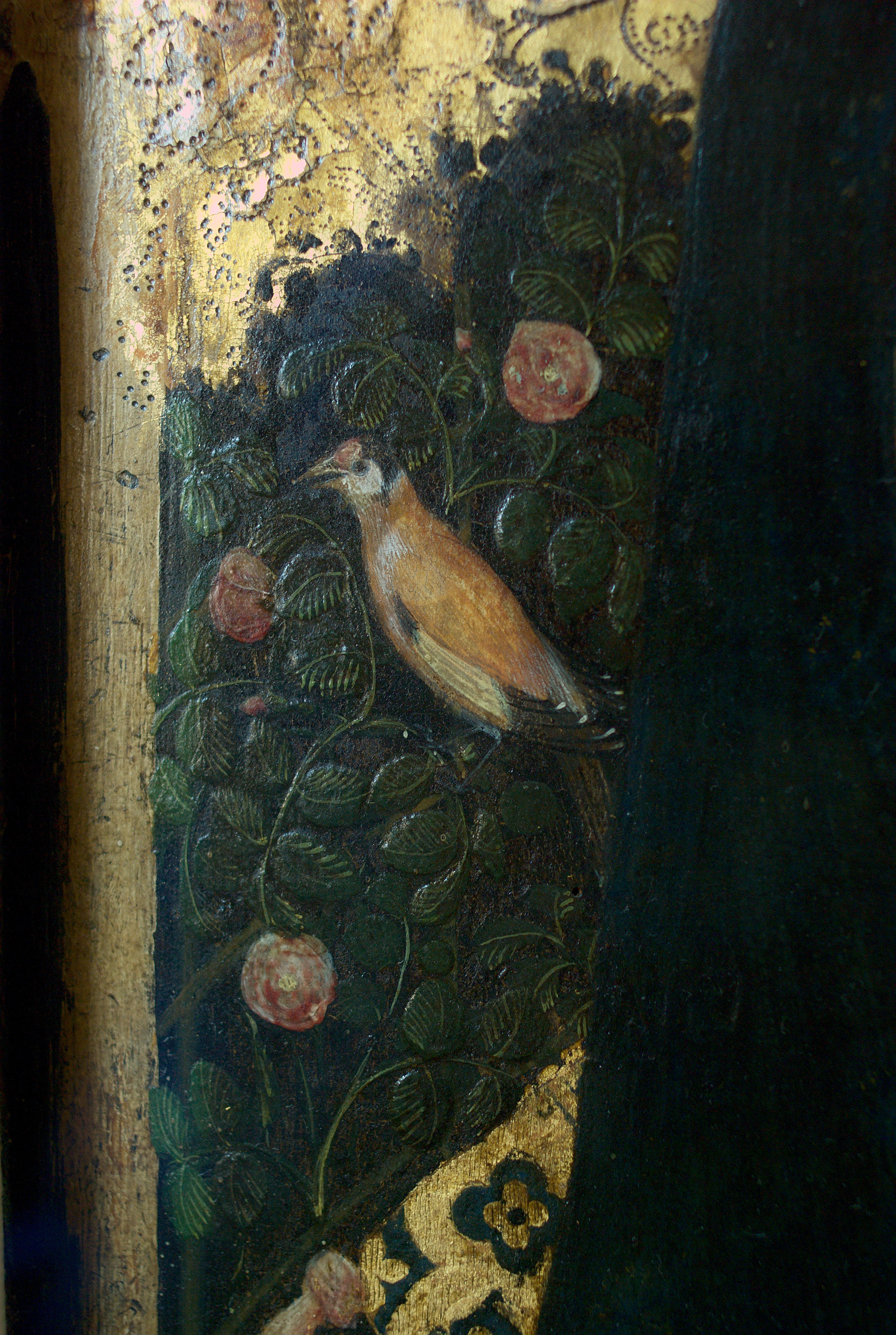

== Sources ==
- Zuffi, Stefano (2004). Il Quattrocento. Milan: Electa.
