= Castelvecchio Museum =

Museum in Verona, Italy

Coordinates: 45°26′24″N 10°59′16″E

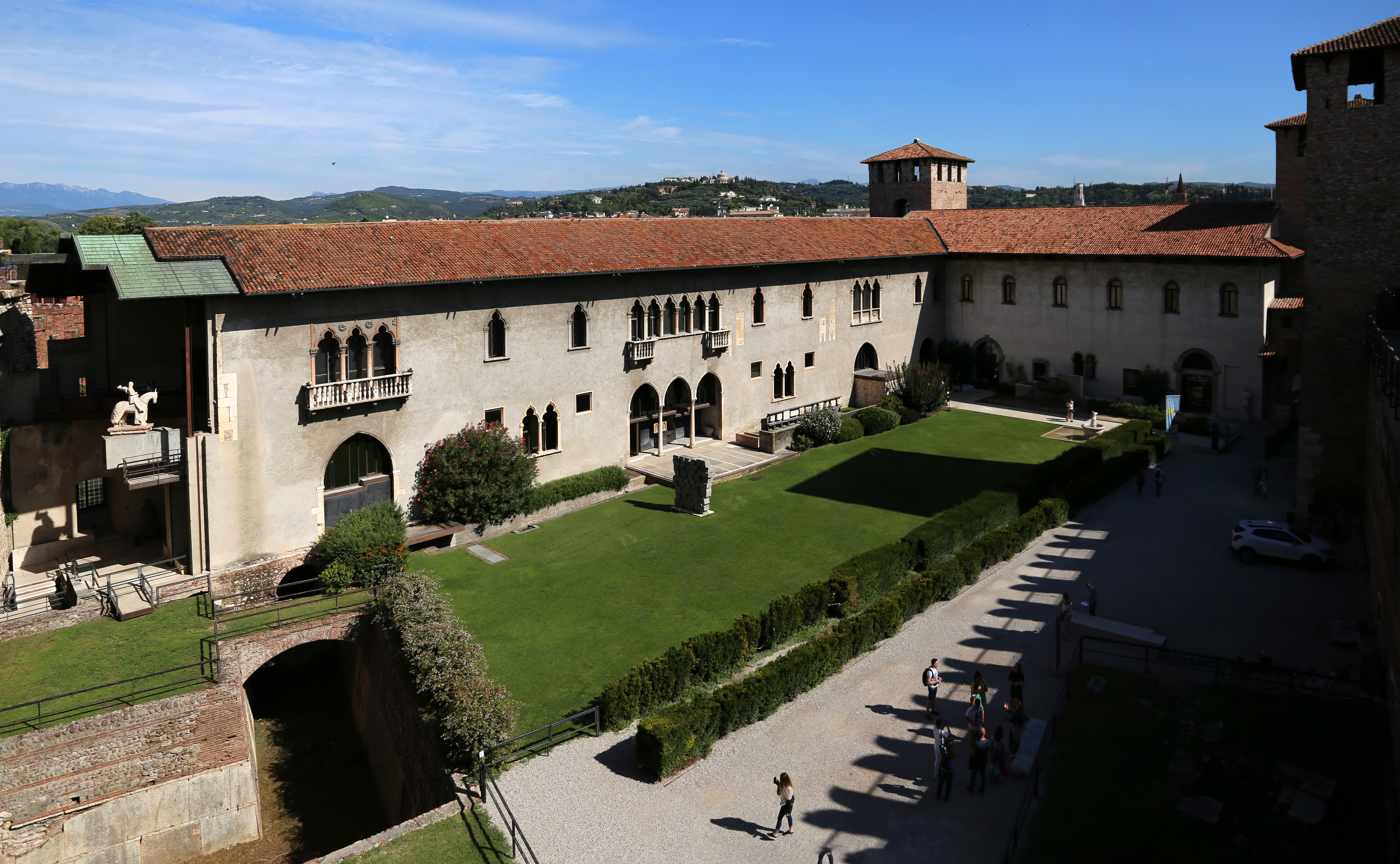
Castelvecchio Museum

Castelvecchio Museum (Italian: Museo Civico di Castelvecchio) is a museum in Verona, northern Italy, located in the eponymous medieval castle. Restoration by the architect Carlo Scarpa between 1959 and 1973 has enhanced the appearance of the building and exhibits. Scarpa's architectural style is visible in the details for doorways, staircases, furnishings, and even fixtures designed to hold a specific piece of artwork. The renovation carefully balanced new and old, revealing the history of the original building where appropriate. Unusual at the time, this approach has now become a common approach to renovation.

== Collection ==
The museum displays a collection of sculpture, statues, paintings, ancient weapons, ceramics, gold works, miniatures and some old bells.

Sculptures, mostly from the Romanesque period of Verona, include:

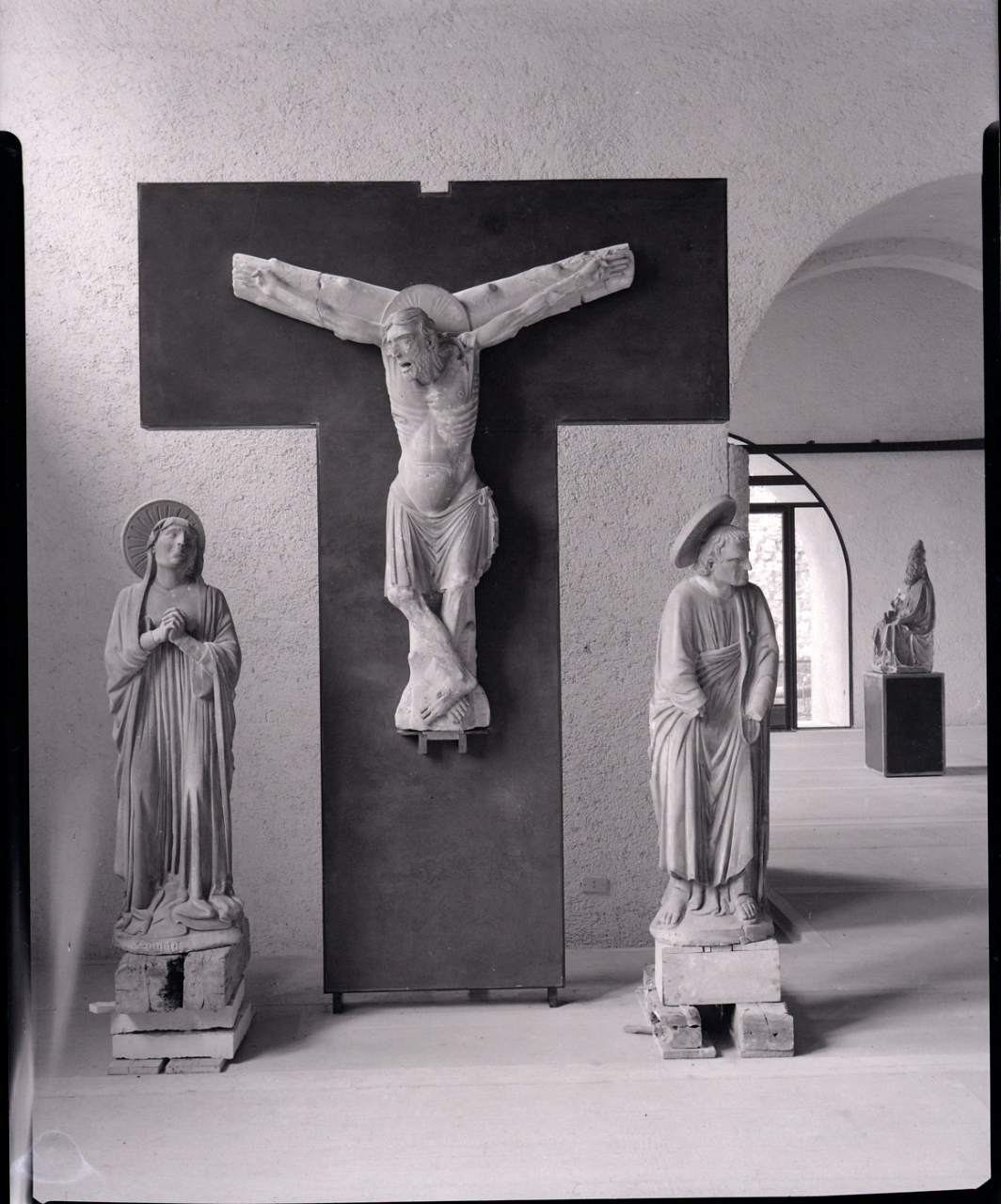
"The Crucifix and the Weepers". Photo by Paolo Monti, 1961 (Fondo Paolo Monti, BEIC).

- Sepulchre of the Sts. Sergius and Bacchus, basrelief from 1179.
- "Crucifix", a 14th-century tuff work by the so-called Master of Sant'Anastasia, from the church of San Giacomo in Tomba.
- "St. Cecilia and Catherina", from the same Master of St. Anastasia.
- Equestrian statue of Cangrande I della Scala, coming from complex of the Scaliger Tombs.

Paintings include:

- Madonna of the Quail by Pisanello
- Madonna of the Rose Garden by Stefano da Verona or Michelino da Besozzo
- Crucifixion and Madonna dell'Umiltà by Jacopo Bellini
- Madonna with Child by Gentile Bellini
- Madonna of the Oak by Girolamo dai Libri
- Holy Family by Andrea Mantegna

There are also numerous paintings and frescoes from the 14th century.

== 2015 Theft and Recovery ==
In November 2015, seventeen Old Master paintings, including works by Rubens, Tintoretto and Mantegna, were stolen in an armed robbery. Ukrainian border guards recovered all of the works in May 2016 near Odesa; they were returned to Verona in December 2016.

== Gallery ==
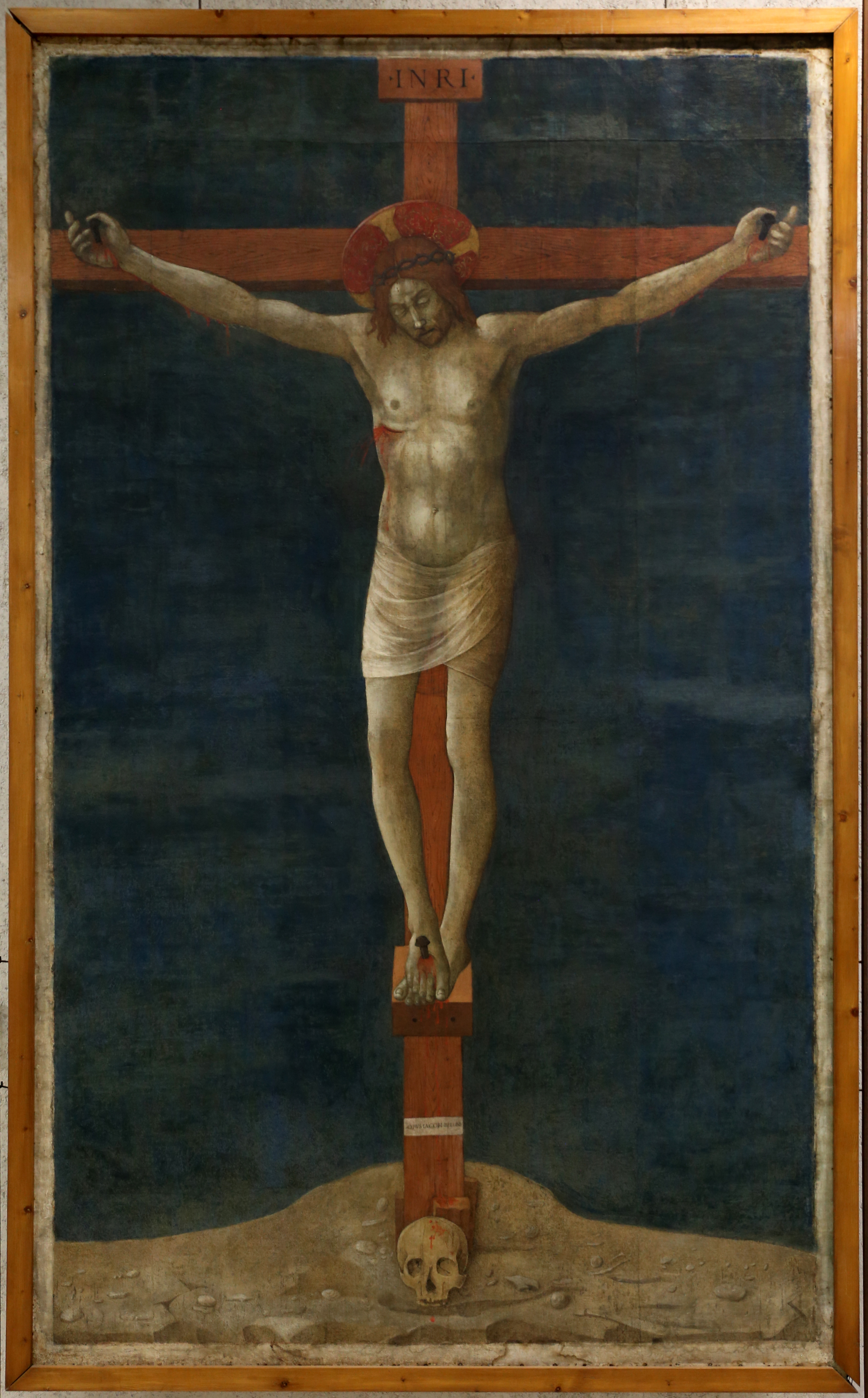
Crucifixion by Jacopo Bellini

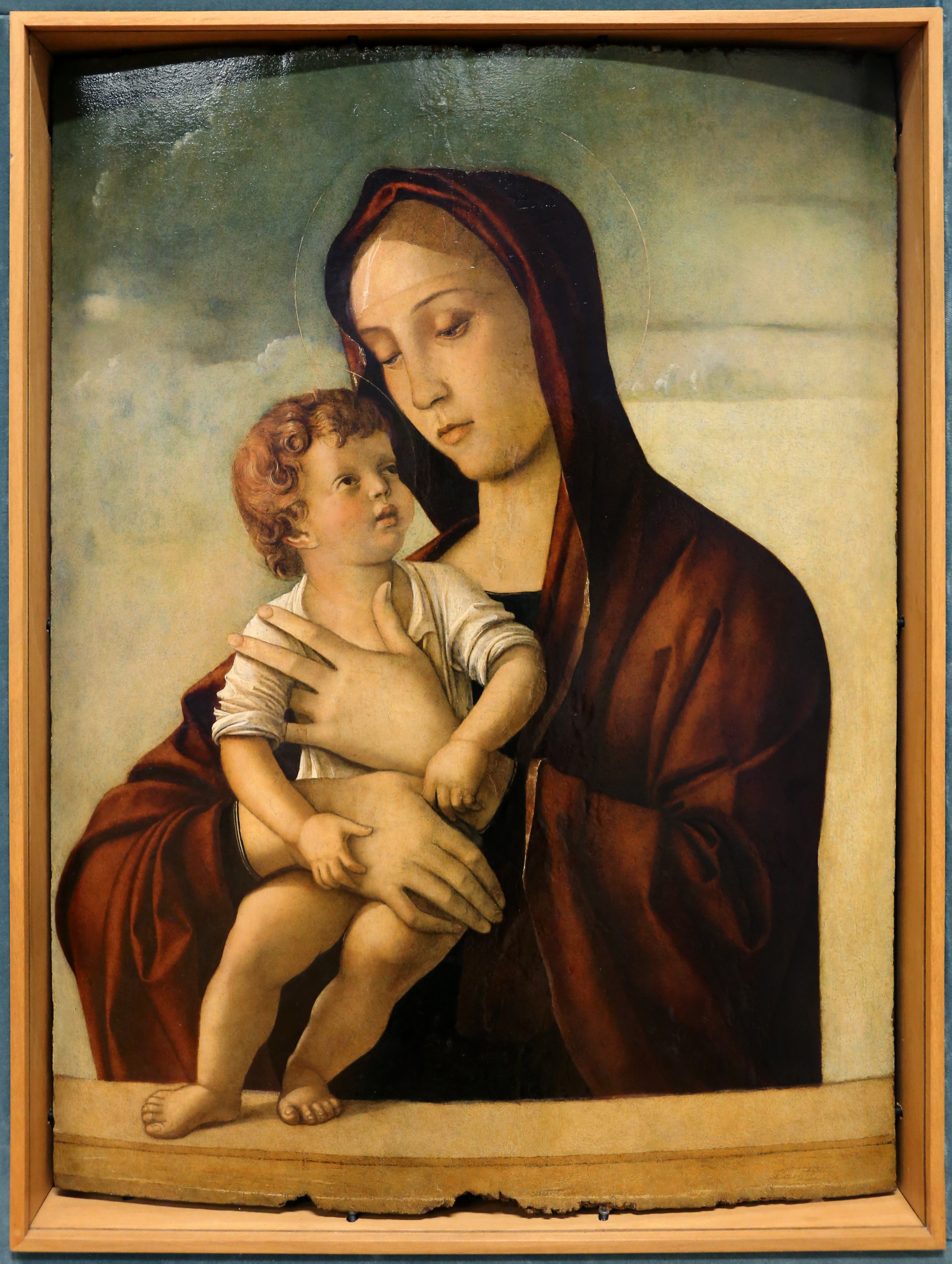
Madonna with Child by Bellini

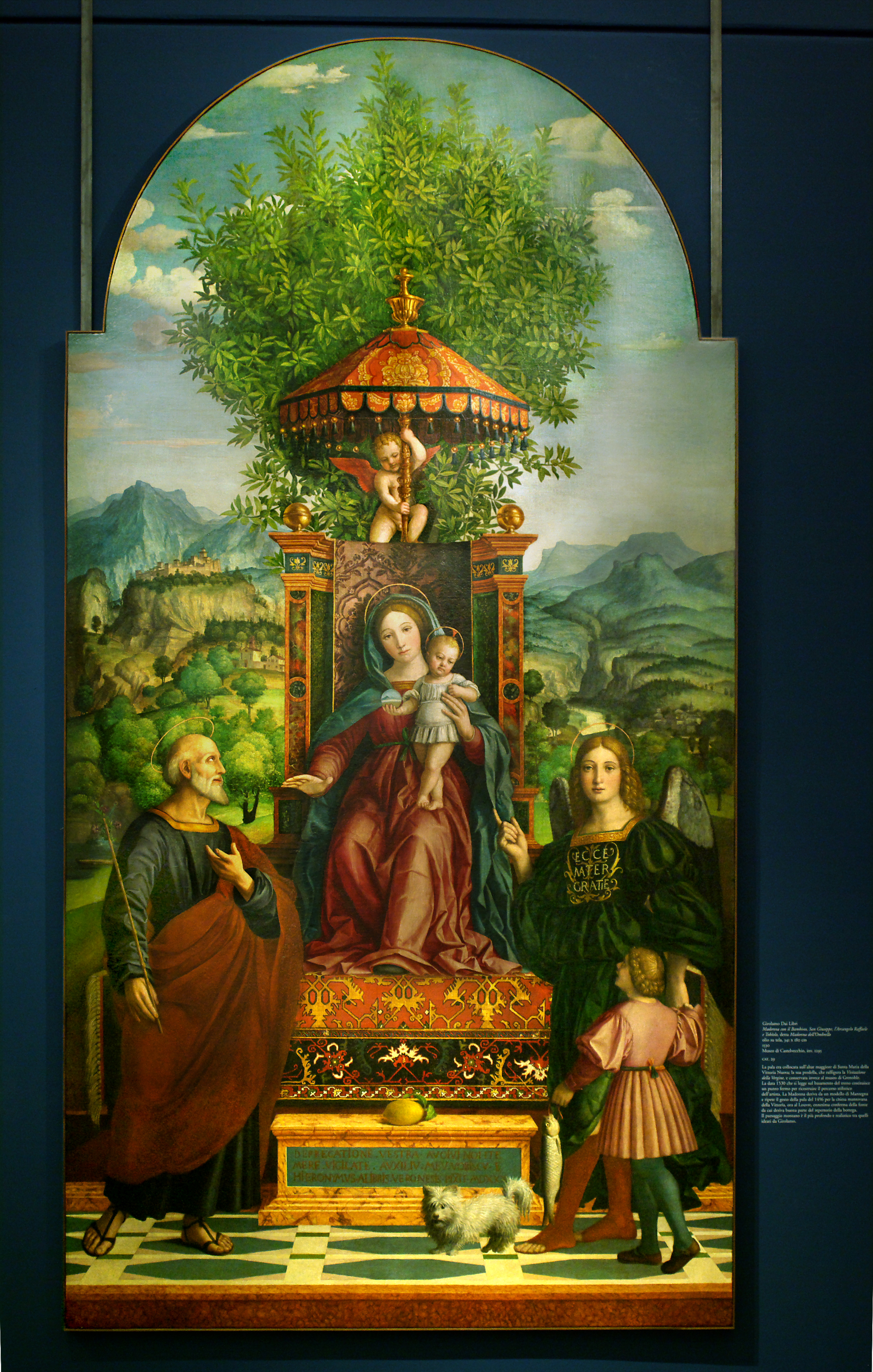
Madonna dell'Ombrello, by Girolamo dai Libri, 1530, Museo di Castelvecchio, Verona

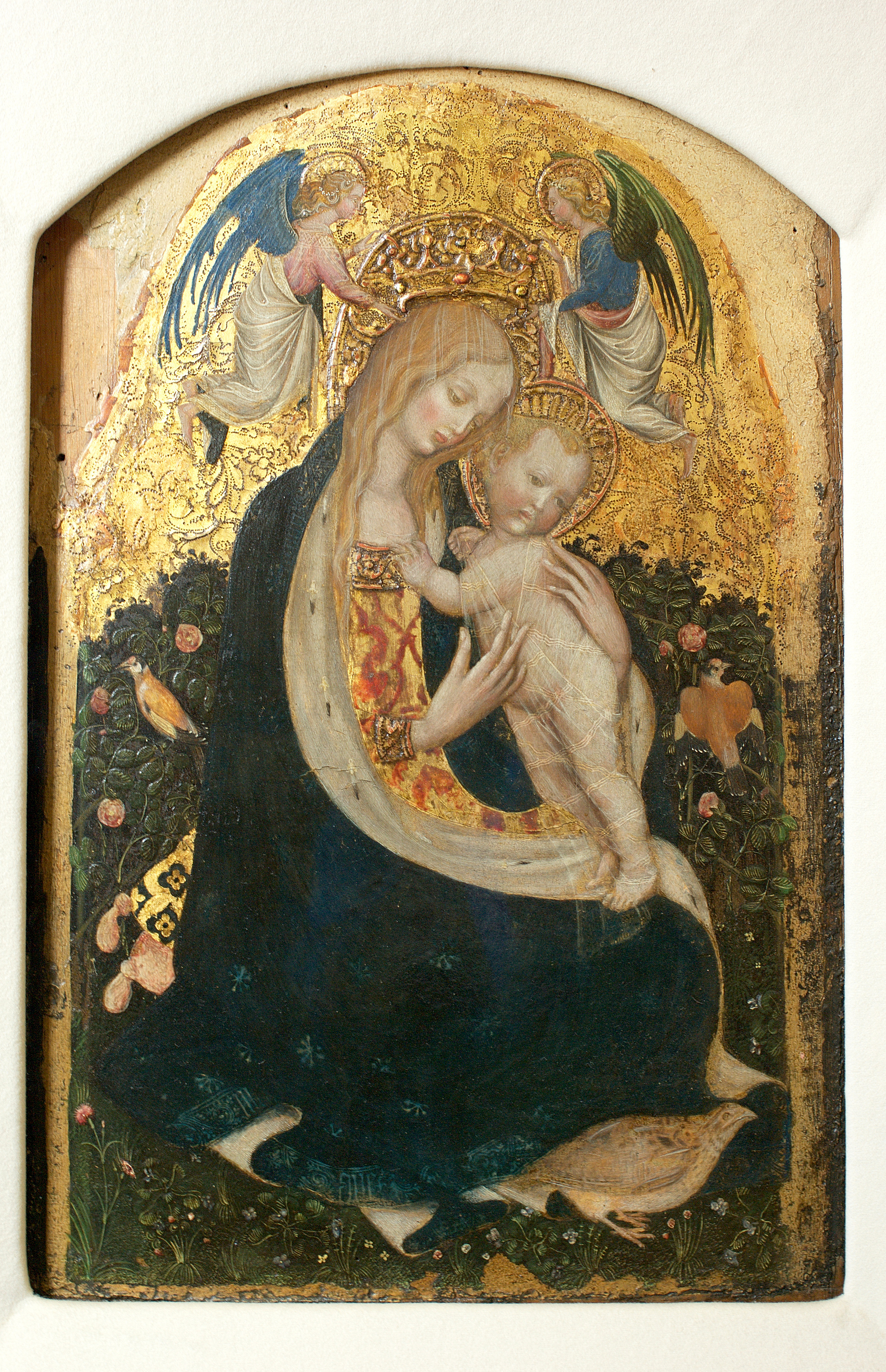
Madonna of the Quail by Pisanello, stolen 2015, now recovered

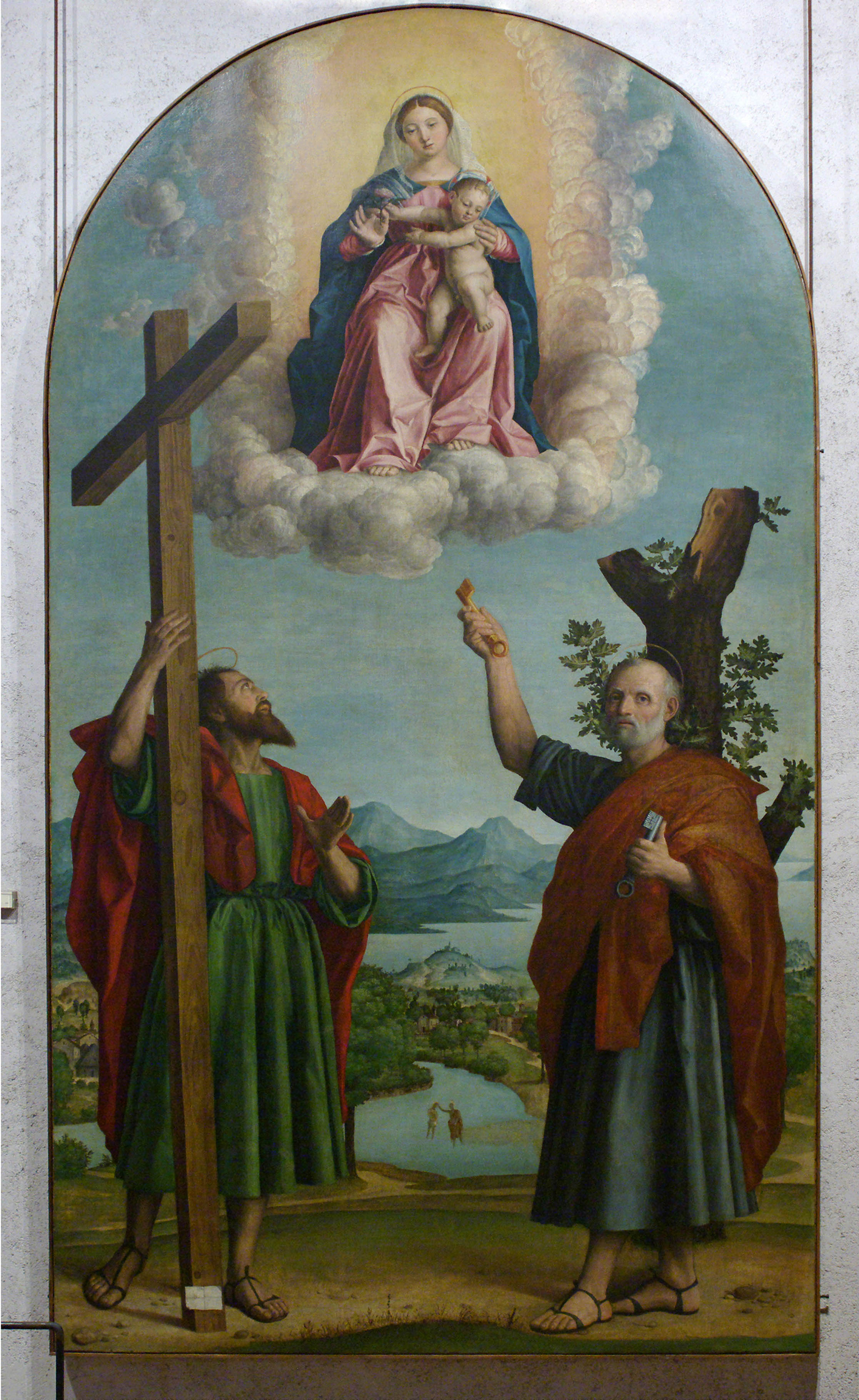
Madonna of the Oak, by Girolamo dai Libri, Castelvecchio Museum, Verona (Italy).

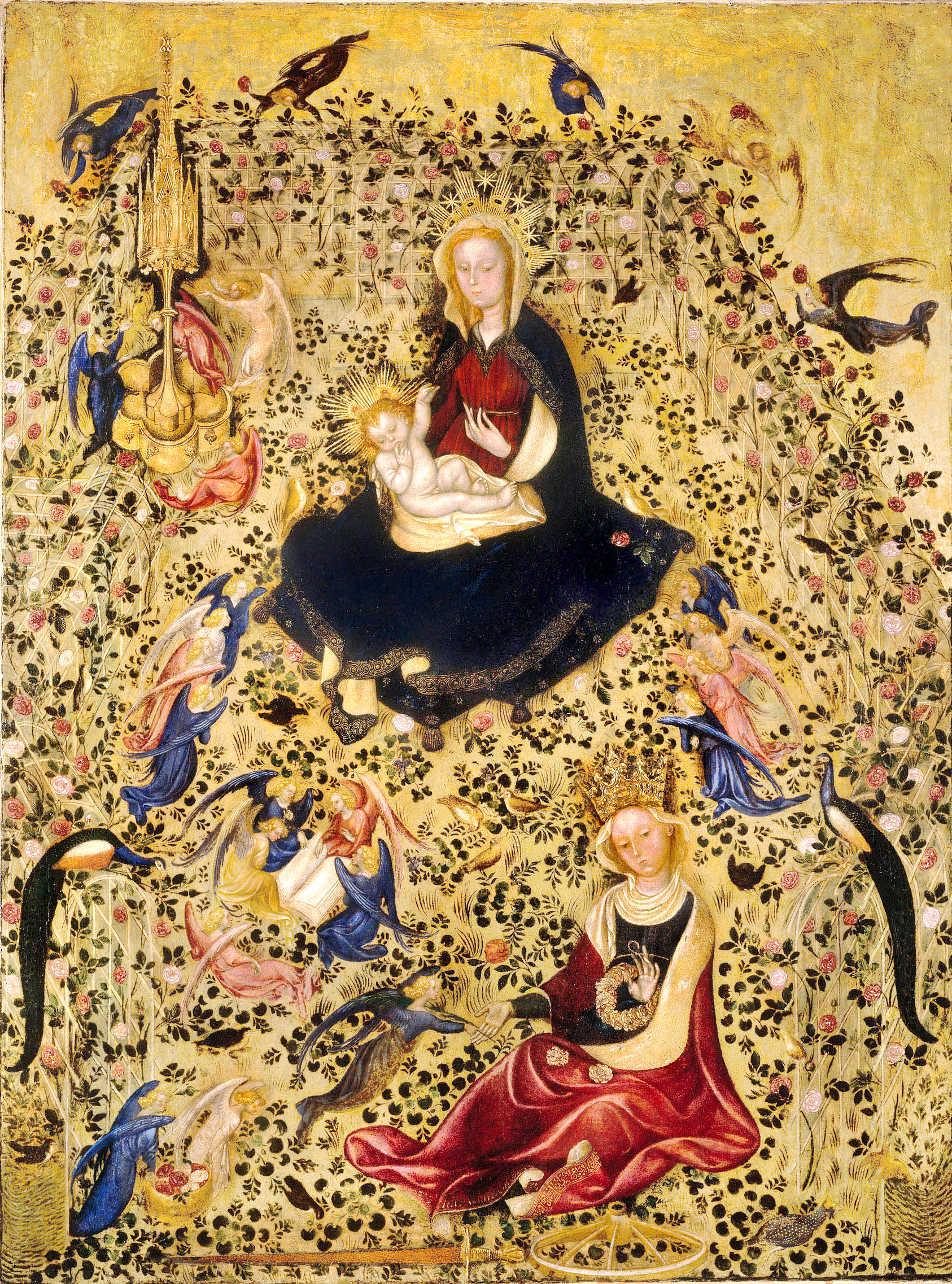
Madonna of the Rose Garden by Stefano da Verona or Michelino da Besozzo

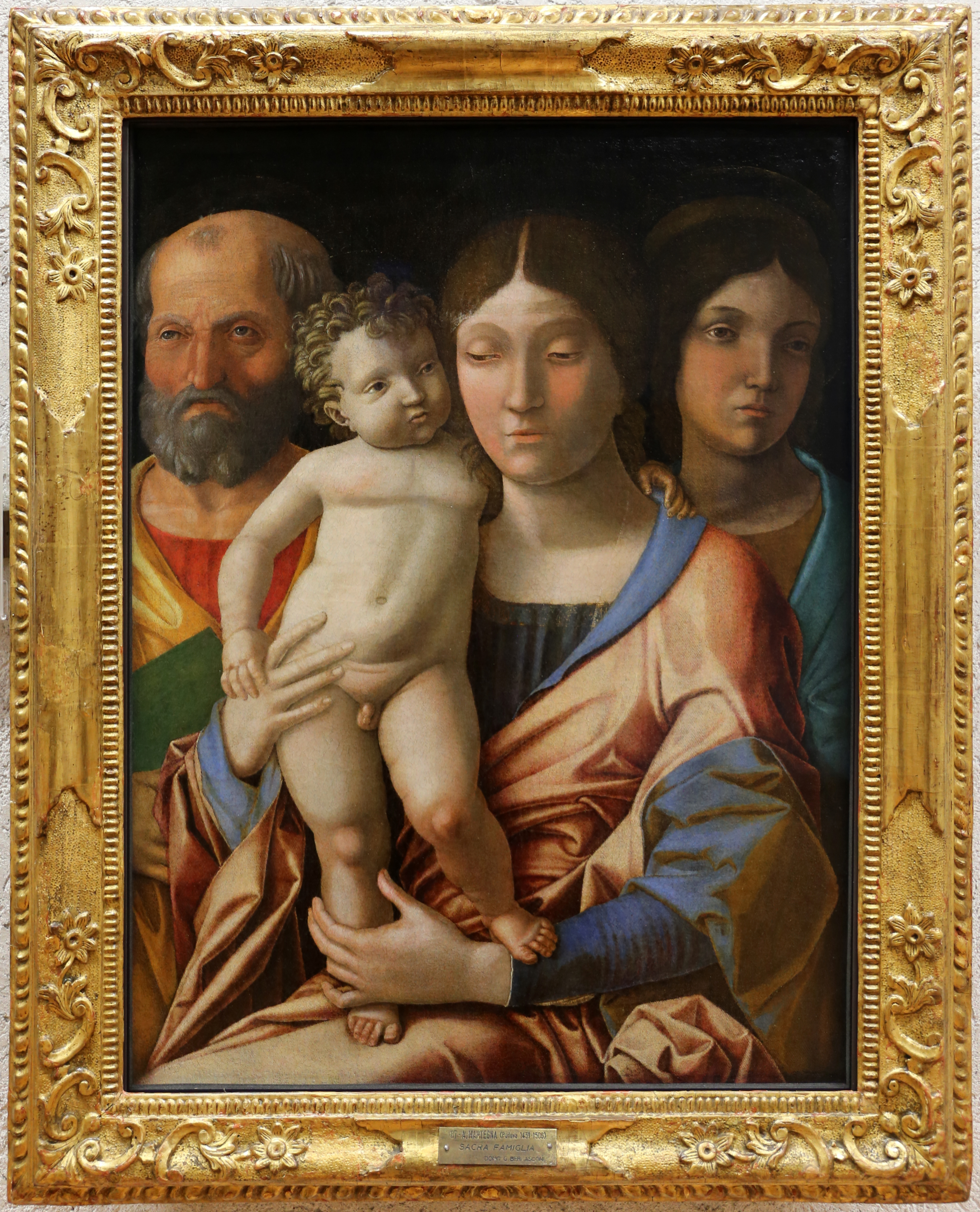
Holy Family by Andrea Mantegna

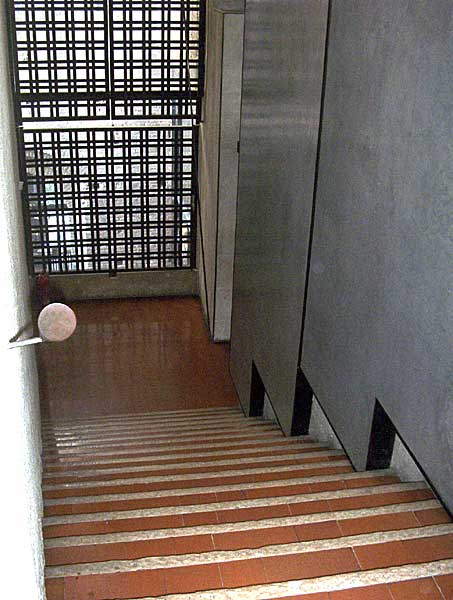
Staircase designed by Carlo Scarpa, at Castelvecchio Museum in Verona. Italy

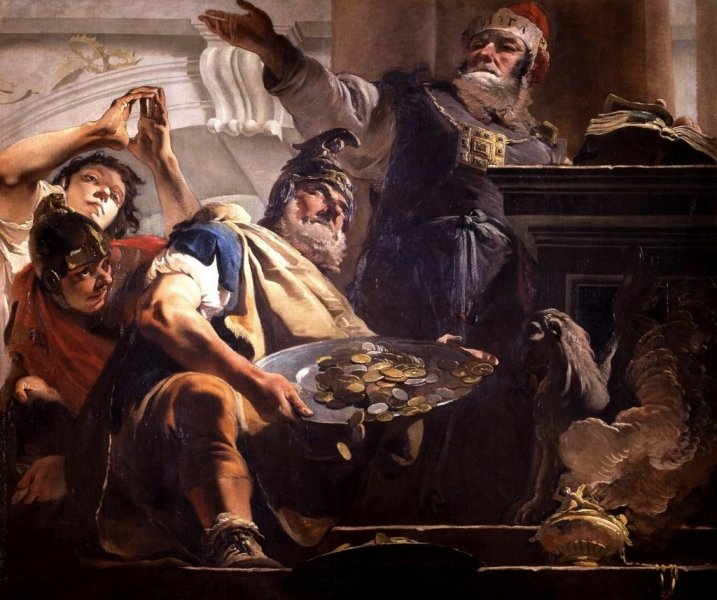
Heliodorus plunders the temple by Giovanni Battista Tiepolo

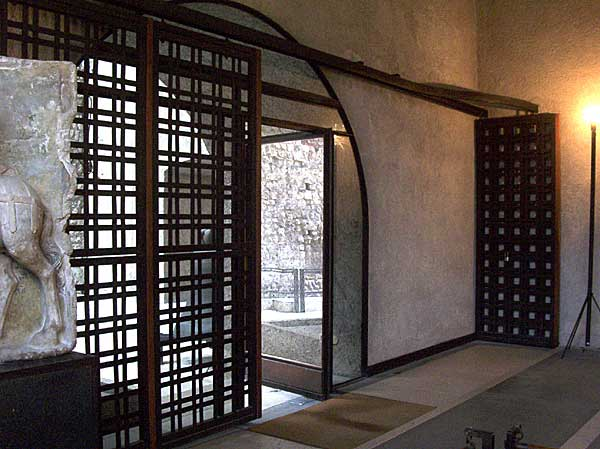
Ornate metal lattice door designed by Carlo Scarpa

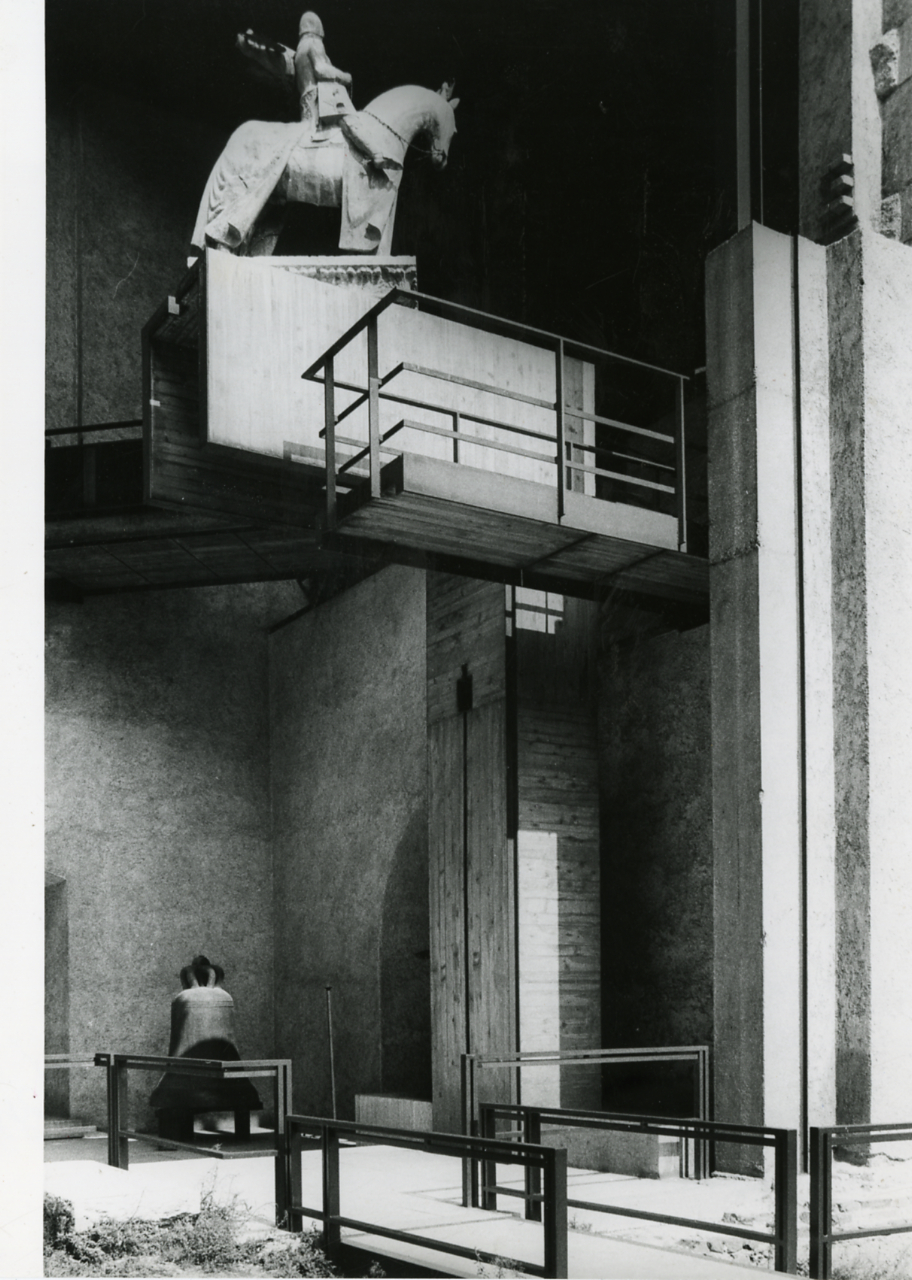
Scarpa used modern materials to create a platform for artwork. Photo by Paolo Monti, 1982 (Fondo Paolo Monti, BEIC).

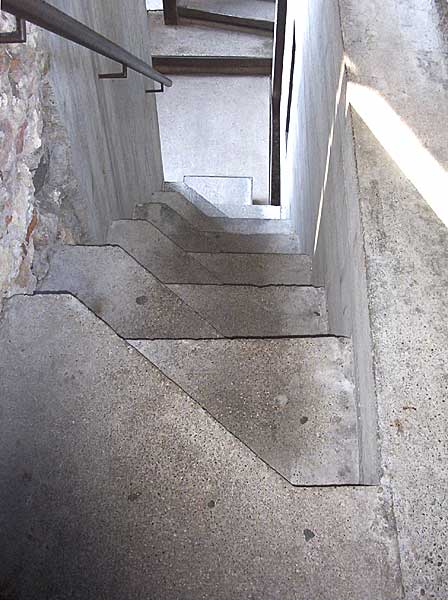
Weathered staircase in the Castelvecchio Museum — Verona, Italy

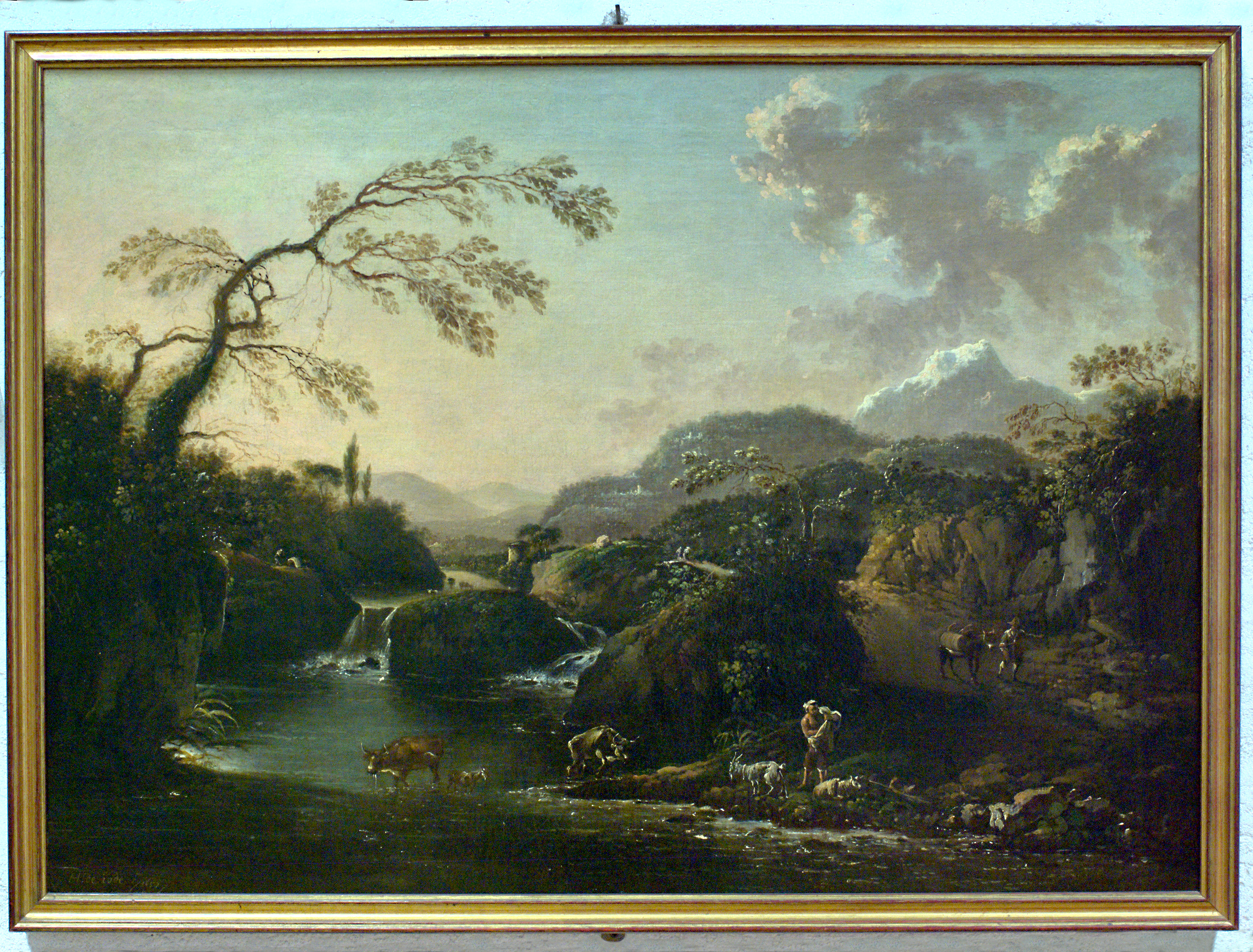
Hans de Jode 1657 - Landscape with waterfall - Castelvecchio Verona, stolen 2015

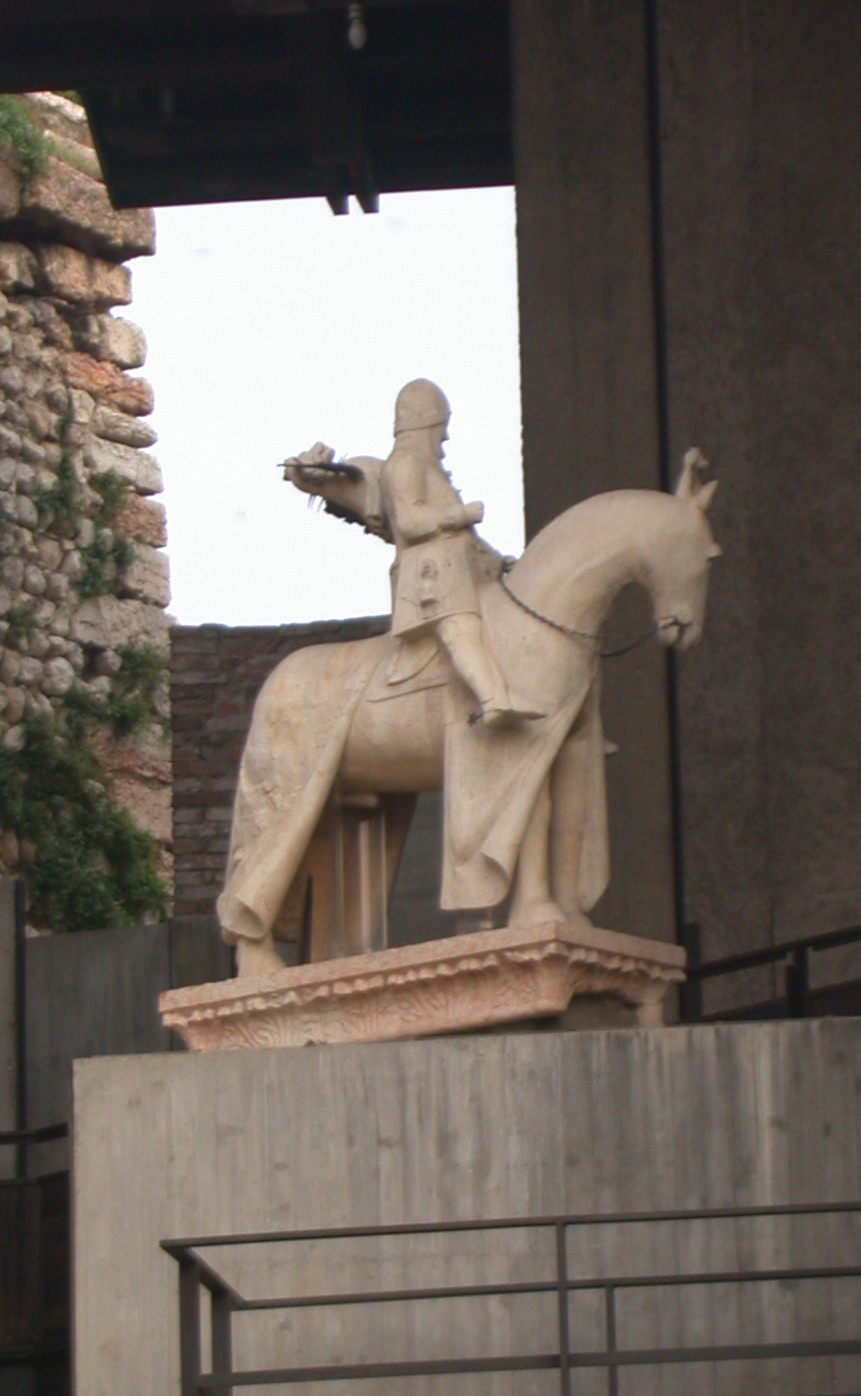
Equestrian statue of Cangrande I della Scala
