= Vincenzo di Stefano da Verona =

Italian painter

Vincenzo di Stefano da Verona (also called Vincenzo da Verona) was an Italian painter of the early-Renaissance. He was probably the son of Stefano da Verona, flourished in the second half of the 15th century, and is the reputed master of Liberale da Verona. A fresco at Verona is attributed to him. It forms part of the decoration on the monument erected in 1432 at Sant' Anastasia to the memory of Cortesía Serego, the general Antonio Scaliger.
