= Madonna of the Rose Garden =

Madonna of the Rose Garden may refer to:

- Madonna of the Rose Garden (Verona), a c. 1420–1435 painting now in Verona, Italy
- Madonna of the Rose Bower (Lochner), a c. 1440 painting by Stefan Lochner
- Madonna of the Rose Bower (Schongauer), a 1473 painting by Martin Schongauer
- Madonna of the Rose Garden (Botticelli), a c. 1469–70 painting by Sandro Botticelli
- Madonna of the Rose Garden (Luini), a c. 1510 painting by Bernardino Luini
