= Madonna of the Rose Garden (Luini) =

Painting by Bernardino Luini

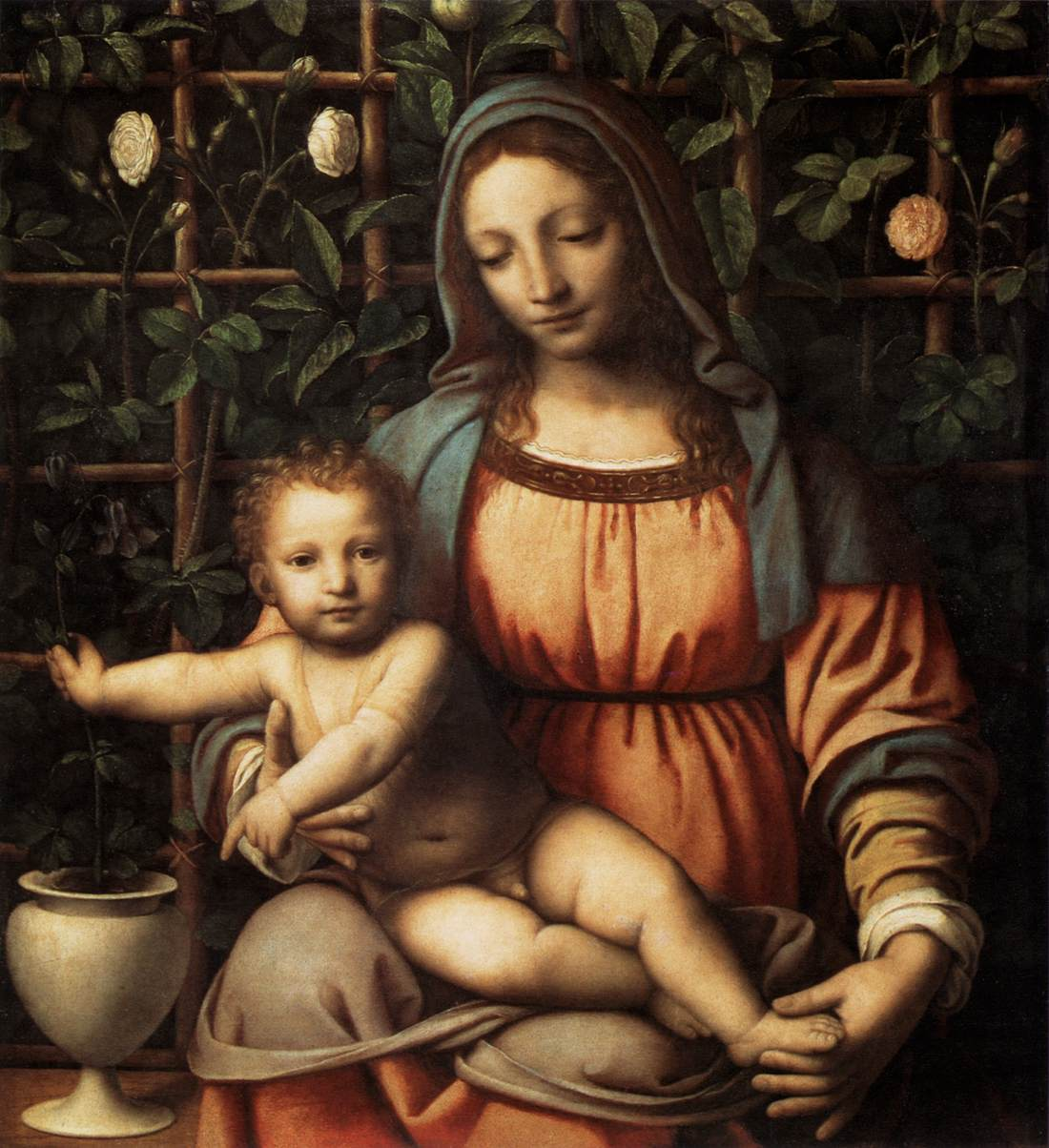
- Artist: Bernardino Luini
- Year: c. 1510
- Medium: Oil on panel
- Dimensions: 70 cm × 63 cm (28 in × 25 in)
- Location: Pinacoteca di Brera, Milan

Madonna of the Rose Garden (Italian: Madonna del Roseto) is an oil painting on panel of c. 1510 by the Italian Renaissance artist Bernardino Luini. It is in the Pinacoteca di Brera in Milan, which acquired it from the Giuseppe Bianchi collection in 1826.

A masterpiece of the artist's youth, it is traditionally thought to have been commissioned by the Certosa di Pavia, though no documents survive to support or deny this.

== Description and analysis ==
The Madonna is depicted at half-length, seated with the Child in her arms, in front of a background of white roses: this is the typical Marian flower, whose iconographic relation to the Virgin was in use throughout the Middle Ages. The attention devoted to the description of plants is linked to Lombard naturalism, whose origins can be found in the late Gothic art.

The background is dark and even, so that the soft, subdued lighting stands out. In fact, the face of the Madonna shows the unmistakable influence of Leonardo da Vinci, with a sweet nuance. Even the Child is inspired by Leonardo's works, but none in particular (or perhaps the never painted Madonna of the Cat): the artist used a certain freedom in reworking its shape, arranging it diagonally, as if to compose an ideal arc that reconnects it to the figure of the mother within an oval. The Christ Child points to a vase with his left hand, referring to his mother as the mystic vase, and with his right hand holds the stem of the aquilegia growing in it, its reddish colour referring to his own Passion.

== See also ==
- Madonna of the Rose Garden (disambiguation)
