= Adoration of the Magi (Stefano da Verona) =

Gothic painting by Stefano da Verona

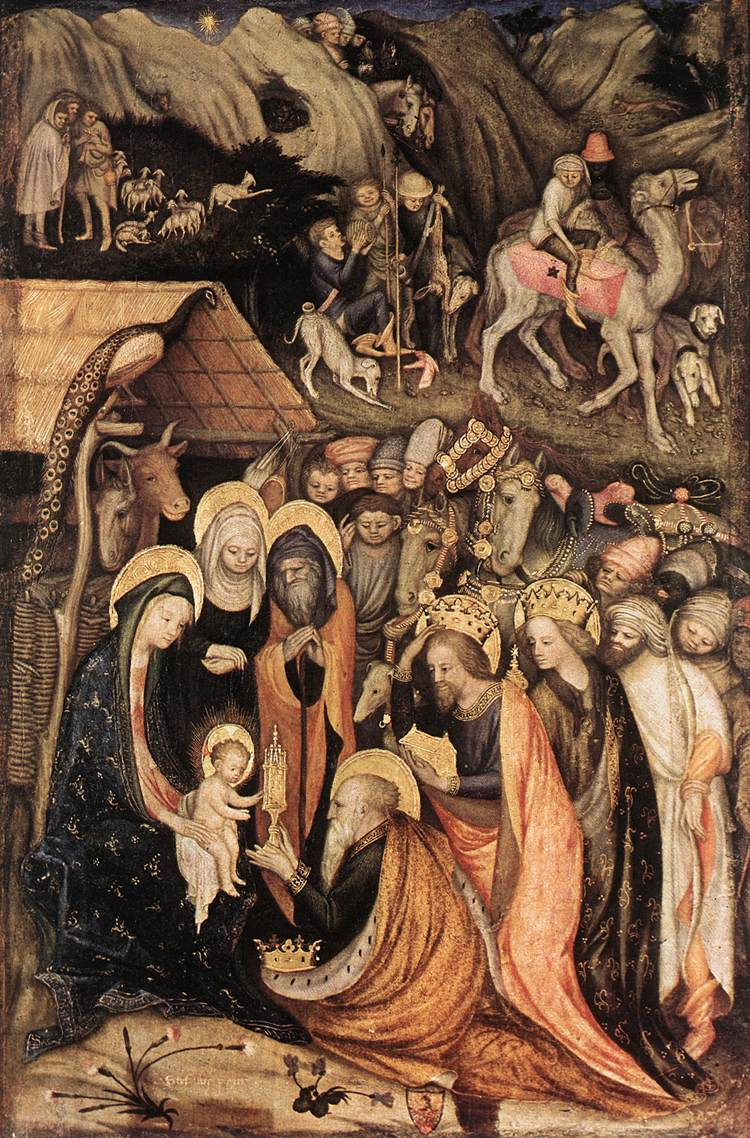
- Artist: Stefano da Verona
- Year: 1434
- Medium: Tempera on panel
- Dimensions: 72 cm × 47 cm (28 in × 19 in)
- Location: Pinacoteca di Brera, Milan

The Adoration of the Magi is a Gothic painting by Stefano da Verona. Dating to 1434, it is now in the Pinacoteca di Brera of Milan, northern Italy.

The work is signed Stefanus in golden letters at the bottom center, and dated, although the reading of this has been disputed by several scholars. It is however mentioned by Vasari in his Lives, and was anyway painted by the artist between his return to Verona (1425) and his death (1438). In the 19th century, it was owned by the Ottolini family of Verona, who ceded it to Domenico Biasoli. The latter sold it in 1818 to the Pinacoteca di Brera, as a work by Stefano Fiorentino.

== Description ==
The scene, some details of which come from the Adoration of the Magi by Gentile da Fabriano (1423) or a common model, is on two levels. The lower one shows the Magi and their procession homaging the Child and the Virgin; the upper one has several scenes with groups of shepherds, the arrival of the Magi led by the comet star, and the final part of the procession with dogs and camels.

The foreground depicts the Virgin who sits under the hut with the ox and the donkey, holding the Child on her knees. The three Magi have different stances: the eldest has removed is crown and is kneeling; he is donating an elaborated golden object to the Child, who stretches his hands to accept it and bless him. The mature Magus is portrayed while putting down his crown and a gilt casket in the left hand; the youngest is observing the scene from behind. The two characters with halos, in the first row behind the Child, are St. Joseph and St. Anne. The servants of the Magi include numerous races, from the Mongols to the Moors.

The rich harnesses and the fanciful hats of the members of the procession resemble similar elements work by Pisanello, who was a friend of Stefano da Verona, and is thus inspired by the dresses of the Byzantine court at the Council of Basel in 1431. The peacock on the hut's top is an early Christian symbol of resurrection and immortality, as, since Roman times, his flesh was deemed not to be prone to rotting. The violet symbolizes Christ's humility, the red carnation the Passion.
