= Madonna of the Rose Garden (Verona) =

Painting by Michelino da Besozzo or Stefano da Verona

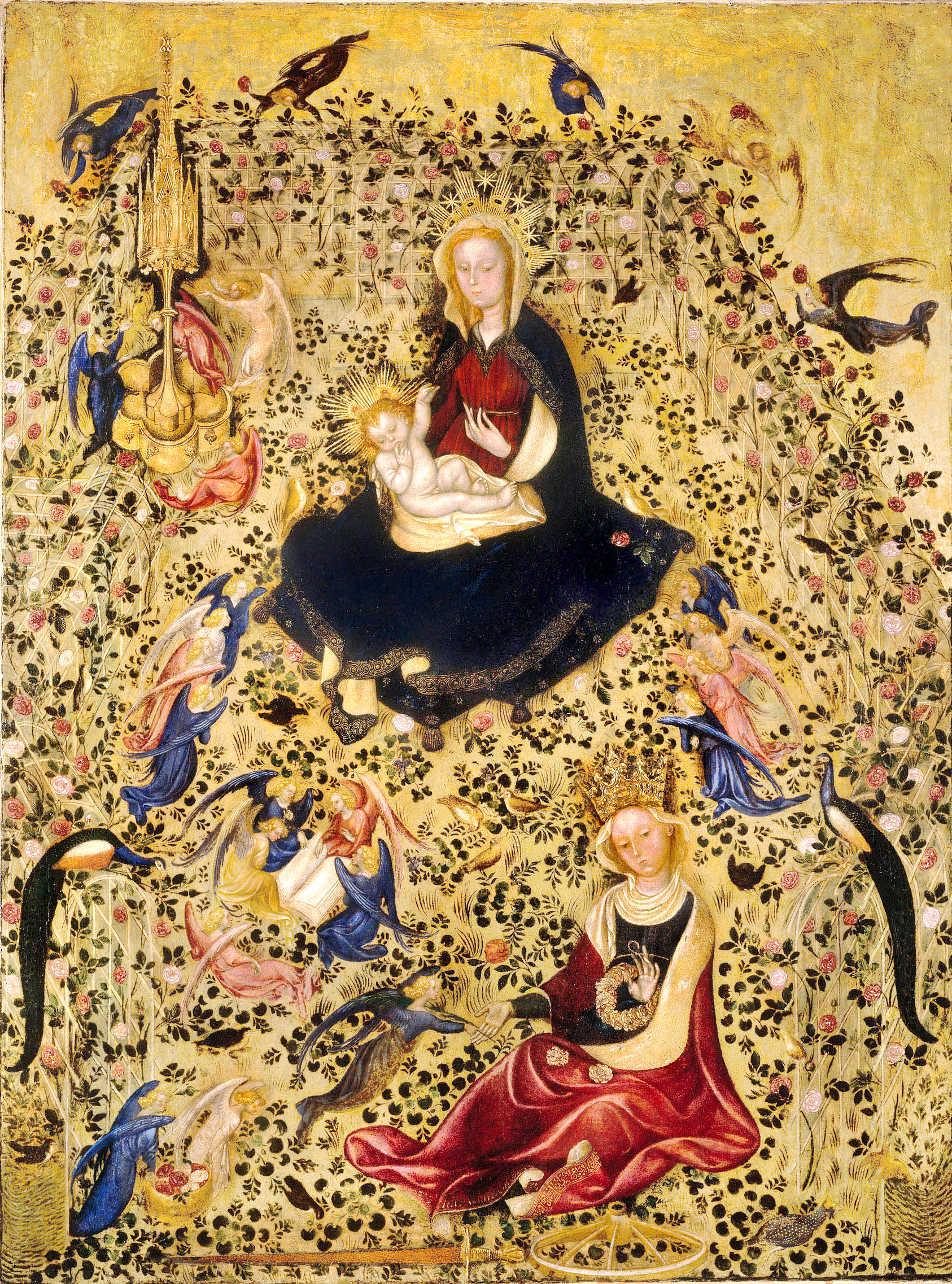
- Artist: Michelino da Besozzo or Stefano da Verona
- Year: c. 1420–1435
- Medium: Tempera on panel
- Dimensions: 130 cm × 95 cm (51 in × 37 in)
- Location: Castelvecchio Museum, Verona

The Madonna of the Rose Garden (Italian: Madonna del Roseto) is an International Gothic painting attributed to Michelino da Besozzo or Stefano da Verona. Dating to c. 1420–1435, it is now in the Castelvecchio Museum in Verona, northern Italy.

== Description ==
The tempera on panel painting shows the traditional theme of the Madonna with Child within an enclosure of roses, a hortus conclusus, symbol of her virginity, in the presence of St. Catherine of Alexandria. The latter, as a princess, is crowned, and is accompanied by her martyrdom attribute of the torture wheel. There are also numerous slender angels. They are performing a series of activities: reading (a hint to the religious texts), collecting petals of rose, playing near a Gothic font (symbolizing the definition of Mary as Fons gratiae, "Spring of Grace").

Two peacocks are roaming in the garden: they are a symbol of the immortality of Christ since early Christian times, when their flesh was considered not liable to rot.

The work has been attributed to both Stefano da Verona or Michelino da Besozzo, with more recent scholars tending to favor the latter.

== See also ==
- Madonna of the Rose Garden (disambiguation)

== Sources ==
- Zuffi, Stefano (2004). Il Quattrocento. Milan: Electa.
