= Basilica of San Zeno, Verona =

Church in Verona, Italy

Basilica of San Zeno
- Basilica di San Zeno Maggiore
- Basilica of San Zeno
- 45°26′33″N 10°58′45″E
- Location: Verona, Veneto
- Country: Italy
- Denomination: Catholic Church
- Tradition: Roman

History
- Status: Minor basilica, parish church

Architecture
- Architectural type: Church
- Style: Romanesque
- Groundbreaking: 967

Administration
- Diocese: Diocese of Verona

The Basilica of San Zeno (also known as San Zeno Maggiore or San Zenone) is an important place of worship of the Catholic Church located in the heart of the San Zeno district of Verona. It is considered one of the masterpieces of medieval architecture.

The present church was built on the site where at least five other religious buildings had previously stood. Its origin seems to go back to a church erected over the tomb of Saint Zeno of Verona, who died between 372 and 380. The building was rebuilt at the beginning of the 9th century at the behest of Bishop Ratold and King of Italy Pepin, who deemed it inappropriate for the body of the patron saint to rest in a poor church. Tradition holds that the archdeacon Pacificus contributed to the construction; the consecration took place on 8 December 806, while on 21 May of the following year the body of Saint Zeno was translated into the crypt. During the invasions of the Magyars, who ravaged northern Italy between 899 and 933, the church suffered significant damage, so much so that in 967 Bishop Ratherius had to promote a new reconstruction. Around the end of the 11th century and the beginning of the 12th, a major project was undertaken to renew the church in Romanesque style. Work was interrupted by the devastating 1117 Verona earthquake, but by about 1138 much of the present church had been completed. In the following centuries, the building underwent further modifications and transformations, but these did not alter its layout, which has substantially preserved its medieval character.

Among the numerous works of art, it houses a masterpiece by Andrea Mantegna, the San Zeno Altarpiece. Also famous are the bronze panels of the portal and the large rose window on the façade, called the "Wheel of Fortune", the work of the stonecutter Brioloto de Balneo. Throughout its history, the basilica inspired numerous poets, including Dante Alighieri, Giosuè Carducci, Heinrich Heine, Gabriele D'Annunzio, and Berto Barbarani.

The church, which in 1973 was elevated to the rank of minor basilica, serves as the seat of a parish that belongs to the Vicariate of Central Verona. According to tradition, its crypt was the place of the marriage of Shakespeare's Romeo and Juliet.

== History ==
=== Early Christian origins ===
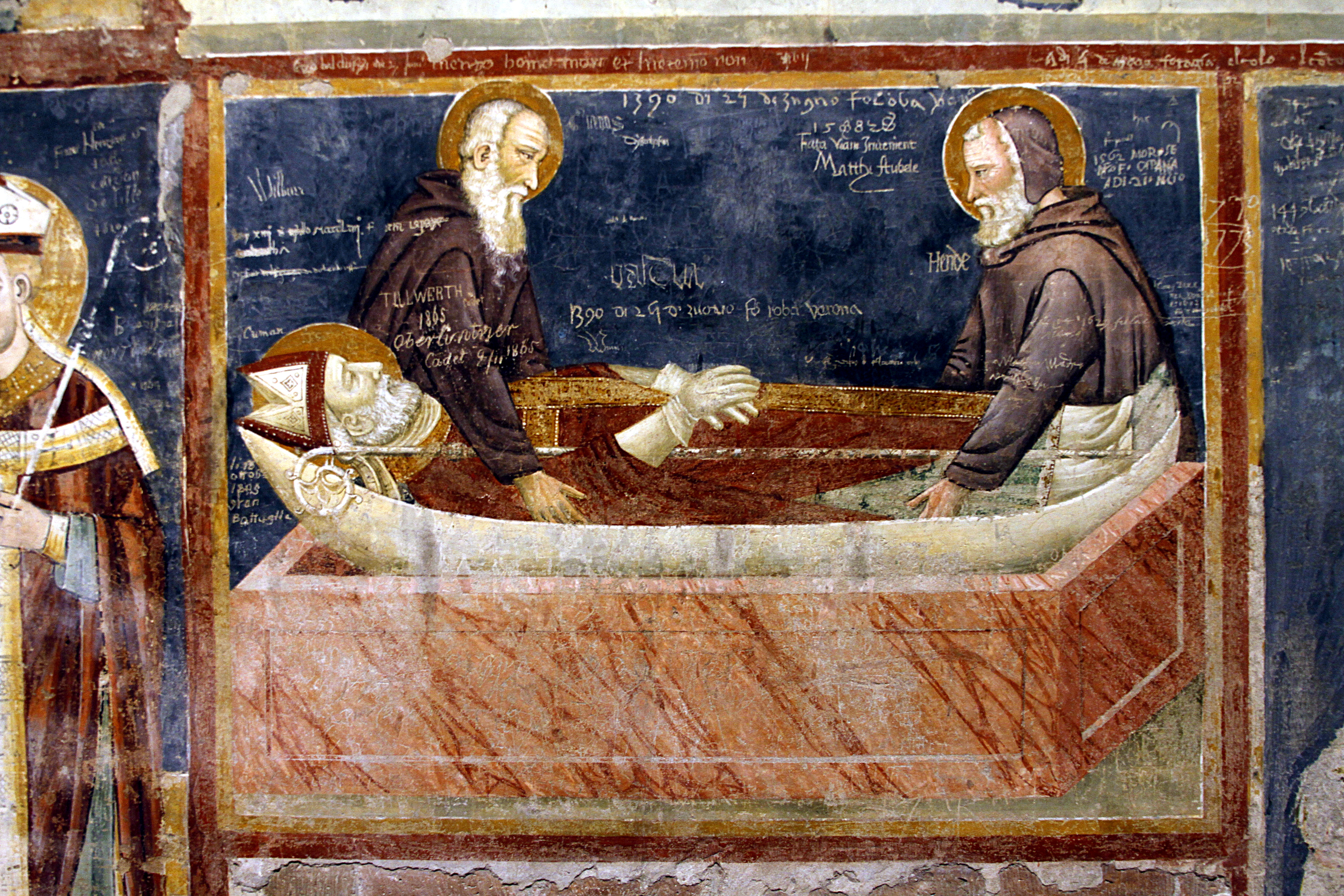
The translation of the body of Saint Zeno of Verona in a fresco inside the basilica, along the right wall of the chancel.

Christian doctrine must have reached Verona very early, given the importance of the city as a road junction, through which soldiers coming from Rome or Palestine certainly passed. If the first bishop of the Diocese of Verona, Euprepius, was appointed around the first half of the 3rd century, the eighth, Zeno of Verona, is believed to have died between 372 and 380, and tradition holds that he was buried not far from the place where the basilica now stands. The Veronese notary Coronato, who lived towards the end of the 7th century, informs us in his Chronicle that a church was built above the bishop's tomb in his honor. It also seems that this first Christian building was restored and enlarged in 589, after the miracle recounted by Saint Gregory the Great and also reported by Paul the Deacon in the Historia Langobardorum. On that occasion, the church is said to have provided protection during a terrible flood: it is told that the waters of the Adige broke down the city walls and reached the building, where many Veronese had taken refuge, submerging it but failing to enter either through the windows or the doors.

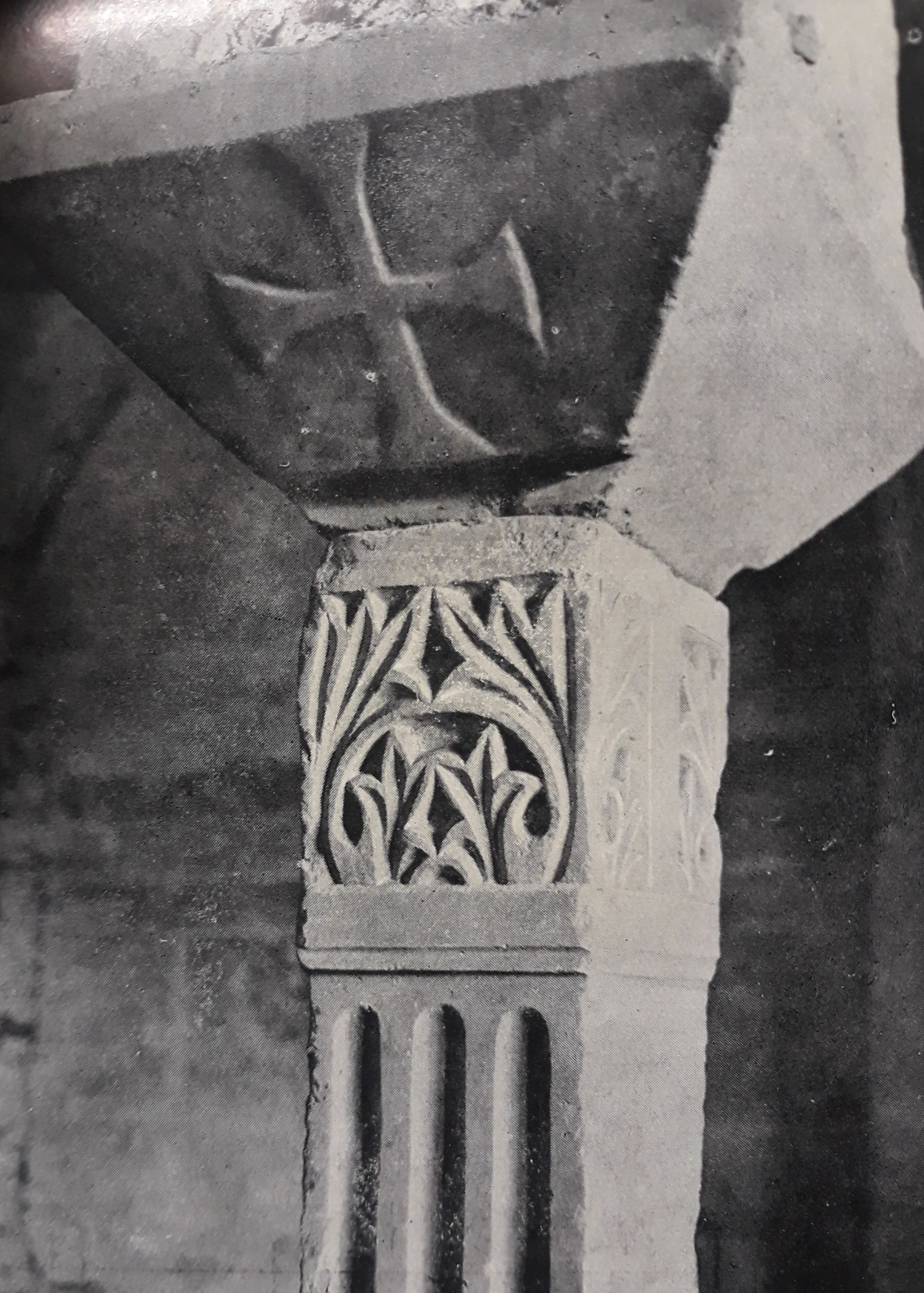
Column with impost block in Byzantine style located in the oratory of Saint Benedict, probably part of the 5th–6th century building.

It is likely that a reconstruction of the building took place during the age of the Goths, as confirmed by some fragments of carved stone in Byzantine style, datable to the 5th–6th century, reused in the oratory of Saint Benedict (accessible from the cloister) and in the bell tower. The historian Luigi Simeoni confirms that this structure may date back to the 6th century, recognizing similarities between the impost blocks of the cloister and the oratory and those of the Basilica of Sant'Apollinare Nuovo in Ravenna. Moreover, it is not unlikely that Theodoric the Great himself, who devoted much attention to the urban renewal of Verona, contributed to this structure, as indeed is mentioned in the Annales Valesiani. It can therefore be inferred that this ancient building was rich in columns, pillars, capitals, and impost blocks, all made of marble, as was the floor.

After the fall of the Gothic kingdom in 553 following the Gothic War, and a brief period under the Byzantine Empire, Verona passed into the hands of the Lombards, and King Alboin made it one of his favorite residences. We know very little about the church during this period, but again thanks to Coronato, we learn that it still preserved the saint's remains and that the Lombards, being Arians, allowed a Catholic bishop to remain in Verona, and that King Desiderius granted certain donations that went to form the Domus Sancti Zenonis.

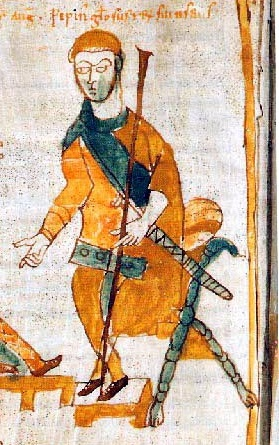
Pepin of Italy, the king who in the 9th century contributed to the construction of a new church building.

It seems that around 804 the church had been severely damaged «ut ad nihilum esset redacta» and the monastery set on fire «ab infidelibus hominibus», perhaps by insubordinate Franks or surviving Arians. In the early 9th century, King Pepin was in Verona, and together with Bishop Ratold he judged it unseemly that the body of the patron saint should rest in a "poor" building. They therefore decided, «propter divinum amorem et reventiam», that a larger and more beautiful church should be built, and that the body should then be translated into a crypt: «a dark underground church upon columns, with the floor of living stone, and they also had a polished marble tomb made which they destined for the body of Saint Zeno for his burial». According to tradition, the works were supervised by the archdeacon Pacificus. (Note: On the epitaph dedicated to Archdeacon Pacificus, set in the Verona Cathedral, it reads: «ECCLESIARUM FUNDATUR, RENOVATOR OPTIMUS ZENONIS PROCULI VITI PETRI ET LAURENTII DE QUOQUE GENITRICIS NEC NON ET GEORGII» In.) The Annales Zenoniani recount that a new church was built, and that the existing one was therefore not enlarged but remained intact for a long time. In the new building, a "dark cavern" was created, that is, a room without light, at least partially excavated underground and intended to house the relics of Saint Zeno. In any case, very little is known about this construction, as very little has survived to the present day. King Pepin also donated to the basilica golden and silver vessels and Gospels adorned with precious gems.

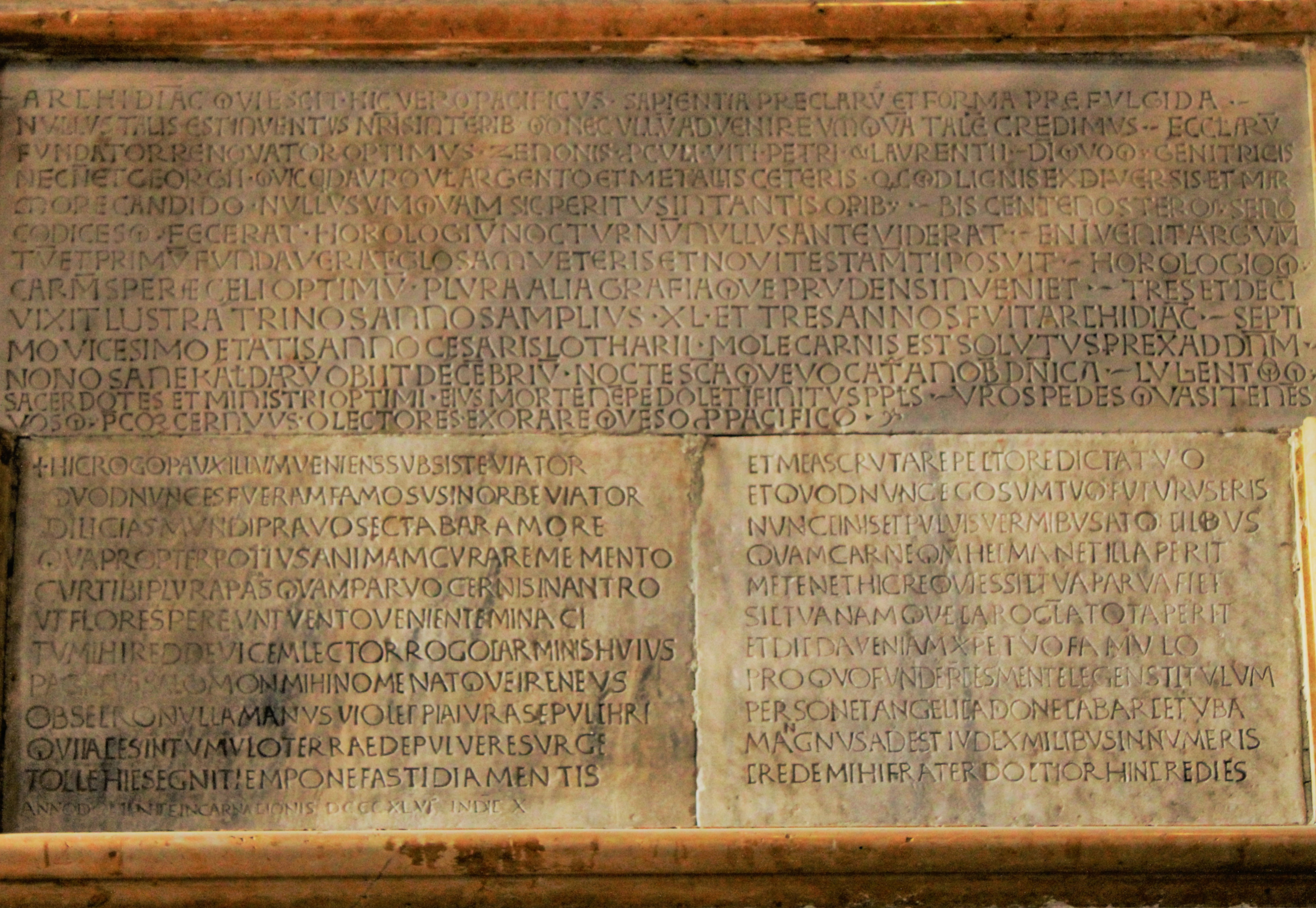
Inscription located in the Verona Cathedral recalling the contribution of Archdeacon Pacificus in the 11th century to the construction of a new basilica.

The consecration of the new building took place on December 8, 806, while on May 21 of the following year the body of Saint Zeno was translated into the crypt which today forms the lowest level of the basilica. The ceremony was very solemn: it was decided that the transport of the relics should be entrusted to the hermit saints of Malcesine, Benignus and Carus, considered at that time the only ones worthy of touching the saint's body. The ceremony was attended by the king, the local bishop Notker, and the bishops of Cremona and Salzburg.

It is believed that the cavern and the chancel above included an apse oriented south–north, like the nearby church of San Procolo, also attributed to Pacificus, as is the present one, and that the apse was covered only by a simple wooden roof structure. The translation of the saint's relics took place with great solemnity, representing an exceptional event for the time, which rekindled among the Veronese the cult of their patron. Pepin's donation, together with those of the bishops and the population, allowed this church to be «not only beautiful, but for those times sublime». Of this building, almost nothing remains today, perhaps only the ancient brick masonry at the back of the building, beyond the last pilaster strip. It was annexed to a Benedictine abbey and, in all likelihood, to a cloister along the eastern side. The first abbot mentioned in the sources is a certain Leo, who held office in 833.

=== From the beginning of the 10th century to about the mid-11th ===
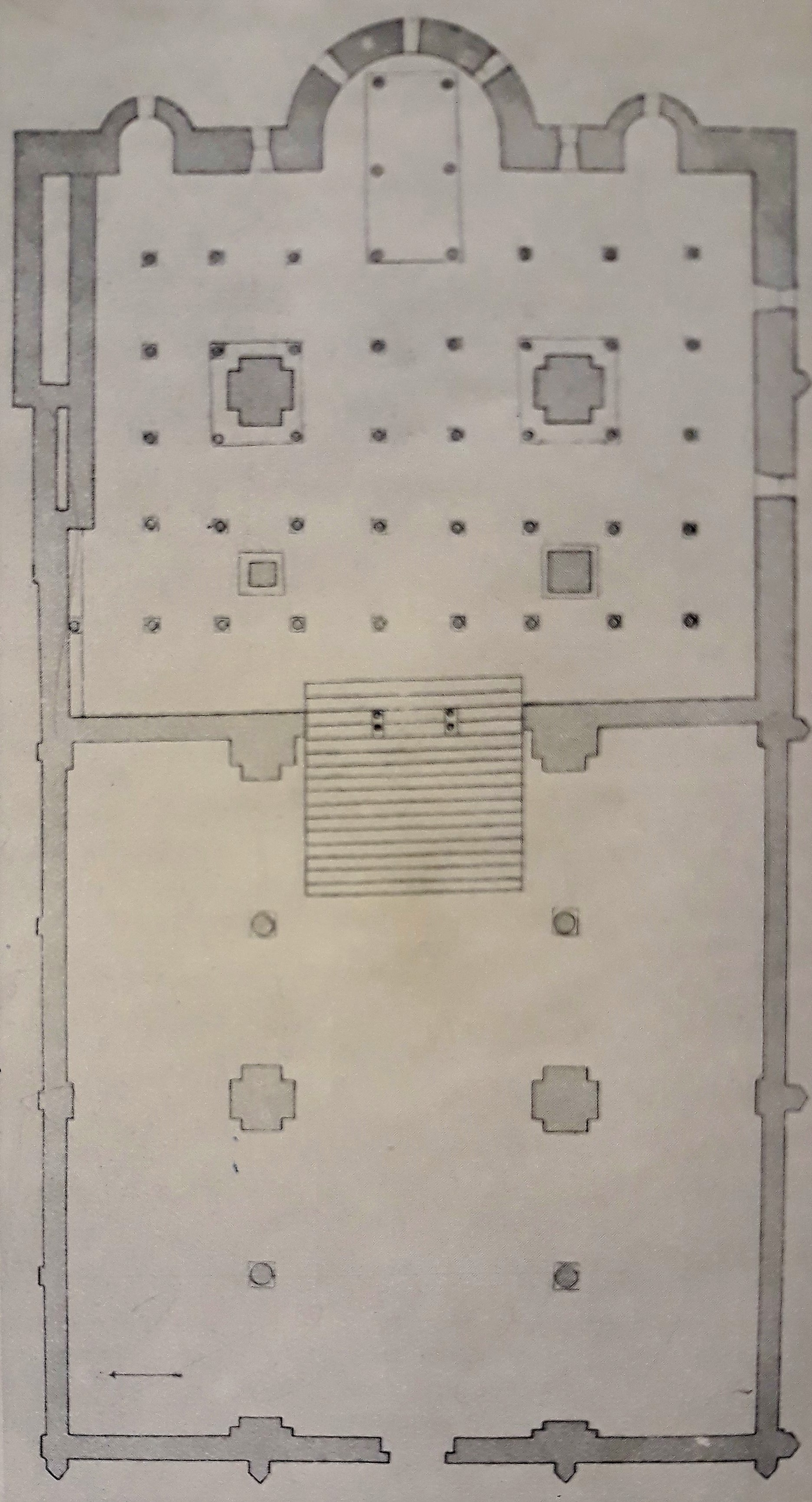
Plan of how the building must have looked in the 10th century.

According to the historian Onofrio Panvinio, the invasions of the Hungarians that raged between 899 and 933 ruined the churches in the suburbs of Verona, located outside the city walls. Thus, the church of San Zeno, which was still the one built in the time of Pepin, was severely damaged along with the monastery, since at that time it was still outside the defensive perimeter (it would only be included with the Scaliger walls of Verona). The same writer states that, foreseeing the danger, the body of the saint was transferred for safety to the cathedral, which was probably then the church of Santa Maria Matricolare; a story not supported by sources but nevertheless considered plausible.

With the end of the Hungarian raids, efforts were made to repair the many damages through the restoration of the monastery and the rebuilding of the church. The reconstruction was commissioned by Bishop Ratherius, who obtained funds for the construction from the German emperor Otto I in exchange for the hospitality he received in Verona in 967. However, Ratherius was soon accused of having used these funds for his own interests, so much so that he had to justify himself in the Apologeticus, explaining that he had instead used them to reform the lower clergy, eliminating concubinage among priests. Therefore, the works must have begun somewhat late, following the canons of the Veronese Romanesque style that was beginning to emerge. A three-aisled building was thus erected, with the central nave raised above the others, divided by arches supported by alternating pillars and columns, with a crypt and a raised floor above it. Its width corresponded to that of the present basilica, its length to about three quarters of it, while its height must have been about half. The naves ended in three apses, a larger central one and two smaller lateral ones.

Some elements of this building still survive today, such as the crypt, which is attributed to the 10th century. On the exterior, its walls are still visible on the eastern side, near the bell tower, where the material used is brickwork up to a height of 7.60 meters, above which runs a saw-tooth band indicating the beginning of what was once the eaves cornice. Another wall probably datable to the same period is the one along the side of the left nave, serving as the back wall of the cloister, where the tuff structure with irregular blocks arranged in layers mixed with some brick fragments is clearly visible. A diploma of Emperor Henry II informs us that in 1014 the relics of Saint Zeno had already been transferred back to the basilica (in villula Sancti Zenonis).

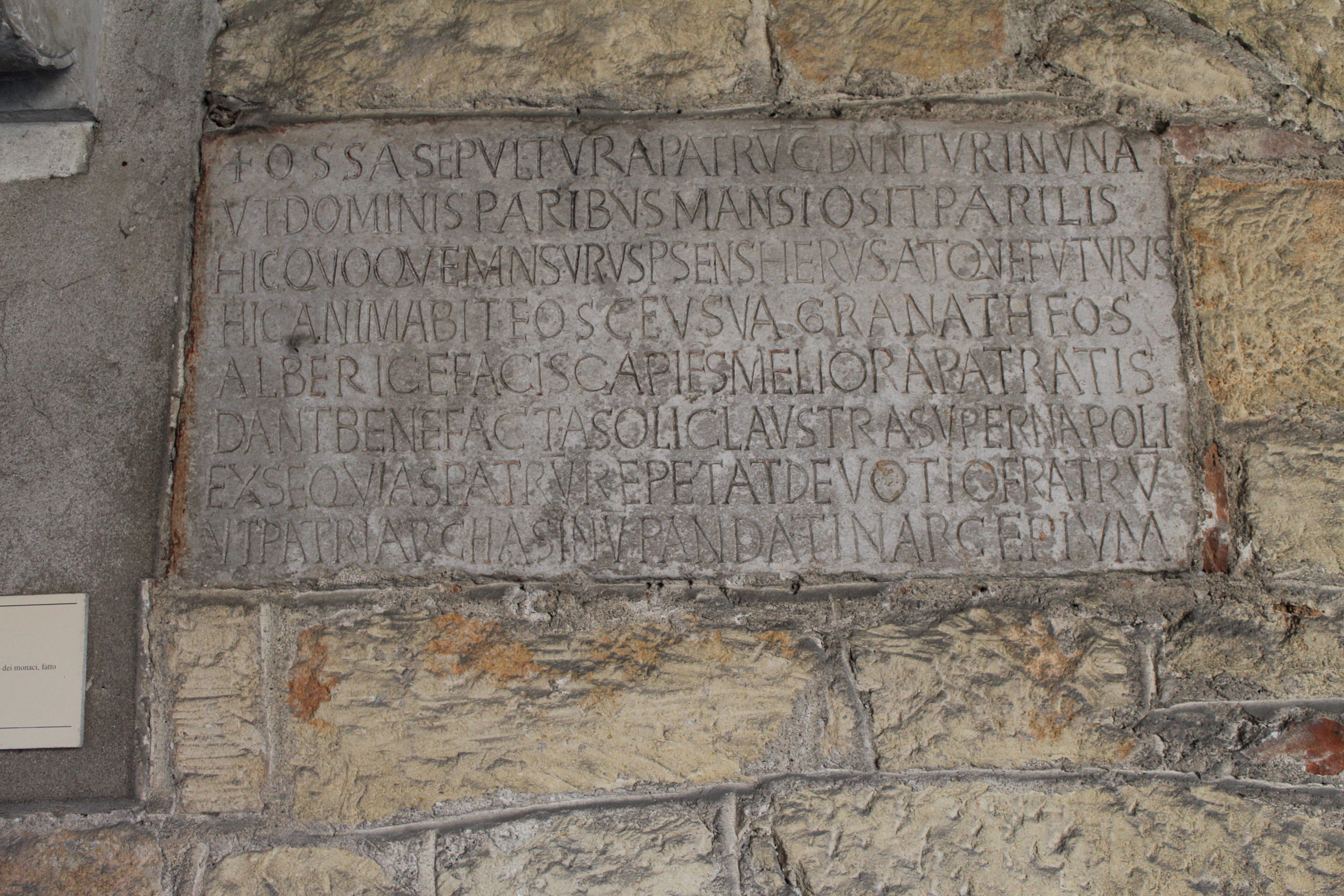
Inscription in the cloister of the abbey of San Zeno recalling the presence of the monks' tomb built by Abbot Alberic in the 11th century.

In the first decades of the 11th century, the first Romanesque church was thus completed, and it was decided to improve it by raising it. Almost nothing remains today of this intervention, since later works largely renewed, and partly concealed, what might have survived. According to the architect and superintendent Alessandro Da Lisca, in these years the building was reinforced in its walls and raised to reach the height of the present roofs.

In 1045, Abbot Alberic (1045–1067) began the construction of the bell tower, as recalled by an inscription placed at its base on the western outer side. (Note: The inscription reads: «ANNO INCARNATIONIS DOMINI NOSTRI IESU CRISTI MILLESIMO XLV INDICATIONE XIII, ANNO SEPTIMO DOMNI HEINRICI IMPERATORIS, NONO VERO ANNO DOMINI WALTHERII PONTIFICIS, AD HONOREM DEI ET SANCTI ZENONIS DOMNUS ALBERICUS ABBAS ANNO PRIMO SUE CONSECRATIONIS, HANC TURRIM CUM FRATRIBUS SUIS INCHOAVIT». In.) At the abbot's death in 1067, the tower must have reached a height roughly over half of the current one, and perhaps a belfry with mullioned windows had already been completed. Alberic also had the monks' sepulcher built; it is located in the cloister on the side facing the church. It consists of a red marble tomb, covered by a thick slab adorned with a large cross in relief. It is not certain that this is the original from the 11th century, but it is very likely, considering that the cloister already existed. Above the tomb there is an inscription commemorating it. (Note: The inscription on the burial stone reads: «OSSA SEPULTURA PATRUM CONDUNTUR IN UNA, UT DOMINIS PARIBUS MANSIO SIT PARILIS: HIC QUOQUE MANSURUS PRESENS HERUS ATQUE FUTURUS HIC ANIMABIT EOS, CEU SUA GRANA, THEOS. ALBERICE FACIS, CAPIES MELIORA PATRATIS, DANT BENE FACTA SOLI, CLAUSTRA SUPERNA POLI EXSEQUIAS PATRUM REPETAT DEVOTIO FRATRUM, UT PATRIARCHA SINUM PANDAT IN ARCE PIUM». In.)

=== The renovation at the beginning of the 12th century and the earthquake of 1117 ===
Towards the end of the 11th century and the beginning of the 12th, a major renovation project of San Zeno's church was undertaken. The intention was to enlarge it with the addition of a new structure in front of the old façade, corresponding today to the first bay of the building; in addition to this extension, it was planned to renew the old longitudinal walls, both of the side aisles and of the main nave. The new building, as can still be seen today, was to feature walls made of well-squared tuff, projecting pilaster strips, a marble gallery consisting of small arches decorated with twin columns, and at the top a cornice of arches with a double ring and corbels in double projection, enriched with fine carvings and a frieze finely sculpted in white marble. When the devastating 1117 Verona earthquake struck, this reconstruction must have already been well advanced, since the extension was almost completed and the renovation of the right aisle had already begun.

Despite the damage caused by the earthquake, which destroyed countless other buildings in the city, the work already begun was not abandoned, and it was decided to complete it, albeit in a more modest way, reusing, as far as possible, the material that had collapsed for the new walls. Thus, from 1117 to 1138, the ancient longitudinal walls, which had largely fallen or become unsafe, were rebuilt, with the main nave being reinforced with new clustered pillars. By 1138 all this work must have been finished, and the prothyrum added to the new façade was also in place, as confirmed by the epigraph located on the southern exterior side of the aisle, near the façade. This epigraph states that the restoration of the bell tower and the construction of the first belfry was completed in 1120, while the reconstruction and extension of the church, with the addition of at least one bay to the west, was completed in 1138 («A RESTAURATIONE VERO IPSIUS CAMPANILIS CONFLUXERANT ANNI LVIII»).

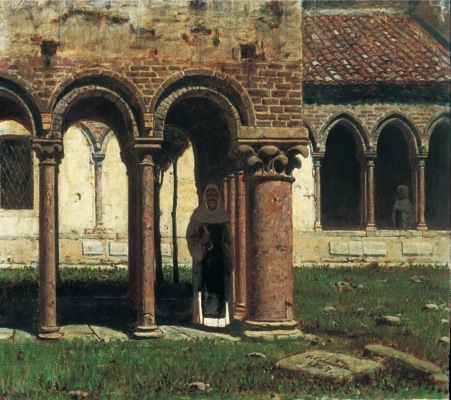
The cloister of the Abbey of San Zeno in a painting of 1867 by Vincenzo Cabianca.

At the same time, a religiosus vir, priest Gaudio, took care of restoring the cloister, completed in 1123, while Gerardo between 1165 and 1187 raised the bell tower, which was then finished in 1173 under the direction of master Martino, as recalled by a long inscription on the outer wall of the southern side. (Note: On the southern side the following Latin inscription is engraved: In 1178, during the time of Pope Alexander III, when Frederick was emperor and Ognibene bishop, the venerable Abbot Gerardo, among the many properties he granted to the monastery, had the bell tower of the same church elegantly decorated and the new loggias built above the old ones, and thus constructed an extraordinary pinecone with the help of his confreres and overseers Samonone and Rainaldo, and other religious men. This work was executed by Master Martino. — Ammo D(omi)nicce incarnationis MCLXXVIII indiccione XI t(em)p(o)ribus d(omi)ni Alexandri p(a)p(ae) III atq(e) d(omi)ni Friderici imp(e)r(ator)is et d(omi)ni O(mn)eboni veron(ensis) ep(iscop)i. d(omi)n(u)s Giradus D(e)i gra(ti)a venerabilis abb(as) monas/terii s(an)c(t)i Zenonis int(er) alia pl(ur)ima que contulit monasterio beneficia eiusde(m) ecc(lesi)ae ca(m)panile decent(er) exornari et balcones novos sup(er) balcones veteres elevari dein(de) capitellvm mirabiliter c(o)strvctu(m) ut cunctis n(un)c manifeste appa ret cu(m) suis fr(atr)ib(us) fieri fec(it) coadiuvantibus Salomone atque Rainaldo eiusdem operis massariis aliisq(ue)religiosis viris quod opus a magistro Martino factu(m) In and.) From 1138 to 1187, the last year of abbot Gerardo's office, no significant work was carried out on the church, and efforts could therefore focus on completing the bell tower and casting the bells. This work is attested by an inscription, dating to 1178 and placed on the southern side near the façade, which mentions the restoration of the bell tower and goes on to state that «renovatione autem et ecclesie augmentatione (confluscerant anni) XL». It is believed that Abbot Gerardo was the Abbot of San Zeno who lived under Emperor Frederick Barbarossa and who is mentioned by Dante Alighieri in Canto XVIII of the Purgatorio.

The shape of the Romanesque cloister's columns and capitals, which show no mixture of reused fragments, demonstrates that Gaudio's work must have been a complete renovation and not a mere restoration. Two inscriptions in the cloister, located near the tomb of Giuseppe della Scala, record that Gaudio also had a sepulchre decorated with paintings built and donated a continuous supply of oil to the abbey so that a lamp could be kept burning in the cloister throughout the night. In 1145 the construction also began of the large merloned tower of the abbey, still standing today, whose interiors are decorated with frescoes from the 13th century. At that time it served as a defensive bastion, since the basilica was outside the city walls and therefore exposed to dangers; it was not until the intervention of the Scaliger lords that it was included within the city's defensive curtain wall.

=== Works from the late 12th century to the mid-13th century ===
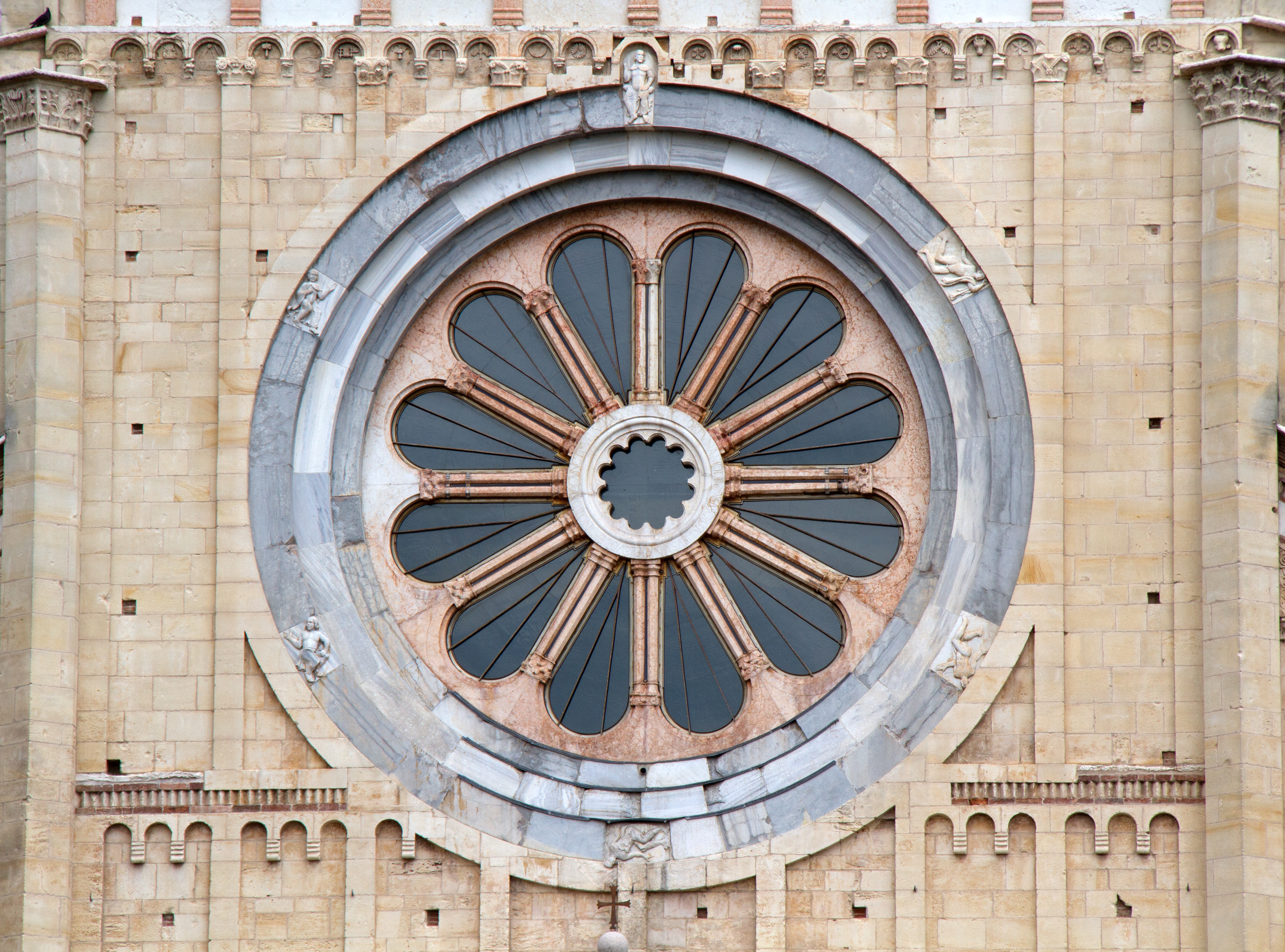
The Wheel of Fortune, the rose window created by master Brioloto de Balneo.

Abbot Gerardo was succeeded by Abbot Ugo, who in the second year of his office, 1189, negotiated with a sculptor for some works on the church. The master was named Brioloto de Balneo, or at least this is how he is mentioned in an inscription dated April 14, 1189, walled inside the building not far from the baptistery: this is the first document that refers to him, although without mentioning his origin or provenance. (Note: The inscription, partly lost, that mentions master Brioloto de Balneo, placed in the wall of the right aisle near the baptistery, reads: «QUISQUE BRIOLOTUM LAUDET QUIA DONA MERETUR SUBLIMIS HABEAT, ARTEFICEM COMMENDAT OPUS TAM RITE POLITUM SUM NOTAT ESSE PERITUM. HIC FORTUNE FECIT ROTAM S. E. CUIUS PRECOR TENE NOTAM – ET – VERONE PRIMITUS BALNEUM LAPIDEUM IPSE DESIGNAVIT – UNDE TURBA FORTITER POSSIDEAT PRECIBUS IUSTORUM REGNA BEATA – IN QUIBUS U PARATA ISTE VERENDUS HOMO NIMIUM QUEM FAMA DECORAT QUIA LUCIS IN EDE LABORAT». In.) In this inscription he is credited with the creation of the so-called "Wheel of Fortune", the rose window on the façade of the church decorated with six statues depicting the alternating phases of human life, that is, Fortune (in the Latin sense of "destiny").

In his work at San Zeno, Brioloto was certainly assisted by the stonecutter Adamino da San Giorgio, who left his signature on a capital inside the church, reading «magister Adam murarius qui fuit de Sanzorzio», and who is also mentioned in two documents of 1217 and 1225. He is credited with the arch rings of the crypt entrances and the upper cornices of the façade. It is believed that Adamino may have come from San Giorgio di Valpolicella, or more probably from the Como area.

To insert the great Wheel of Fortune, a large opening had to be cut into the wall, which was subsequently rebuilt with an external facing of neatly squared tuff blocks in the area between the two large pilaster strips and the two horizontal cornices. Inside, however, the new tuff facing was limited only to the renewed wall, leaving on the sides the old alternating courses of tuff and brick. Above the new horizontal cornice, the wall of the tympanum was externally clad in marble on which a scene of the Last Judgment was executed, now lost.

A document dated March 30, 1194, reported by Giovanni Battista Biancolini, informs us that in that same year the Canons of the Cathedral granted the Confederation of the Intrinsic Clergy, which officiated at San Zeno, the faculty of administering baptism, and therefore a baptistery had to be built in the church. It is believed that this structure too was commissioned to Brioloto because of some stylistic similarities with his works. Another inscription from 1212, formerly located in a small courtyard until 1732 and now preserved in the Maffeian Lapidary Museum, recalls the reconstruction of a doorway in the monastery. From the same period date the knotted columns and the statue of the Patron Saint placed inside, the work of an anonymous sculptor. On August 24, 1225, Cardinal Adelardo Cattaneo died and was buried in the church's chancel in a simple sarcophagus, later removed in the 19th century and relocated to the cloister; it is therefore likely that by that year this part of the church was already complete. In any case, it was certainly finished by around 1300, when the pulpits were built.

On May 23, 1238, the sumptuous wedding of Selvaggia, daughter of the Holy Roman Emperor Frederick II of Swabia, and Ezzelino III da Romano took place in the basilica; it is presumed that the emperor himself stayed in the abbey tower.

=== Gothic and Renaissance transformations (14th–15th century) ===
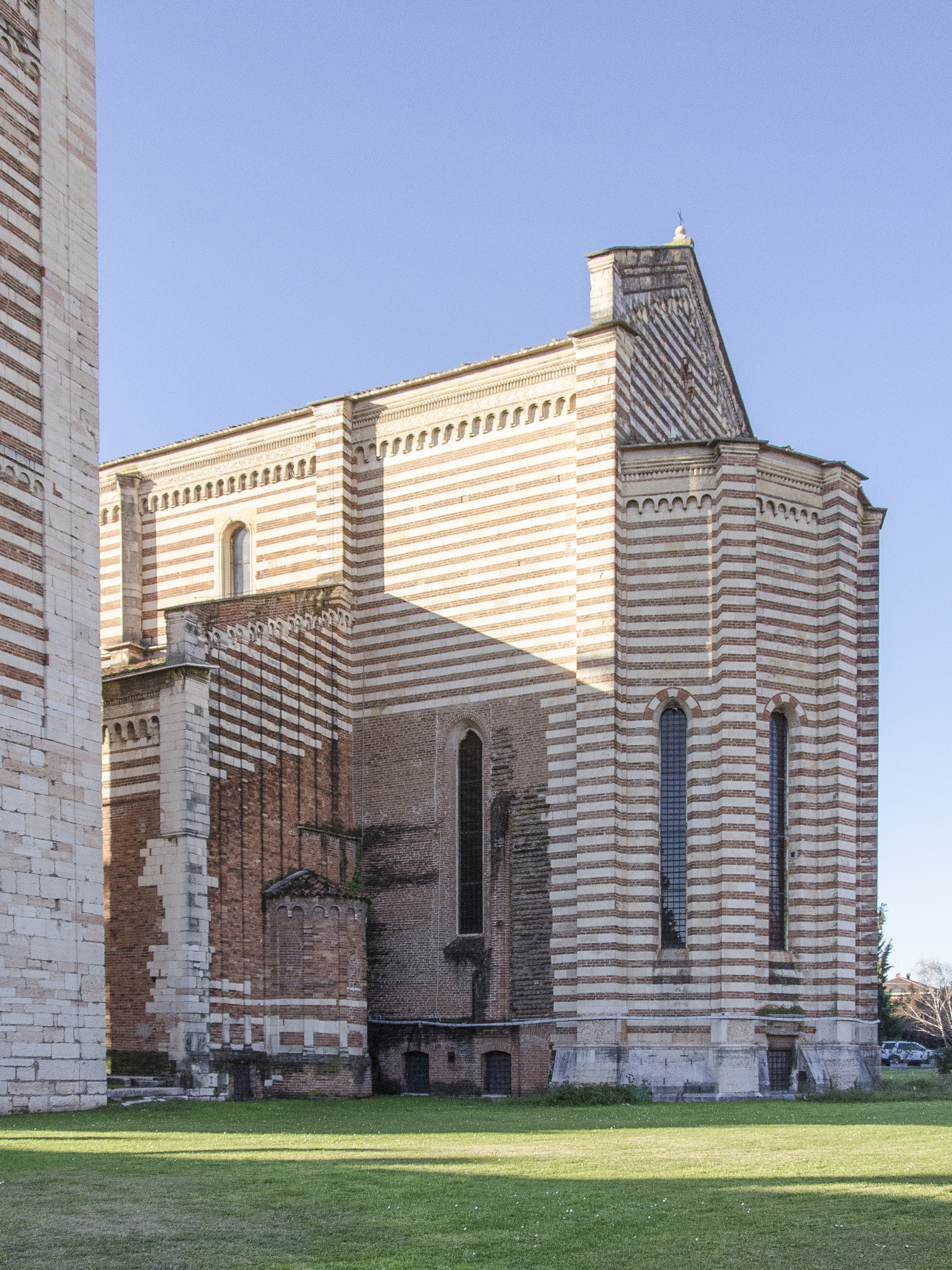
The apse area of the basilica, where several construction phases of the building can easily be identified.

Between the end of the 13th century and the beginning of the 14th, the city of Verona went through a period marked by intense building activity, during which many structures, especially religious ones, were constructed or rebuilt. Examples include the church of Sant'Eufemia, begun by the Augustinians in 1275, the reconstruction of the church of San Paolo in Campo Marzio, and, in the early 14th century, the foundation of the basilica of Santa Anastasia by the Dominicans. A characteristic feature of all these buildings was the use of brick alone for the walls, instead of alternating it with tuff, which had given earlier constructions the typical appearance of Veronese Romanesque, with its succession of red and white bands.

At that time, the apse of San Zeno's basilica still dated back to the 10th century, so that the main apse must have appeared too low for its conch, too narrow in its curve, and thus out of proportion with the spacious and tall church that had recently been completed. It was therefore decided to enlarge it, although this work seems to have taken place in different phases: the first around the year 1300, and the second towards the end of the 14th century. Towards the end of the 14th century the architect Giovanni da Ferrara, who together with Giacomo da Gozo had designed the Ponte delle Navi for Cansignorio and most likely the Castelvecchio Bridge, was in Verona. Abbot Ottonello Pasti commissioned him to complete the enlargement and carry out further modifications. Giovanni began the work on 24 March 1386 and, after several interruptions due to political events, completed it in July 1398, assisted throughout by his son Nicolò. The renewed apse, in Gothic style, was shortly afterwards decorated with frescoes by Abbot Pietro Paolo Cappelli, whose coat of arms is carved on the triumphal arch, and by Abbot Pietro Emilei, the last monk-abbot to lead the abbey, who vainly placed his noble coat of arms on the keystone and on the pillar of the same arch.

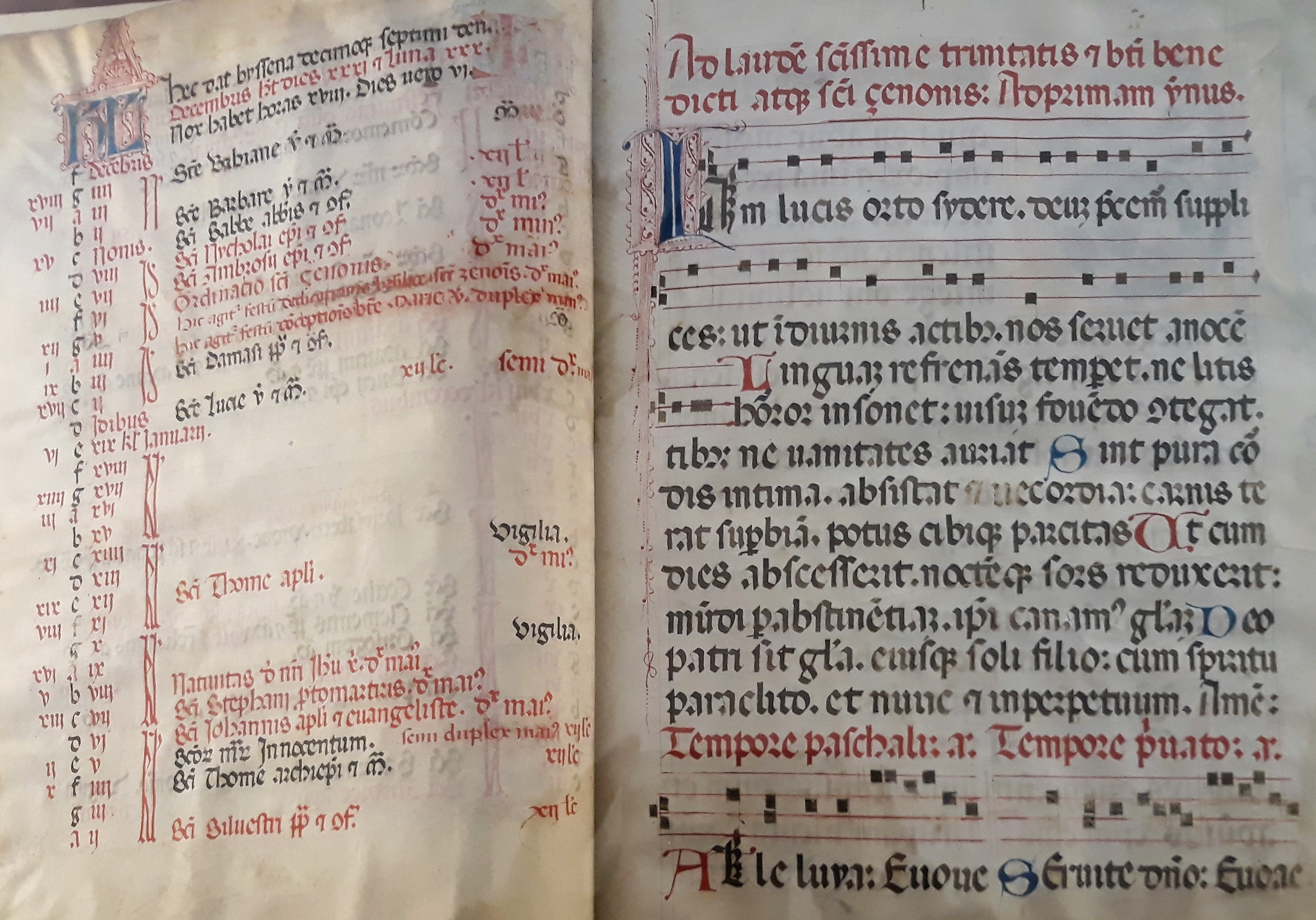
Breviary used in the Abbey of San Zeno in the 15th century, today preserved in the Verona Public Library.

Despite these improvements, throughout the 14th century the monastery went through a period of severe decline: the number of monks had dwindled and the economic resources had been greatly reduced as a result of confiscations carried out by the Scaliger family. On 24 June 1405, with the devotion of Verona to Venice, the city came under the control of the Serenissima, and the abbey of San Zeno ceased to be headed by monk-abbots; in 1425 began the period of the commendatory abbots.

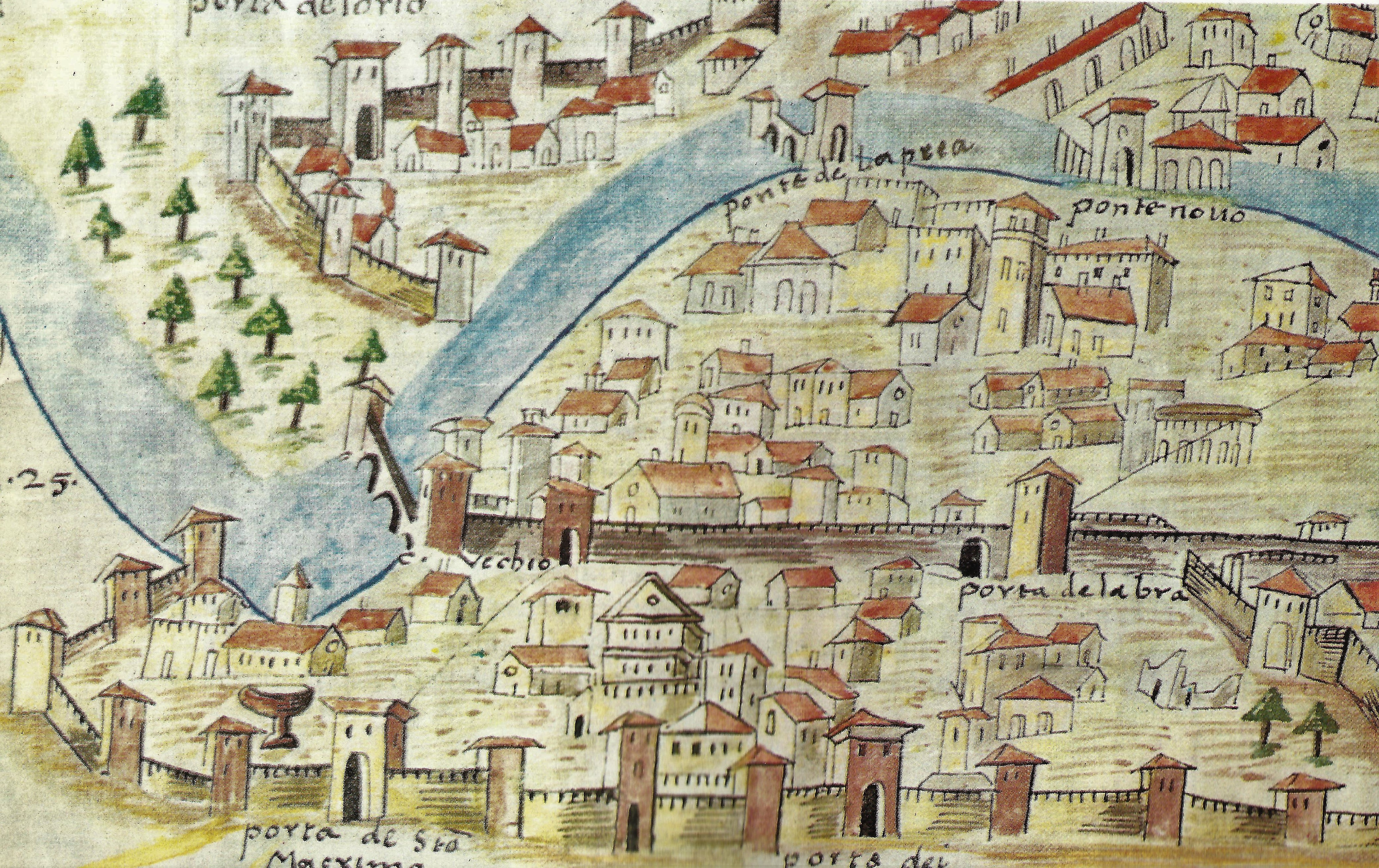
Detail of Almagià's Map (1440), with the Abbey of San Zeno in the lower left corner.

Marco Emilei, successor of Abbot Pietro, was appointed commendatory abbot by Pope Martin V and introduced several new regulations for the monastery, including separating the abbot's table from the monks' table, establishing that the resident monks should never be fewer than twelve, while the lay brothers had to be at least three. He also ensured a stable income of 500 florins of gold for the maintenance of the structure and obtained from the Pope the dispatch of three monks to reform the convent according to the Rule of Saint Benedict. To meet this reform and, in particular, to reach the minimum number of monks, other German religious had to be admitted, and they soon came to dominate the Abbey of San Zeno. In 1450 the monastery entered into an alliance and brotherhood pact with the monastery of San Quirino and the Tegernsee Abbey. Only with the plague of 1630 were the German monks removed from the abbey; after the epidemic, others came from Germany to occupy the vacant posts, but Abbot Pietro Contarini opposed them and obtained from the Republic of Venice a decree stipulating that only Veronese, or at most Venetian, monks could reside in the monastery. Thus Contarini called in the Vallombrosan monks to fill the abbey.

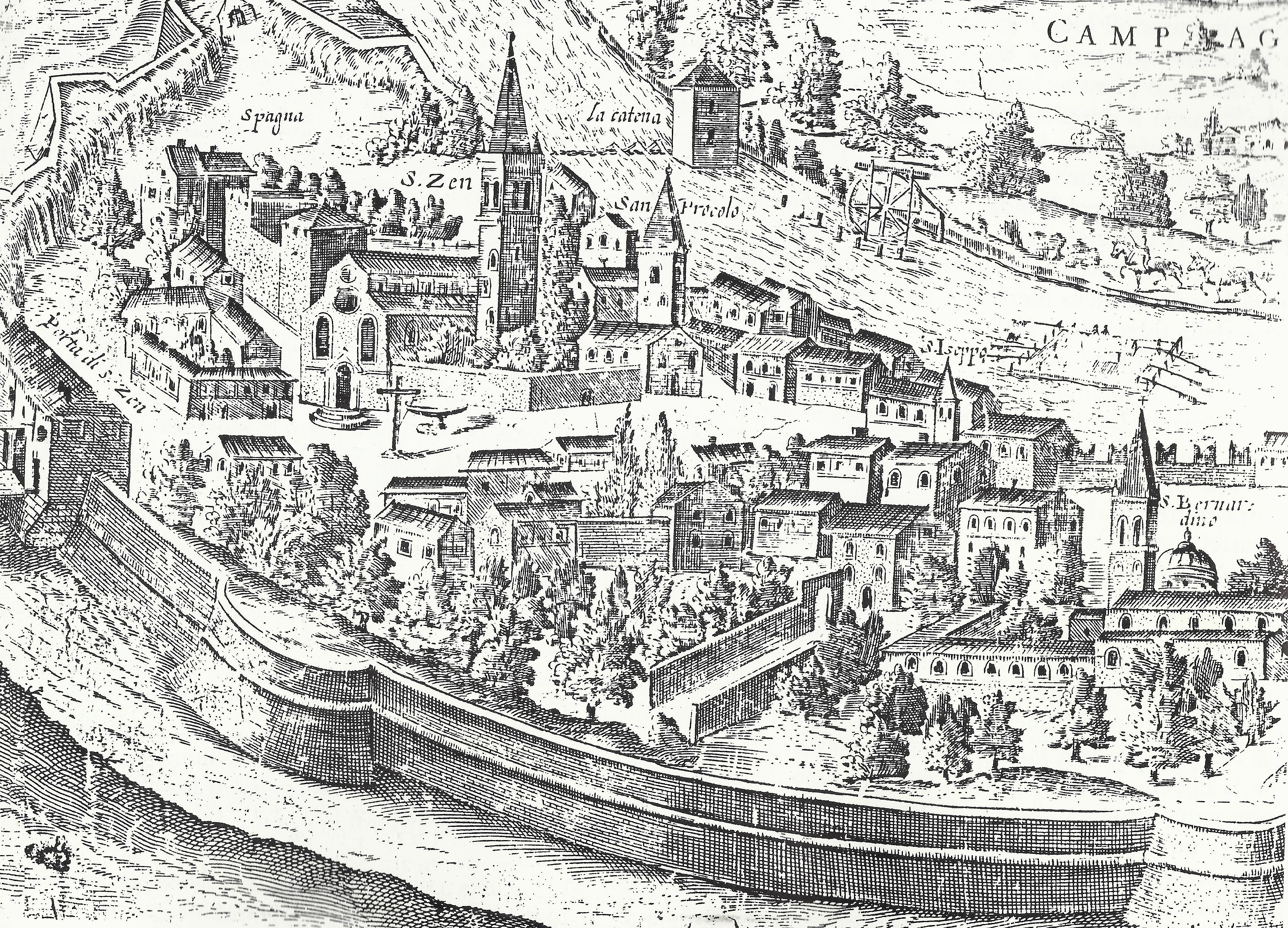
Drawing by Paolo Ligozzi depicting the abbey around the 17th century.

In 1443 Gregorio Correr was consecrated abbot, and thanks to him important works and innovations were carried out in the basilica. Until then, the office and the chanting of psalms took place in the crypt, which, since it still had the small 10th-century apse, was largely occupied by the chancel and choir. The space for the faithful was insufficient, especially on feast days. The upper church, instead, offered a more comfortable and healthier environment. Correr, also with the aim of enhancing the prestige of his family, undertook at his own expense the construction of the choir and the new high altar. At his death, however, the choir was still unfinished, but in his will he ordered that it be completed at the expense of his heirs, in the same form in which it had been begun. Gregorio Correr was also the patron of the famous San Zeno Altarpiece, painted by Andrea Mantegna for the high altar of the basilica.

In the second half of the 15th century, the sacristy, located above the chapel of Saint Benedict, was also restored. The works seem to have been initiated through the efforts of Abbot Jacopo Surain (1464–1482), who, however, did not live long enough to see the project completed and therefore left a legacy to ensure its conclusion, as we know from a necrology of the monastery. The works, interrupted, were then resumed and finished by his successor, Cardinal Giovanni Battista Zeno.

=== Adaptations and renovations from the 16th century to the present ===
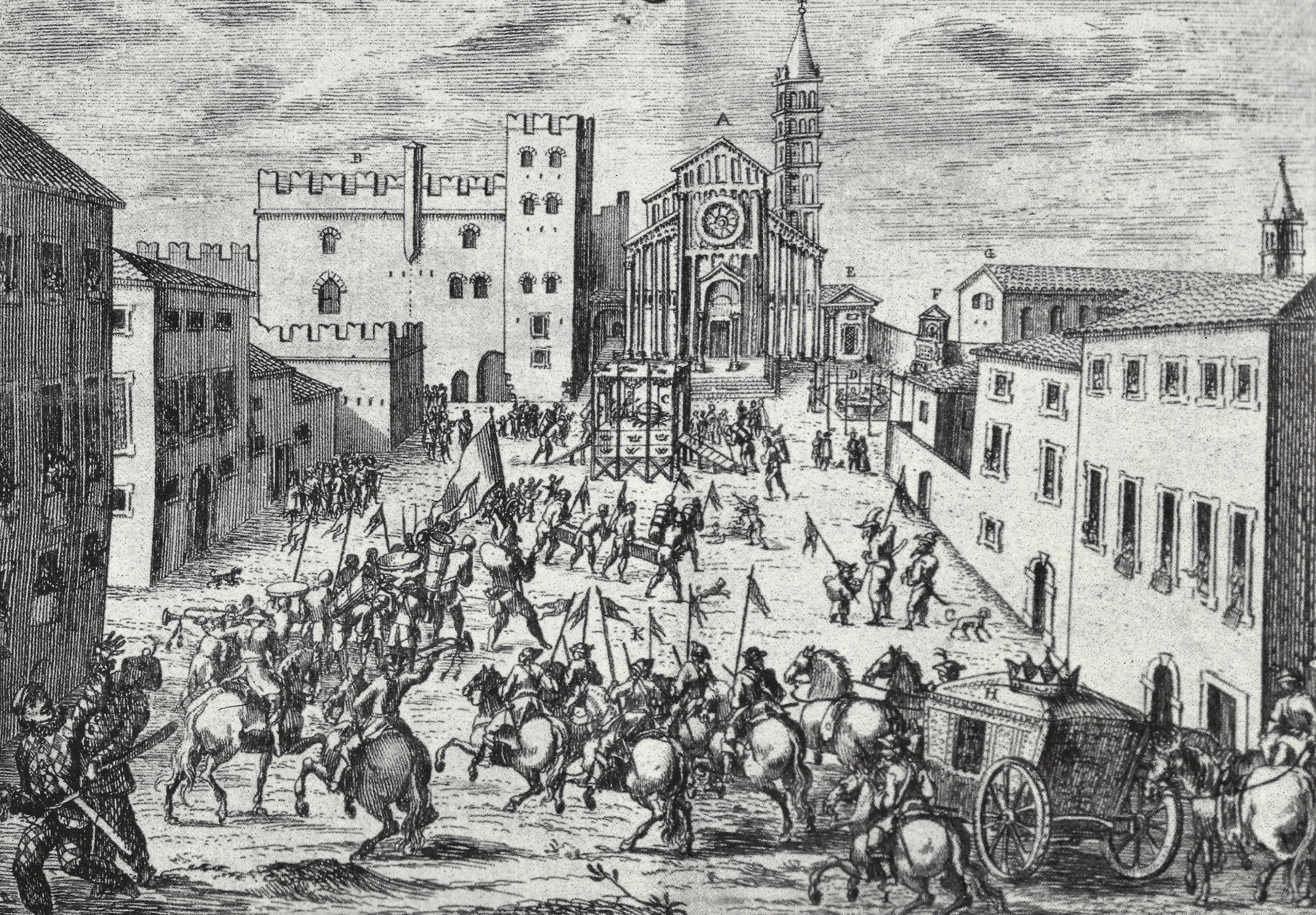
The abbey complex of San Zeno in 1770, a few decades before its suppression.

At the beginning of the 16th century, a new spirit took hold in Italy, especially in the arts. The discovery of Vitruvius's treatise De architectura gave one of the greatest impulses to this new style and taste, which were fully expressed in what would later be defined as Renaissance architecture. The basilica of San Zeno was also affected by these changes, so that at the beginning of the 16th century many works were carried out, including demolitions, transformations, and relocations, which contributed to giving the church its definitive appearance. Among other things, the rood screen (the same was done in the Cathedral in 1534, at San Fermo Maggiore in 1573, and at Santa Anastasia in 1580) and the side staircases were demolished. In addition, a large staircase was built which, closing the three central accesses to the crypt and extending across the full width of the central nave, allowed one to ascend from the lower parish church to the upper church. The choir was removed from the upper church and, following the demolition of the 15th-century altar and the relocation of the triptych to the back of the apse, a new high altar was built under the triumphal arch. Overall, the work was carried out with great care and preserved most of the 15th-century choir. For the new altar, material from the demolition of the old one was reused; indeed, one can see on it pieces of brick pillars employed as spolia. In 1535 the arch of the new side altar, distinctly Renaissance in style and dedicated to the Virgin, was completed.

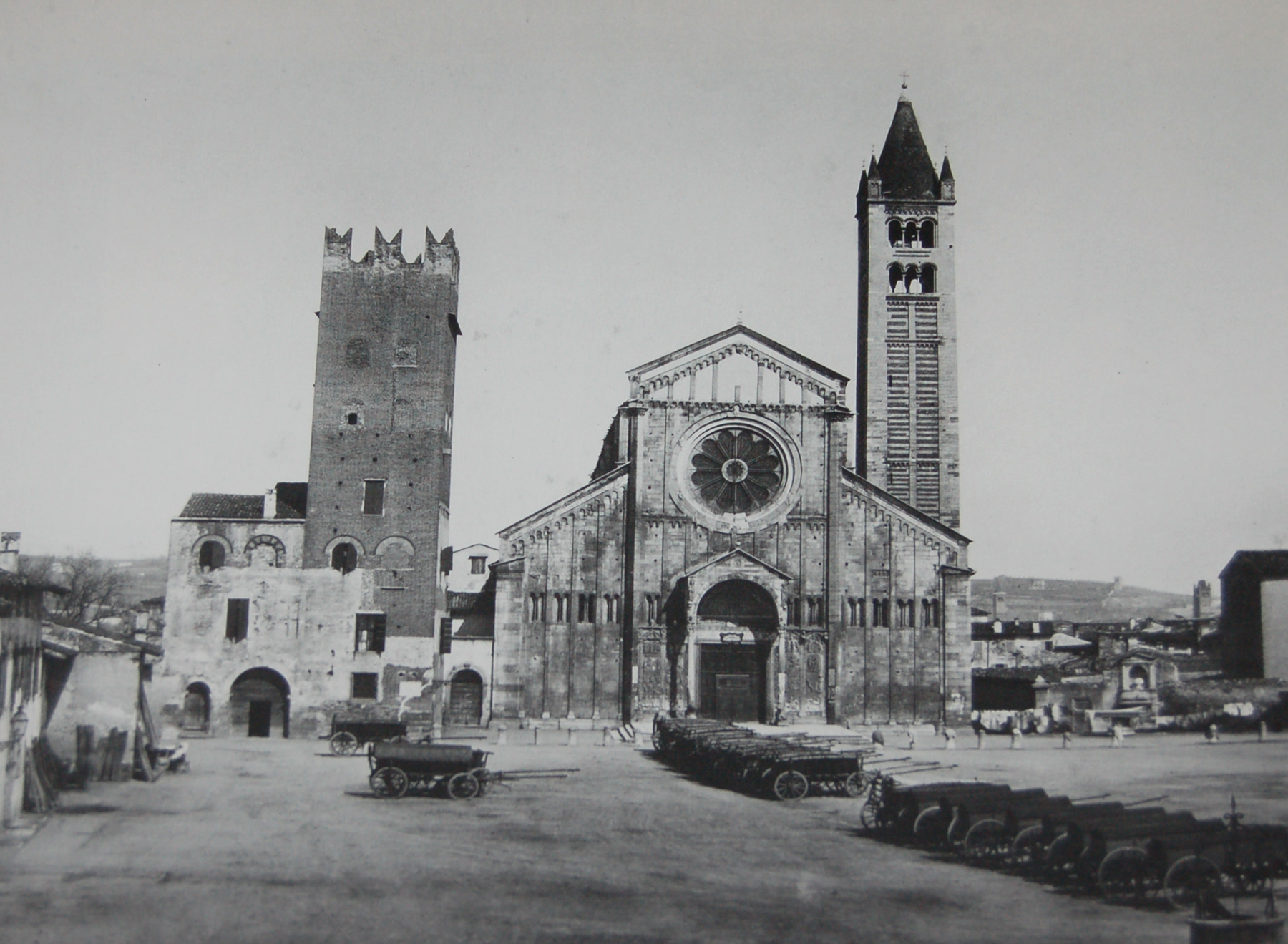
The basilica in a photograph taken around 1860 by Moritz Lotze.

In the early years of the 16th century, under Abbot Marco Cornelio, work on the high altar was completed with the construction on its mensa of a very large tabernacle, today turned upside down and used as the base of the stoup, the first on the left as one enters. Architect Da Lisca considered that the modification of the floors of the apse and monastery may also be attributed to this occasion. Further modifications to the high altar were made by the cardinal and abbot Carlo Rezzonico in 1771, who, at his own expense, added a new forepart with a new tabernacle. Rezzonico also had the two ancient bells, dating back to 1149, melted into a single one.

On 5 December 1770 the Serenissima decreed the suppression of the abbey of San Zeno, whose real estate passed largely to the Civil Hospitals of Verona, while the library collection became the first nucleus of the public library of Verona. When in 1816 the nearby church of San Procolo was suppressed, the local parish was transferred to San Zeno and the abbot also acquired the title of archpriest. Moreover, sculptures, tombstones, and altars from the now unused parish church were brought to San Zeno. In 1801 the demolition of part of the abbey complex began.

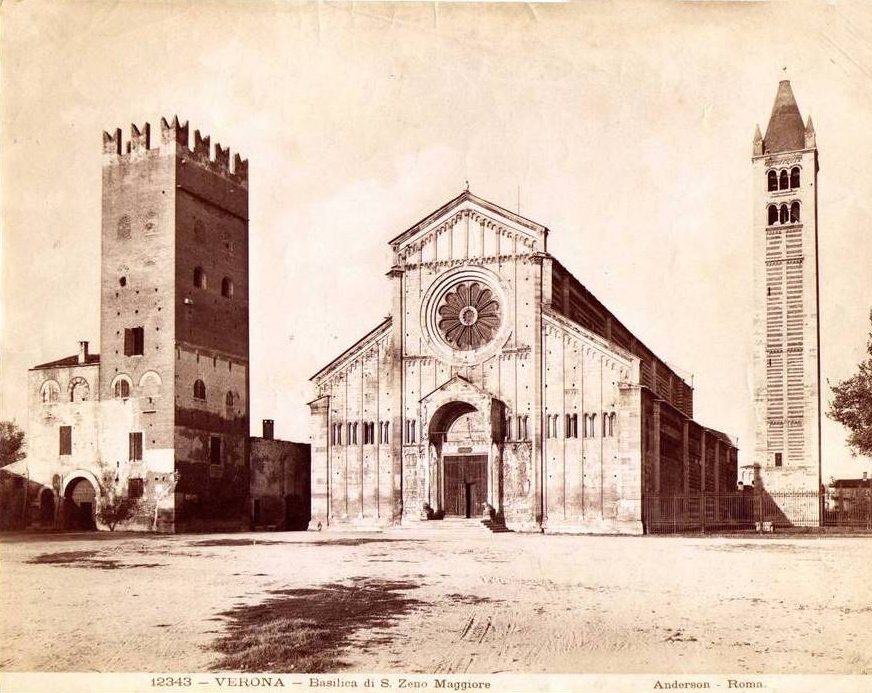
San Zeno in a photograph probably taken by James Anderson around the end of the 19th century.

The year 1838 was important in the history of the basilica, as the relics of the patron saint were discovered. The search had already begun with the transfer of the parish seat from San Procolo to San Zeno but, after many fruitless efforts, the bones were found on 22 March. However, it was decided to wait until after Easter for the complete exhumation, and on the following 20 April, in the presence of a large commission, the tomb was opened; Abbot Cesare Cavattoni left a detailed description of the event. (Note: Abbot Cesare Cavattoni reports that the bones were found "covered by a veil or garment of half-rotted silk that must have been of peacock-blue color"; on the skull, "remains of a cap with a gilded metal tuft or elongated tassel." Some yellow silk garments were also found, "checked with peacock-colored flowers, almost corroded by time." In.) The sacred remains were recomposed and placed in a gilded wooden urn with glass sides. Later, out of reverence, the bones were dressed in a solemn episcopal vestment of red silk embroidered in gold. In 1870 the central staircase was demolished and the old side staircases restored; at the same time, the rood screen separating the lower church from the chancel was rebuilt, with thirteen medieval statues placed on its balustrade.

Between 1927 and 1931, the then superintendent Alessandro Da Lisca directed a campaign whose main purpose was to reinstall the famous San Zeno Altarpiece, painted by Andrea Mantegna shortly after the mid-15th century, inside the church, after it had been moved to the civic museum during the First World War for safekeeping. At the end of 1930 a new high altar (the current one) was therefore built, adding a masonry structure on the old foundation block. In the following year, restoration of the apse and triumphal arch paintings began, along with the creation of new stained-glass windows and the reopening of the window on the southern side.

In 1938, on the centenary of the rediscovery of the patron saint's body, works were carried out in the apse of the crypt to improve hygienic conditions and to make it more dignified, as was also done with the tomb of Saint Zeno.

== Description ==
=== Exterior ===
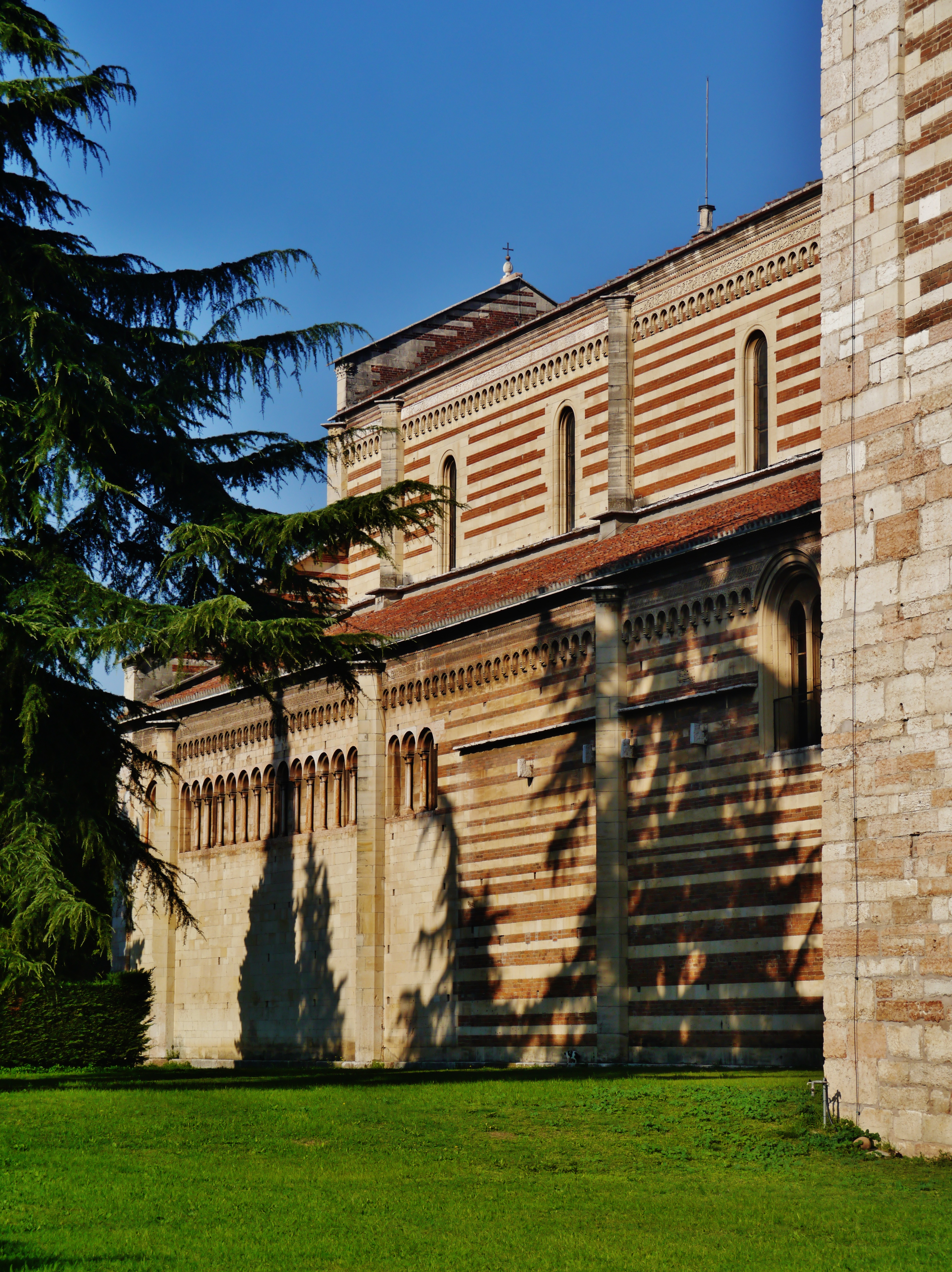
The side view, showing the different materials used: alternating brick and tuff in the earliest phase, and exclusively tuff closer to the façade, indicating a later enlargement.

The exterior of the Basilica of San Zeno represents one of the most harmonious and homogeneous examples of Romanesque architecture in northern Italy. The façade, built in tuff (similar to the cathedral and San Giovanni in Valle), dates to the last enlargement of the church in the early decades of the 12th century, although some elements, including the porch and the portal, belong to the earlier façade from which they were dismantled and reassembled here with appropriate adjustments. Famous is the large central rose window known as the "Wheel of Fortune" because of its symbolism. The southern side, however, appears to have been built in different periods and in as many styles. The complex is completed by an imposing and elegant bell tower and by the surviving buildings of the ancient Abbey of San Zeno, including the cloister, the chapel of St Benedict, and the abbey tower.

==== Façade ====
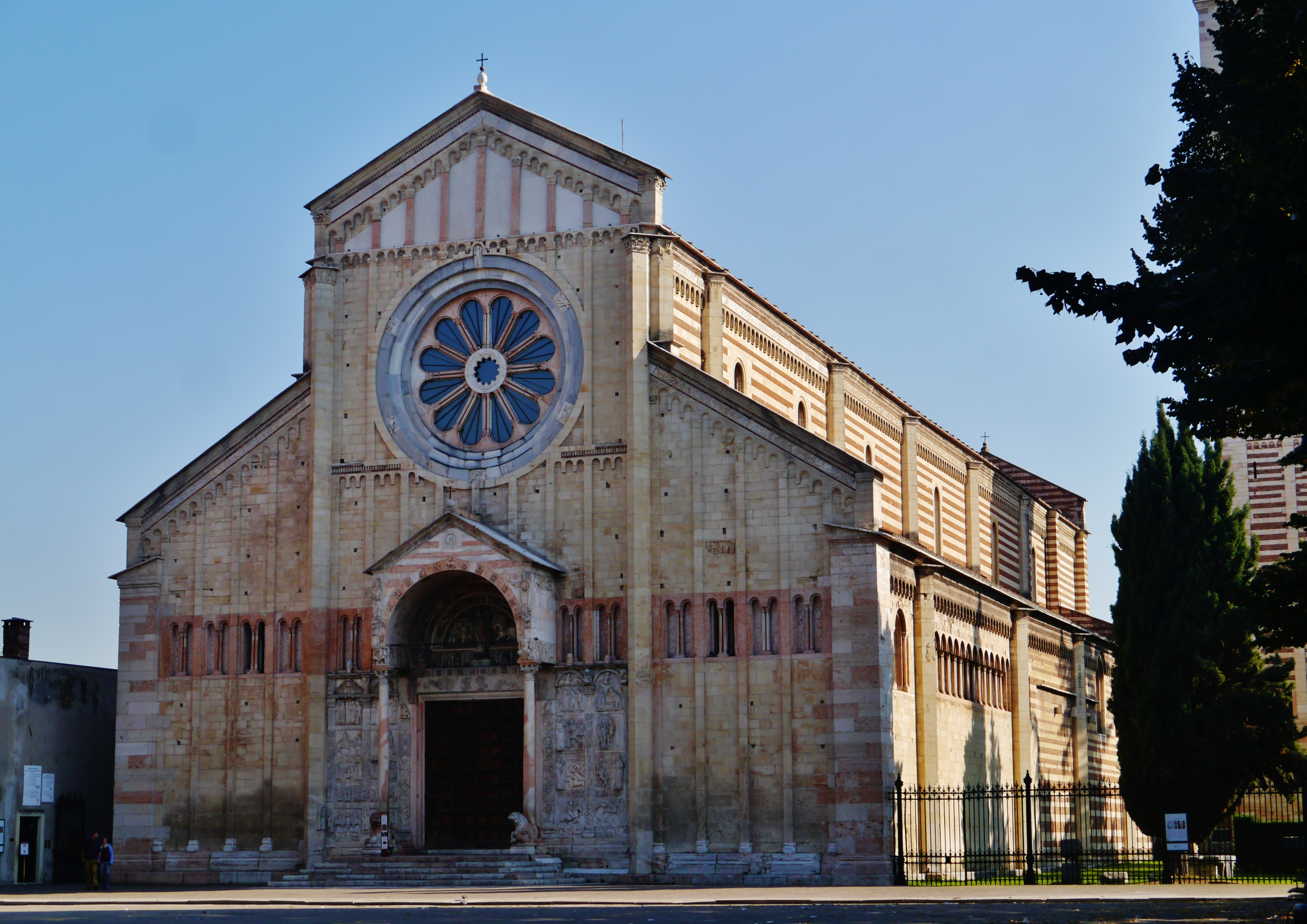
The façade of the Basilica of San Zeno.

Looking at the façade of the Basilica of San Zeno, one can distinguish its division into three parts, which mirror the layout of the interior spaces: the two side sections corresponding to the aisles, running from the edges to the large triangular pilaster strips, and the central section corresponding to the nave, lying between those pilaster strips. In the two side sections, the masonry is composed of blocks of tuff, while the gallery is built in the same stone as the southern side. On the cornice beneath the roofline, simple corbels support double-arched arcading carved with thin and low reliefs; above this is a frieze carved in Greek marble by Adamino, replacing the original.

On the right side of the façade, centrally placed just above the gallery of windows, is a small tuff bas-relief, stylistically datable to the early 12th century, in which three figures are crudely depicted standing among plants: in the center Christ with a cruciferous halo, to the left a saint, and to the right an abbot (now headless) with a crozier, offering the Redeemer the model of the church and the bell tower, completed with the belfry and with only two balconies on each side. It is possible that the model represents the church as it was designed in its extension, and indicates how the bell tower—begun in 1046 by Abbot Alberic—was intended to be built (or had already been completed).

In the central part of the façade, two additional zones can be distinguished: the lower one, extending from the ground up to the frame of the great rose window (the so-called "Wheel of Fortune"), which includes the portal and the porch, and the upper one, with the rose window and the pediment. The two zones are separated by a cornice of saw-tooth arches interrupted in the middle by the large Wheel. Like the side sections, the central one also ends with an arched cornice under the roofline and Adamino's frieze.

===== The rose window and the pediment =====
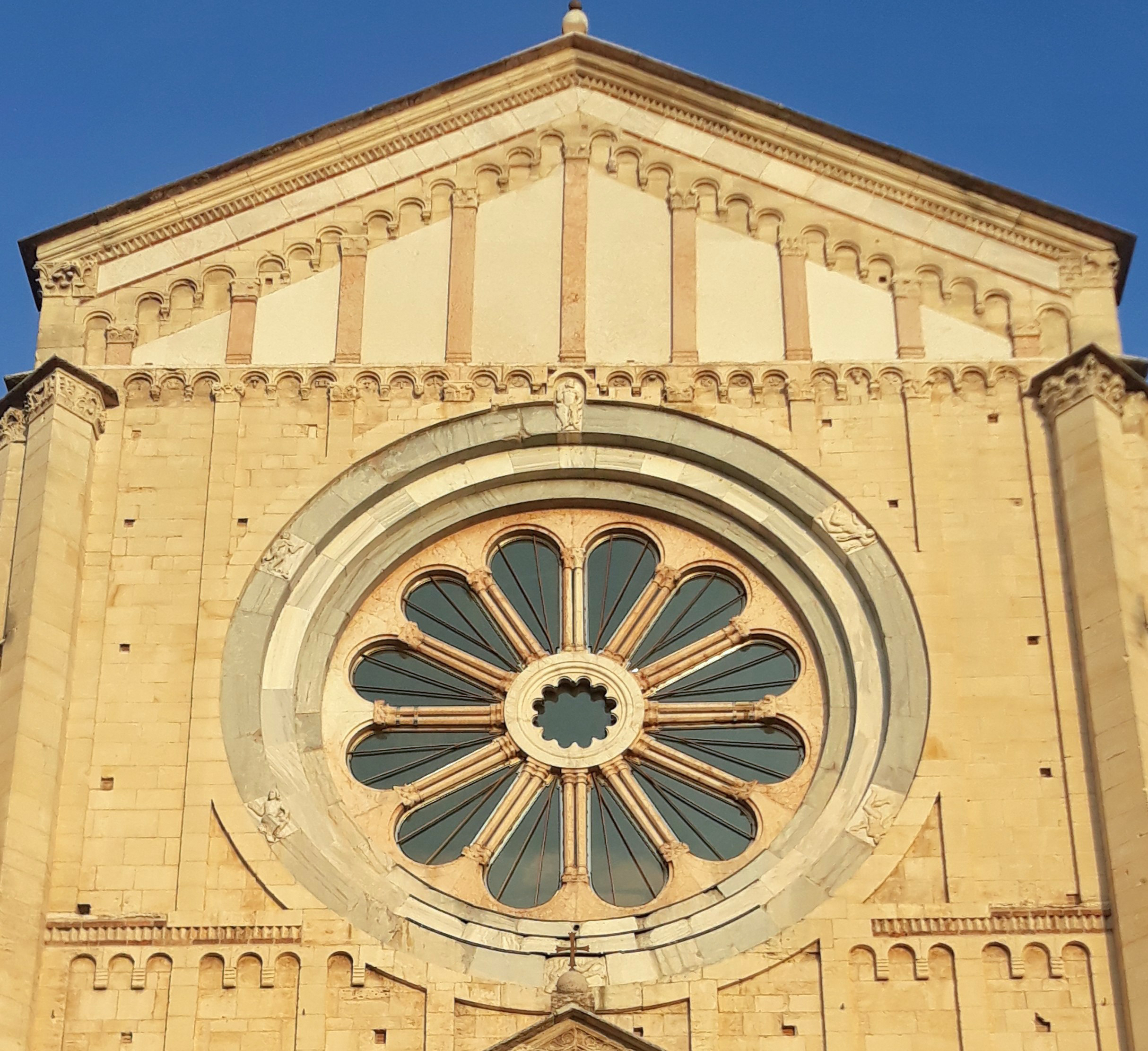
The rose window of the basilica created by Brioloto de Balneo. On the pediment of the gable there was once a Last Judgment depiction.

The rose window, the work of Brioloto de Balneo, is decorated with six statues representing the alternating phases of human life, that is, of Fortune (in the Latin sense of "destiny"), and for this reason it is known as the "Wheel of Fortune". Designed by Brioloto, it is divided into twelve sectors by as many pairs of hexagonal red marble shafts, adorned with capitals of foliage and animal figures. At the center is a circle, or hub, open inside and crowned with twelve lobes, while an equal number of larger lobes connect the paired capitals. Externally it is encircled by a three-stepped molding of white and blue marble, ending in a stone frame that links it with the plane of the pilaster strips. On the last marble step are rhythmically placed six sculpted figures in Greek marble representing the changes of destiny brought by Fortune: the two central ones, at the top and bottom, symbolize the highest prosperity and its utter loss, while the lateral ones show the intermediate passages—on the right the fall from happiness to misery, and on the left the return to a fortunate state. On the hub of the Wheel runs an inscription explaining the symbolic meaning: on the outside, «En ego Fortuna moderor mortalibus una. / Elevo, depono, bona cunctis vel mala dono.», while on the inside, «Induo nudatos, denudo veste paratos; / in me confidit si quis, derisus abibit».

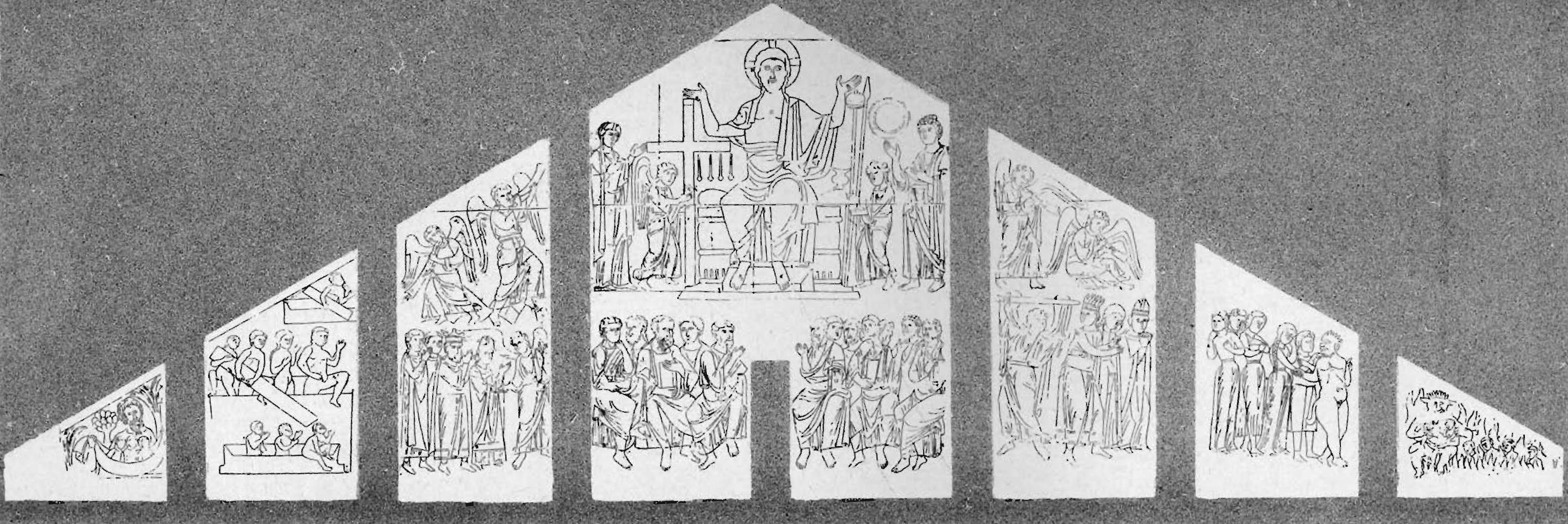
A reproduction by Giuseppe Gerola of the Last Judgment graffito once present on the façade's pediment.

The gable, marking the exterior top of the central nave, is in white marble, thus contrasting with the rest of the church façade, built in tuff and stone, and with the seven pink marble pilaster strips running across it. In 1905 Massimiliano Ongaro discovered graffiti on the pediment depicting a large Last Judgment. The historian Giuseppe Gerola reproduced it in plaster cast and illustrated it in the Bollettino d'arte del Ministero della Pubblica Istruzione. The work, attributed to Brioloto and Adamino da San Giorgio, is one of the earliest and most important Veronese depictions of the Last Judgment. At its center was Christ enthroned with two angels beside him, Mary and St John the Evangelist. Below were the Apostles, and to the sides the elect and the damned. On the side of the elect, Abraham holds them in his bosom; angels carry a king, a bishop, and two saints to heaven; and the dead rise from their tombs to the sound of angelic trumpets. On the side of the damned, angels drive them away with swords and sound trumpets of justice. Among the damned were a bishop, a king, and a woman. Five other women follow, one of them pulling the devil's beard. In the background, flames burn the damned while a devil punishes them.

===== The porch =====
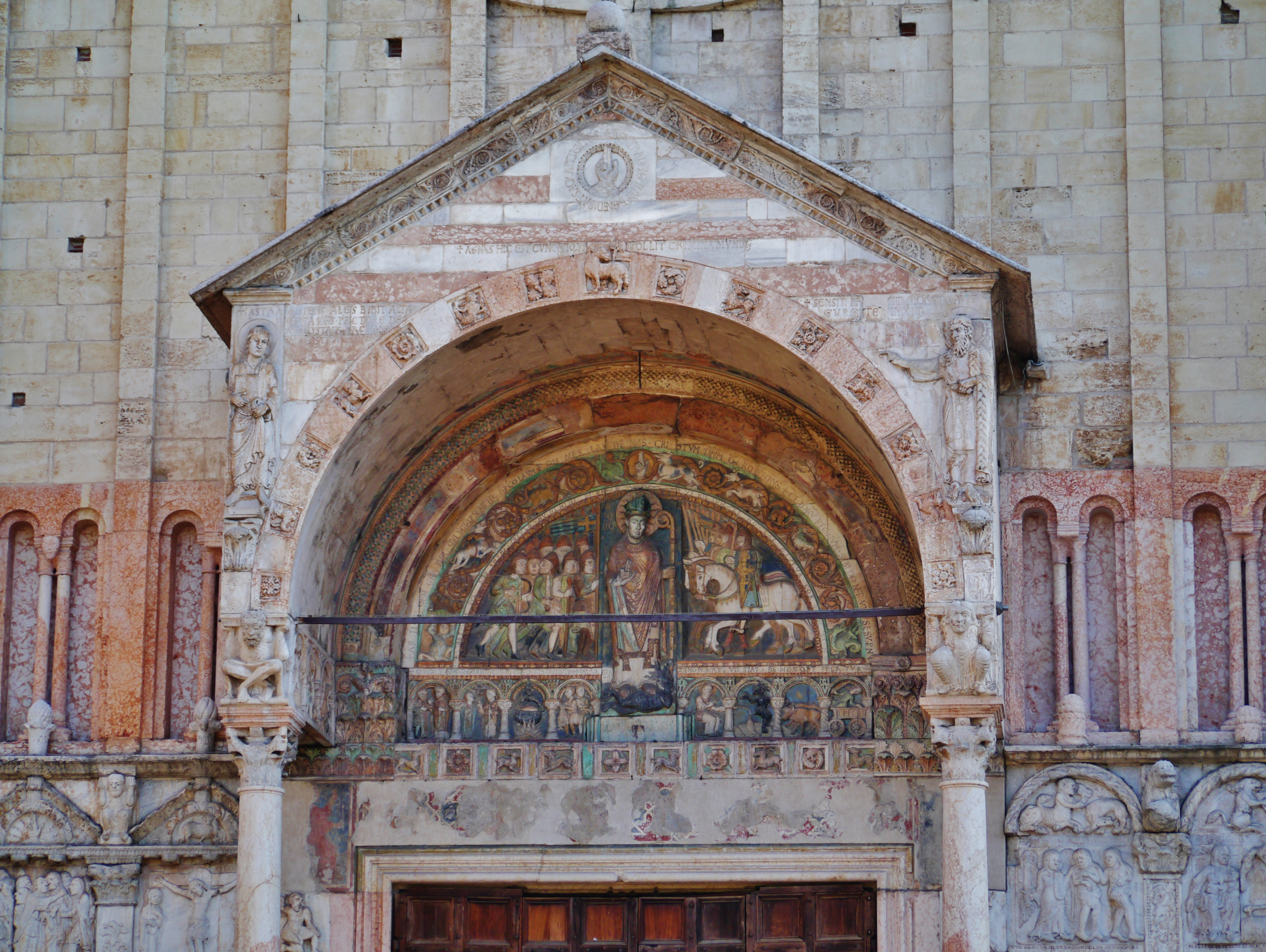
The porch by master Niccolò. The scene in the lunette, created in 1138, attests to the birth of the medieval commune of Verona.

The porch is signed by master Niccolò and was created in the 12th century, although it is likely that later alterations compromised its harmony. It appears in a very simple form, without splay, limited to covering, with a single-gabled canopy, part of the five small pilaster strips of the façade, and leaving on each side, before the large pilaster strip, a resting area with two blind mullioned windows of the gallery. The canopy is supported by two crouching telamons, upon which, as ideal continuations of the same columns, are carved bas-reliefs of the saints John the Baptist and John the Evangelist. On the arch stand out the Lamb and the hand of God in blessing, with a Latin inscription which, translated, reads: «May the right hand of God bless the peoples who enter to ask for holy things». At the base, two stylophoric lions represent the guardians of the church, those who prevent the entry of unworthy souls (they are shown pinning down intruders beneath their paws), while the two columns symbolize "law" and "faith".

Within the porch coexist three types of representations: sacred ones relating to the life of the saint, political ones relating to the birth of the commune, and profane ones represented by the months and their related trades. Inside, in the lunette, there is a bas-relief depicting the Consecration of the Veronese Commune, which, in addition to its artistic value, is also an important historical document attesting to the birth of the Veronese medieval commune in 1138, the date of the work's creation. In it, the patron saint Zeno appears in the center while trampling on the devil, almost symbolically sealing the pact between the milites (the feudal aristocracy, represented by the knights on the right) and the pedites (the prosperous commoners, the emerging bourgeoisie). To the right of St Zeno stand representatives of the Veronese nobility and merchant families on horseback (the equites), and to the left the representatives of the people, the armed infantrymen (the pedites). In the scene, St Zeno hands a banner to the Veronese, a kind of investiture of sacred derivation. The relief is accompanied by a Latin inscription, which can be translated as: «The Bishop gives the people the banner worthy of being defended / St Zeno gives the standard with a serene heart».

Below the lunette, Niccolò carved bas-reliefs representing the miracles performed by St Zeno: the exorcism of the daughter of Gallienus, possessed by a demon; a man saved while falling into the Adige with his cart; and finally the fish that St Zeno the fisherman gave away. On the inner and outer corbels of the porch are depicted the twelve months of the year, starting from March, with the typical works of each month. The twelve months reflect the twelve sectors of the Wheel of Fortune and the rotation and repetition of a cycle, the months and the seasons that endlessly follow one another.

===== The high reliefs at the sides of the porch =====
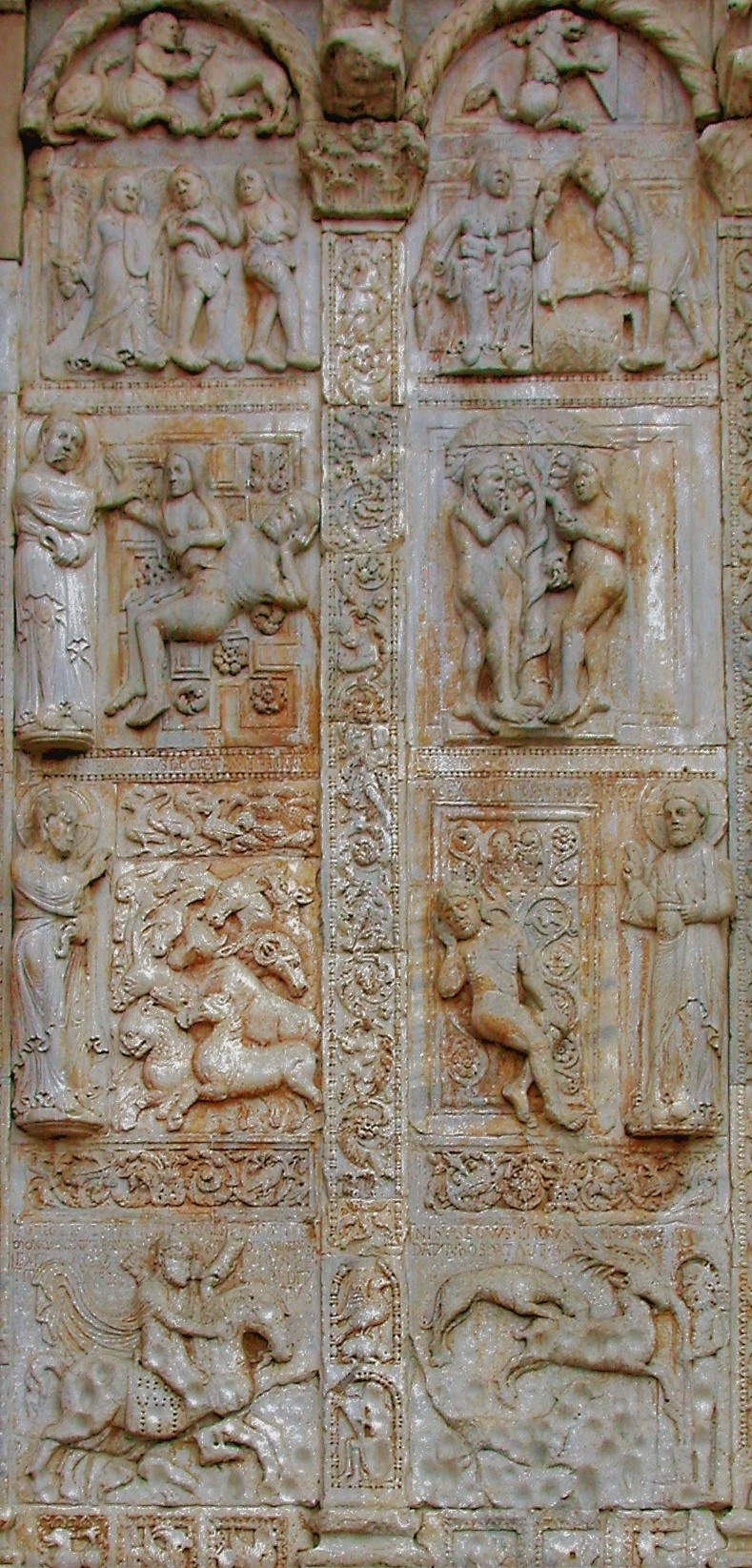
The high reliefs to the right of the portal with scenes from Genesis and of King Theodoric the Great, the work of master Niccolò and his assistants.

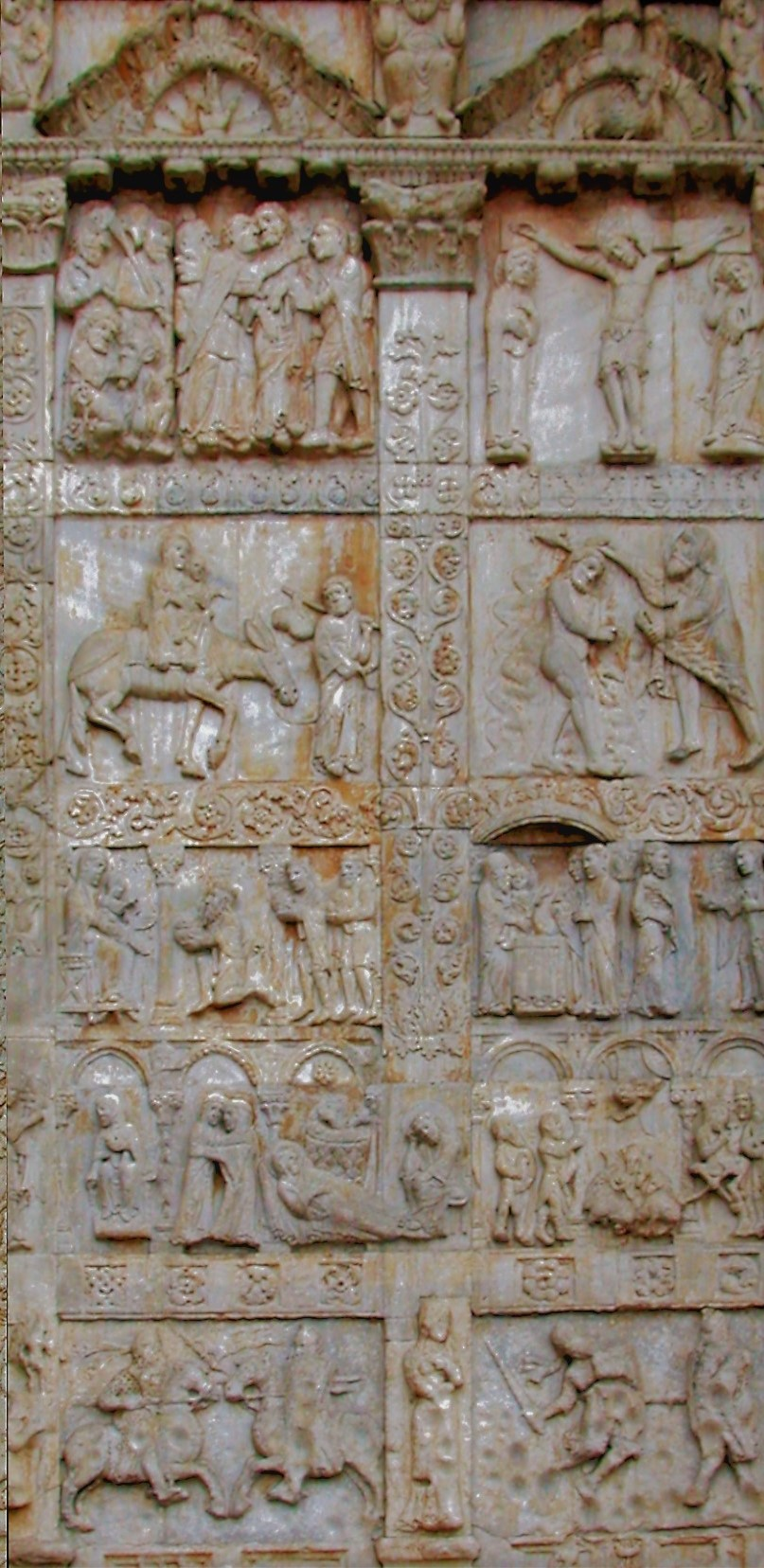
The high reliefs to the left of the portal with scenes from the New Testament, the work of master Guglielmo.

On either side of the porch and the portal are 18 high reliefs dating back to the 12th century, ten on the left and eight on the right, arranged in pairs under small arches and separated by a small pilaster strip, itself decorated with vegetal motifs and zoomorphic figures. The bas-reliefs on the left are attributed to master Guglielmo and his assistants, while those on the right belong to master Niccolò and his workshop.

The scenes in the bas-reliefs include both sacred subjects, taken from the New and Old Testament, and profane ones, centered on Theodoric the Great. More precisely, on the right master Niccolò carved, from top to bottom and left to right: the Expulsion from Paradise, the First Parents, the Birth of Eve, the Original Sin, God Creates the Animals, the Creation of Adam, the Hunt of Theodoric, and finally the Damnation of Theodoric. Above the figure of Adam, on the right side, is an inscription identifying master Niccolò as the author: «Hic exempla trai possunt lauds Nicolai» (that is, «Here one may find proofs of the praise of Niccolò»); however, the difference between the very high quality of the figures depicting the life of Theodoric and the simpler sacred representations suggests that only the former were by Niccolò himself, while the latter appear to be the work of stonecutters from his workshop.

On the left, by contrast, the style is much more uniform, and thus it is generally believed that master Guglielmo may have been the sole author, as attested by an inscription placed on the upper frame: «Qui legis ista pie natum placato Marie salvet in etrum qi sculpsit sita Guillelmum. Intrates concti sucurrant huic pereunti» (that is, «You who read these words will piously appease the Son of Mary, who may eternally save Guglielmo who carved these works. May all who enter help this man who would perish»). The author represented, again from top to bottom and left to right: the Arrest of Christ, the Crucifixion, the Flight into Egypt, the Baptism of Christ, the Magi, the Presentation at the Temple, Joseph Warned by an Angel, the Annunciation, the Nativity, the Annunciation to the Shepherds, the Duel between Theodoric and Odoacer, and the Duel of Infantrymen. The art historian Adolfo Venturi identifies master Guglielmo with Wiligelmo, the celebrated author of the bas-reliefs of the Modena Cathedral, while Carlo Cipolla considered him a pupil of Niccolò, observing the similarities between the two styles; others instead have proposed that both sculptors were disciples of Wiligelmo.

Finally, still on the left side, one can see on the large pilaster strip another relief depicting a female figure inside an arch bearing the inscription «MATALIANA». While scholars agree that this work cannot be attributed either to Niccolò or to Guglielmo, there is no certainty as to the identity of the figure. Some have suggested she might have been a benefactress of the abbey, while others have seen in the name a reference to Matilda of Tuscany, who in 1073 donated some properties to the monastery. Alessandro Da Lisca, on the other hand, proposed Adelaide of Burgundy, wife of Otto I, believing that this figure is linked to the nearby duel scene, which, according to Da Lisca, represents her husband fighting against Berengar II.

===== The portal =====
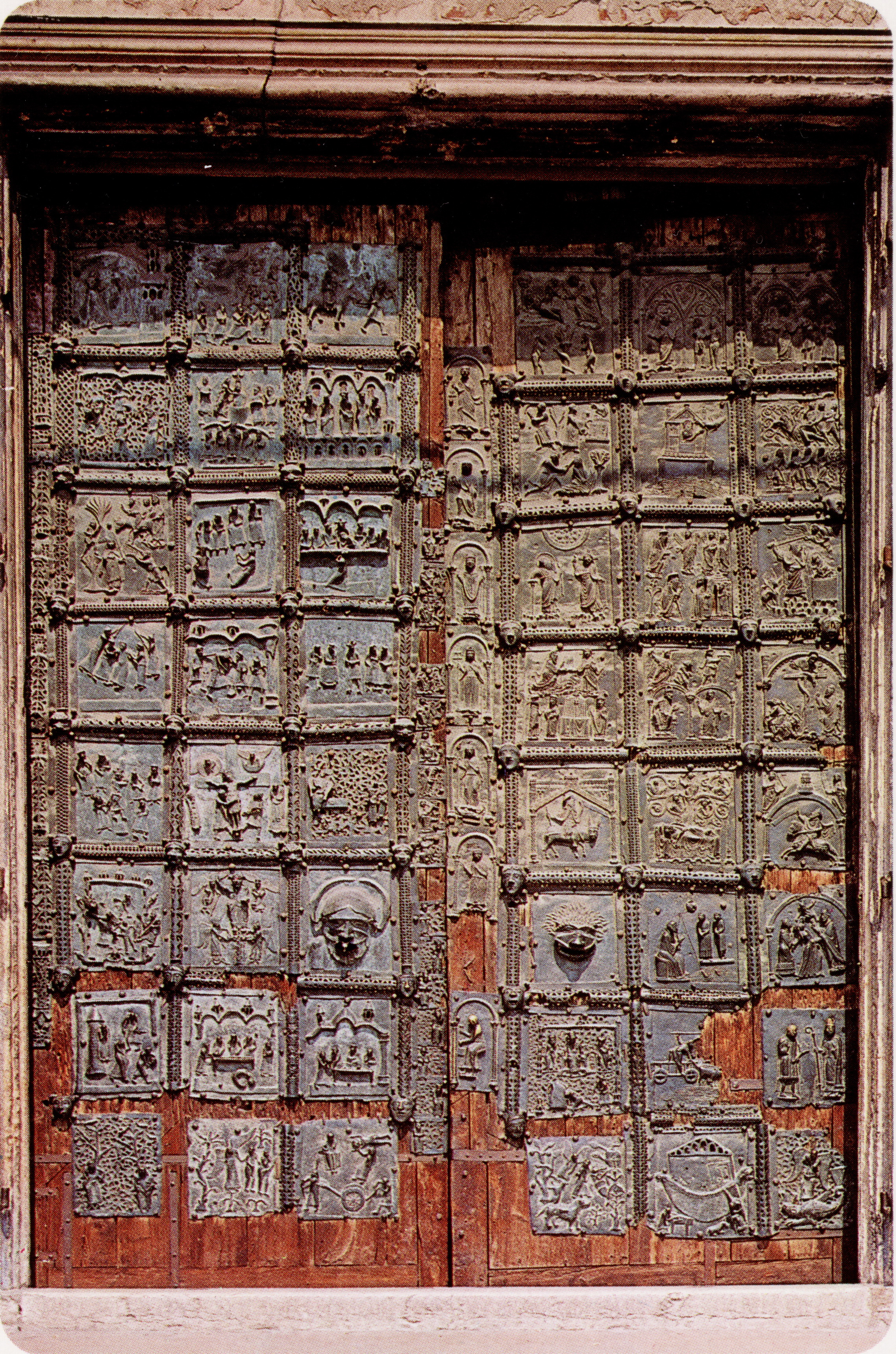
The church's bronze portal.

The main entrance of the basilica is closed by a celebrated bronze portal made at different times, not precisely determined, by various master founders. It consists of a total of 73 bronze panels of various sizes fixed to wooden doors with large iron nails and arranged without apparent symmetry. Of these, the 48 largest ones (24 on each door leaf) measure about 56×52 cm, 42 of which depict scenes from the Old and New Testament, 4 show the miracles of Saint Zeno, and 2 serve as handles; on 7 smaller rectangular panels (about 50×25 cm), each contains a single figure placed between two small columns and a superimposed arch; 18 are even smaller and square (about 17×17 cm), representing horned figures and Virtues; finally, there are 7 other rectangular ones (about 45×17 cm), openwork in the form of a conical tower placed on a gallery, which serve as frames for the larger panels. The larger panels are neatly distributed in the central part of the door leaf, with each of the two leaves organized into three vertical and eight horizontal bands.

Each panel was cast separately in small molds, a simple production method that made it easier to correct mistakes, different from the technique used in Germany, where it was more common to proceed with a single casting. The current wooden leaves are of larch and measure 3.95×4.81 meters; they were most likely made during the extension of the church completed in 1138.

As already noted, the panels are certainly the work of at least two different artists from different periods, more probably three. All scholars, however, agree in assigning to the so-called "first master", datable to around the first half of the 11th century, the Old Testament panels on the left door leaf, except for one New Testament scene and three others of the same cycle on the lower part of the right leaf. Regarding these panels, Alessandro Da Lisca observed that, although the figurative details are rendered in a «rough and schematic» way, «the whole composition is admirable for its decorative effect and for its vis drammatica». According to several authors, this first master (identified by some with a certain Stefano Lagarino) created the panels to decorate the entire portal of the earlier, smaller church, and that later, with the enlargement of the building and the portal, they were dismantled and partly reused, integrated with others by additional founders to be applied to the new, larger leaves; this theory would explain the evident disorder both from an iconological perspective and from the purely aesthetic juxtaposition of the various pieces.

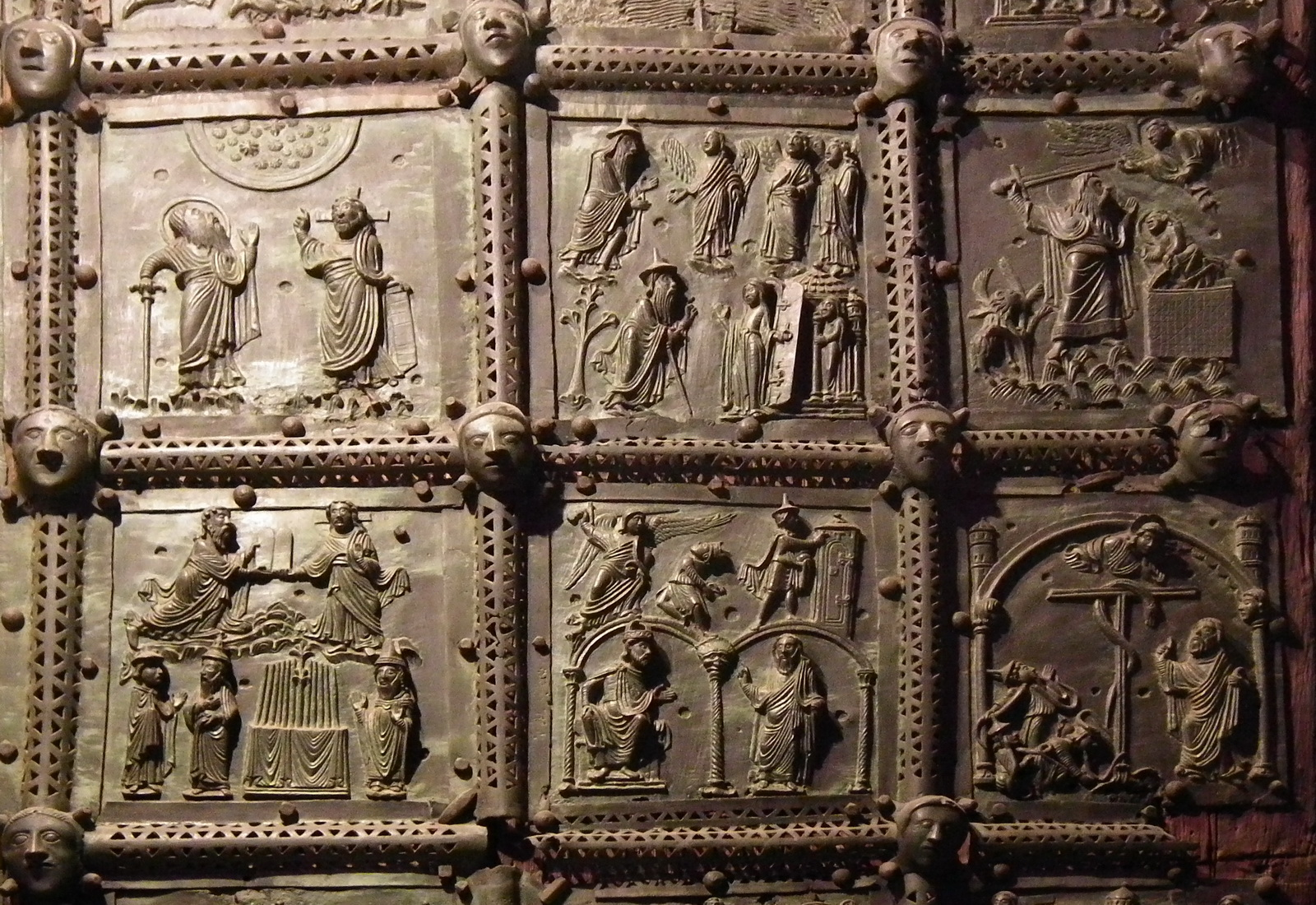
Detail of some bronze panels composing the portal.

Da Lisca also identifies a "second master" to whom he attributes the panels with scenes of the New Testament, who, compared to the first, «shows remarkable progress, though achieving less intensity and effectiveness in expressing the sense of life». According to Simeoni, this master was active in the time of Niccolò and Guglielmo, while Trecca places him between the end of the 11th and the beginning of the 12th century. Finally, many scholars note the presence of at least a "third master", who may have worked between the late 12th and early 13th century, responsible for three scenes of the life of Saint Zeno on the right leaf.

Over the years the portal has attracted the attention of many art historians who have analyzed its style in relation to earlier works; Pietro Toesca defined it as «German art of the late 12th century», a characterization accepted also by others, such as Arslan, who drew parallels with the medieval portal of Hildesheim Cathedral. Despite appearing today disorganized, damaged, and a victim of time and theft, the portal is nevertheless generally considered one of the most interesting examples of this kind in Italy.

==== Southern side ====
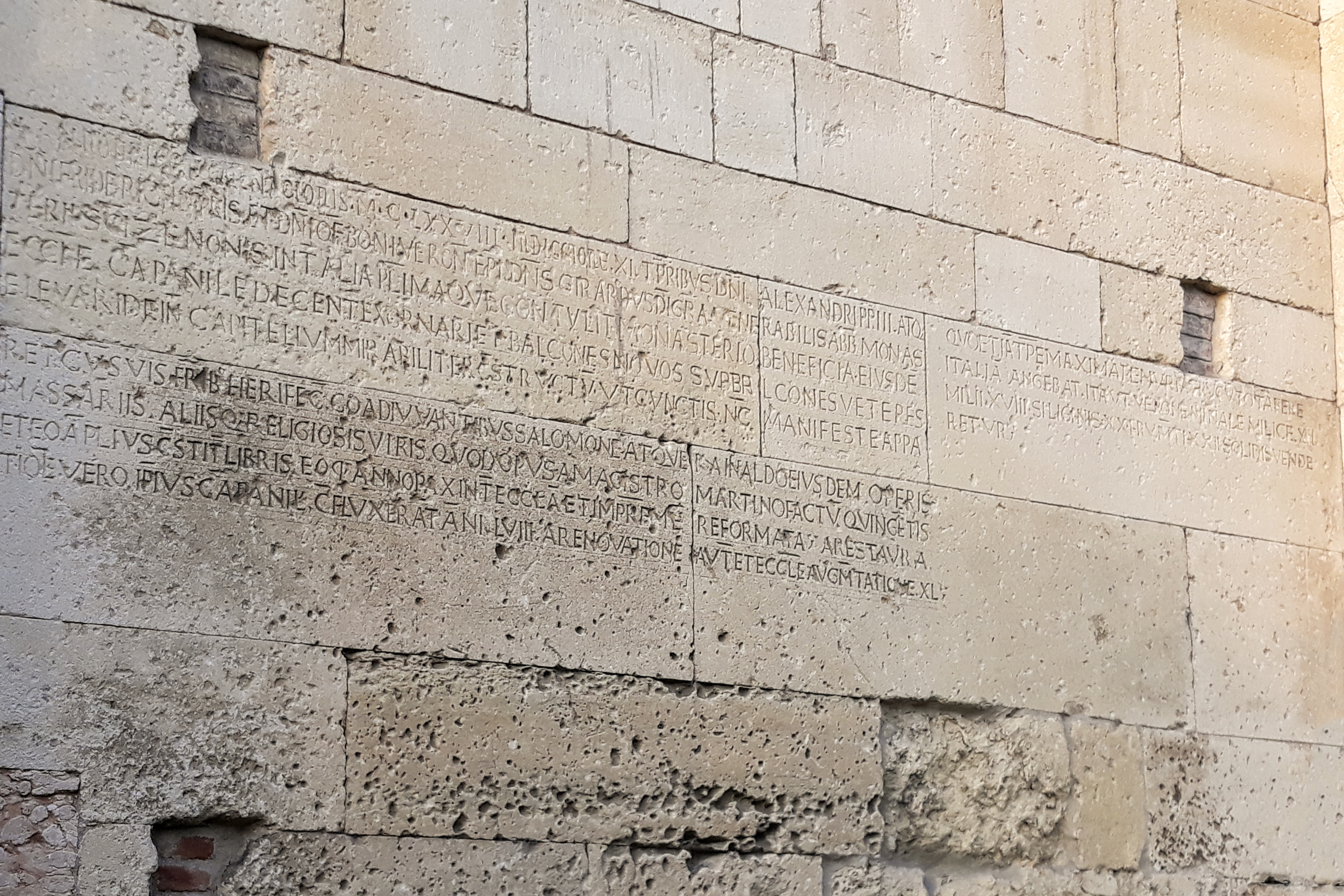
The inscription located along the southern side.

The southern side features various construction techniques and architectural styles that allow us to identify the different phases of the church's construction and expansion. The oldest part, completed around 1120, is likely the southern side, entirely made of brick: this includes the small apse and extends to the buttress.

The intermediate masonry section, on the other hand, alternates courses of tuff blocks with courses of brick: this technique gives the wall a bichrome banded appearance of white and red typical of Veronese Romanesque, also found in other churches such as Santo Stefano. Similarly, the side of the central nave appears with bichrome bands, though more uniform. The end of this intervention should be dated to 1138.

The last section, the one closest to the facade, is entirely made of tuff and is believed to date back to the final phase of the church, when the 13th-century expansion directed by Adamino and Brioloto took place, bringing the building to its present size. Also on the eastern side, near the facade, a long inscription celebrates Abbot Gerardo, patron of the expansion works, and a certain Martino, master mason. Just above this inscription, inside a niche, there is a fresco depicting the Madonna with Child in half-figure, created around the second half of the 12th century and poorly restored in the 20th century.

==== Apse area ====
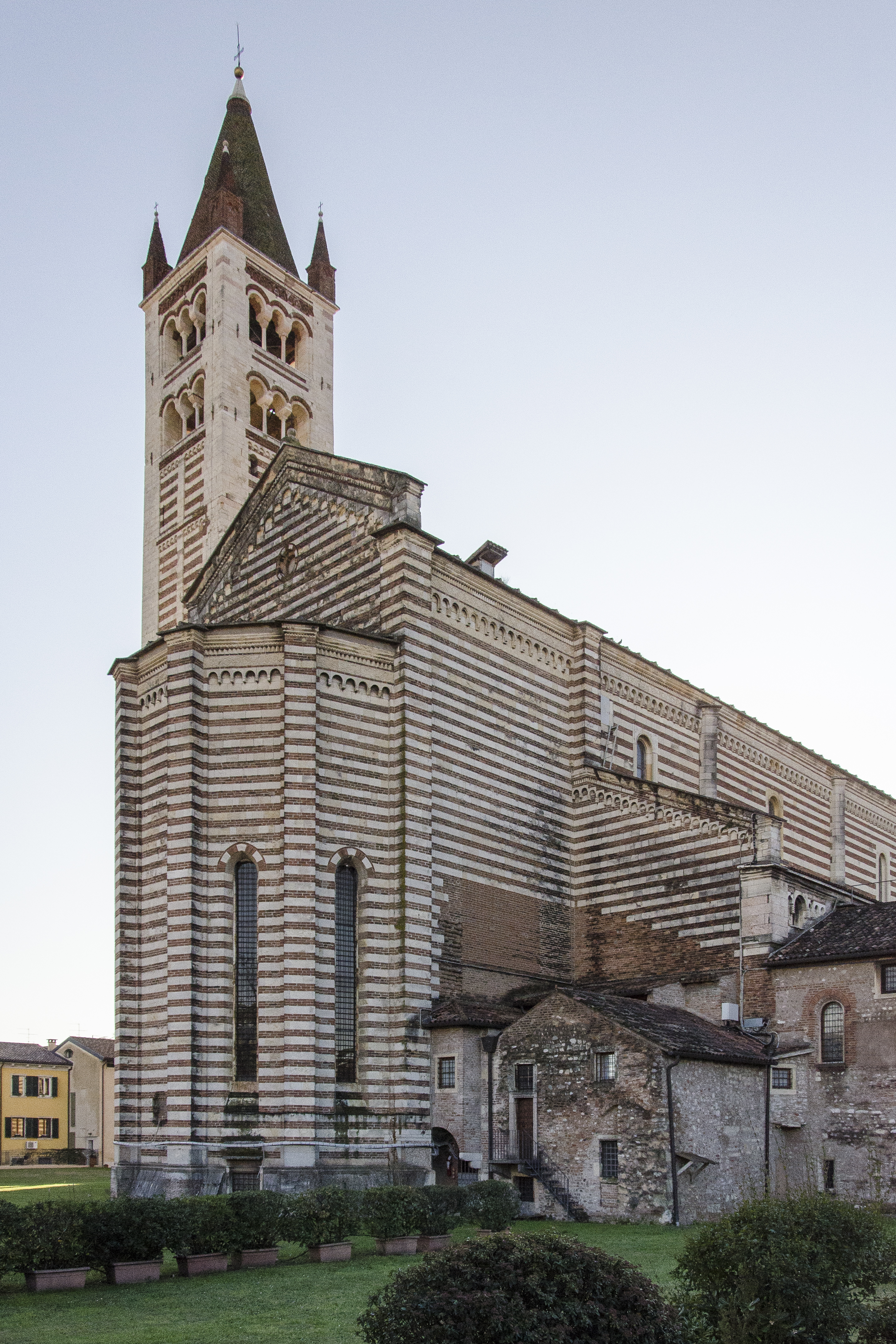
The image shows the main apse, rebuilt in Gothic style, while the one on the right has been incorporated into buildings attached to the church.

San Zeno Basilica ends to the north with two apses, a smaller one on the left and a larger one in the center, while the right apse was incorporated into the old convent buildings and is visible only internally. The two externally visible apses are clearly from different periods: according to historian Luigi Simeoni, the smaller one dates back to the 9th-century construction, during the time of Raterio and Pipino, while the central one was later rebuilt, excluding any further intermediate modification. Although some elements (Note: Inside the main apse is the coat of arms of the Emilei abbots (at San Zeno between 1399 and 1430) on the keystone of the ribbed vaults and on the triumphal arch pillars; also the presence of the Lion of Saint Mark, always on the pillars, suggested that the apse renovation should be placed after the dedication of Verona to Venice in 1405. In.) suggested that the current main apse dates to the time of the Emilei abbots, the discovery of the building journal allowed the renovation works to be dated between 1386 and 1398, carried out thanks to the commitment of abbots Ottonello, Jacopo Pasti, and Pietro Paolo Cappelli.

Externally, the smaller apse appears simple and mainly built of bricks, while the larger one presents the classic Veronese Romanesque scheme of alternating tuff and brick courses, masking its typically Gothic style, which instead emerges clearly in certain internal elements, such as the triumphal arch with a pointed arch, the ribbed vault with projecting ribs from the square bay, and the tall windows ending with pointed arches.

==== Bell tower ====
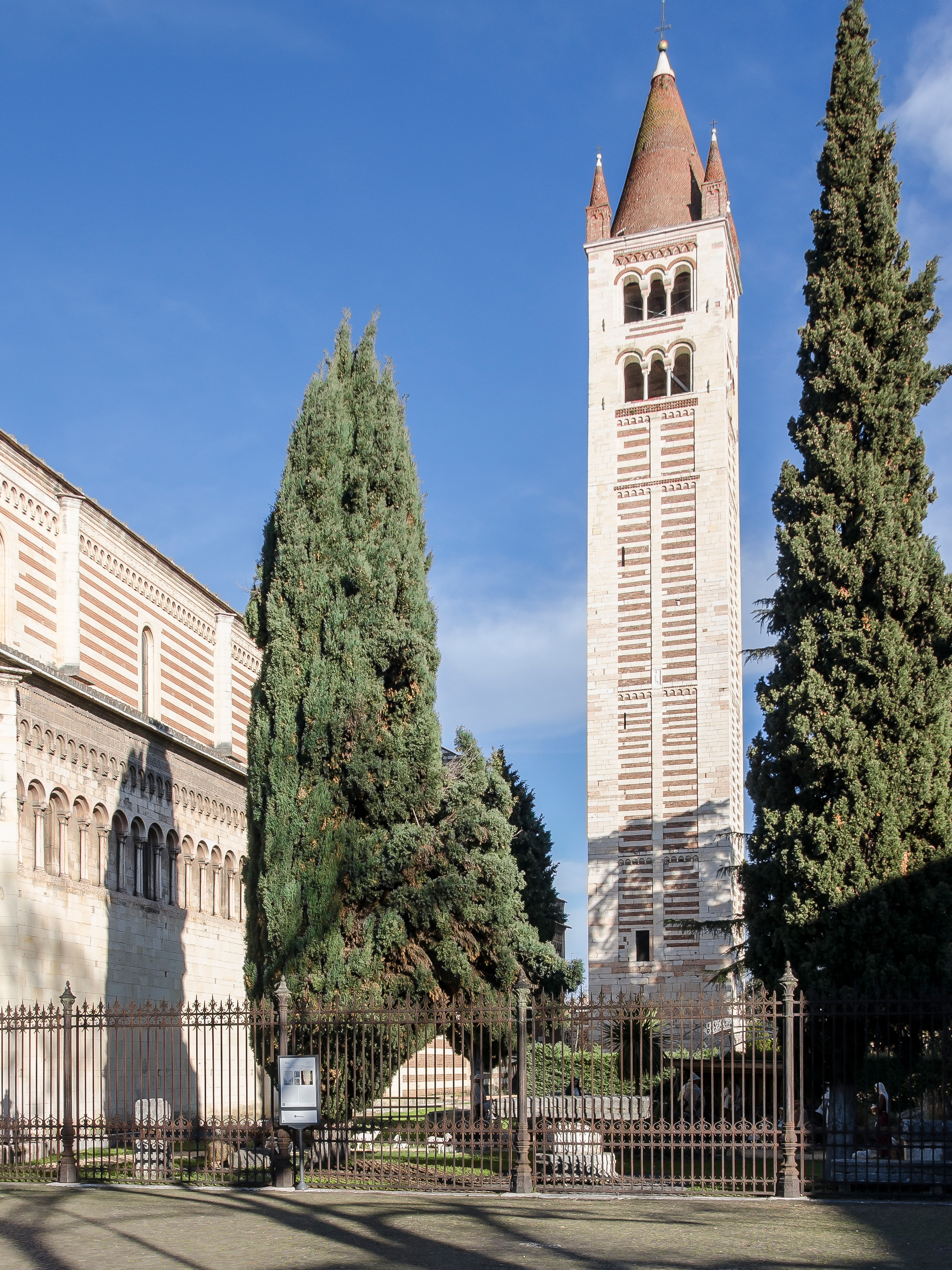
The bell tower seen from Piazza San Zeno.

The current bell tower, isolated from the church and built above an earlier one dating back to the 8th–9th centuries, is the result of a long construction history. From an inscription on it, it is known that construction and restoration works began in 1045 with Abbot Alberico; about twenty years later, at the abbot's death in 1067, it had reached roughly half of its current height. Its completion occurred around 1178 thanks to "Master Martino", commissioned by Abbot Gerardo. It was therefore a long construction project interrupted only by the earthquake of 1117, followed by the 1120 restoration.

It rests on an imposing plinth of rectangular plan made of solid stone blocks: the east and west sides are 8.25 meters long, the north and south sides measure 8.23 meters, while the plinth height is about 7 meters from ground level. The use of stone continues above the base, both at the corners of the shaft and on the central pilaster of each face, while in the space between, alternating courses of tuff and brick are used, repeating the technique already employed in the church's perimeter walls, giving it the characteristic Veronese Romanesque bichromy.

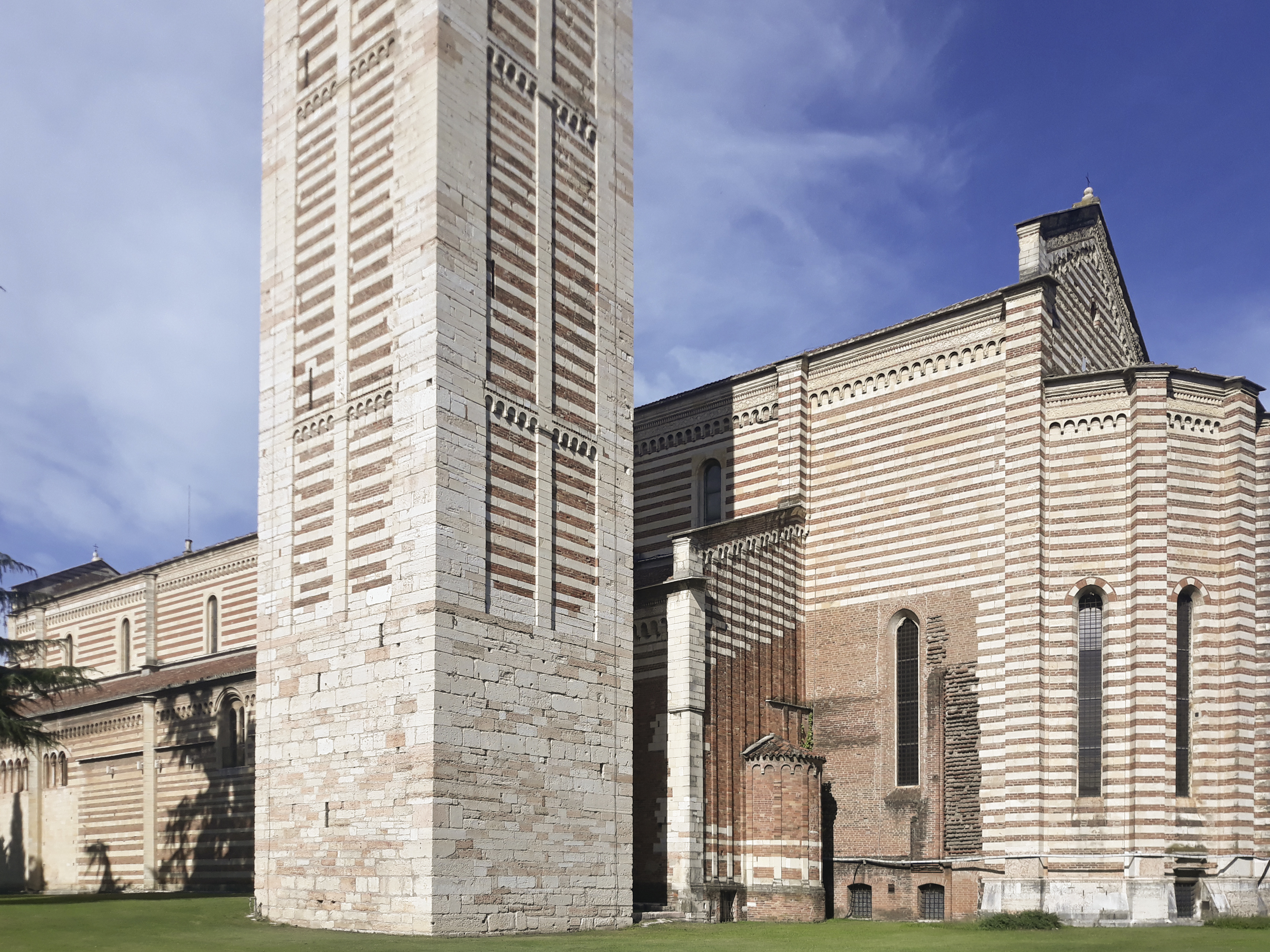
The stone plinth of the bell tower.

Each face is horizontally divided into four unequal orders by cornices with small tuff arch brackets and overlapping brick sawtooth courses; of these cornices, the first and second have a single sawtooth band between tuff courses, the third two, and the fourth four. On the western side, above the plinth, there is a rectangular entrance door, similar to those of other contemporary bell towers. The same side shows several spolia elements: above the second cornice, on the central pilaster, there is a Roman sculpture of a standing man wearing a Phrygian cap; higher up is a small Roman head carved in marble; another Roman sculpture, depicting a winged genius, is located above the first cornice on the central pilaster of the southern facade.

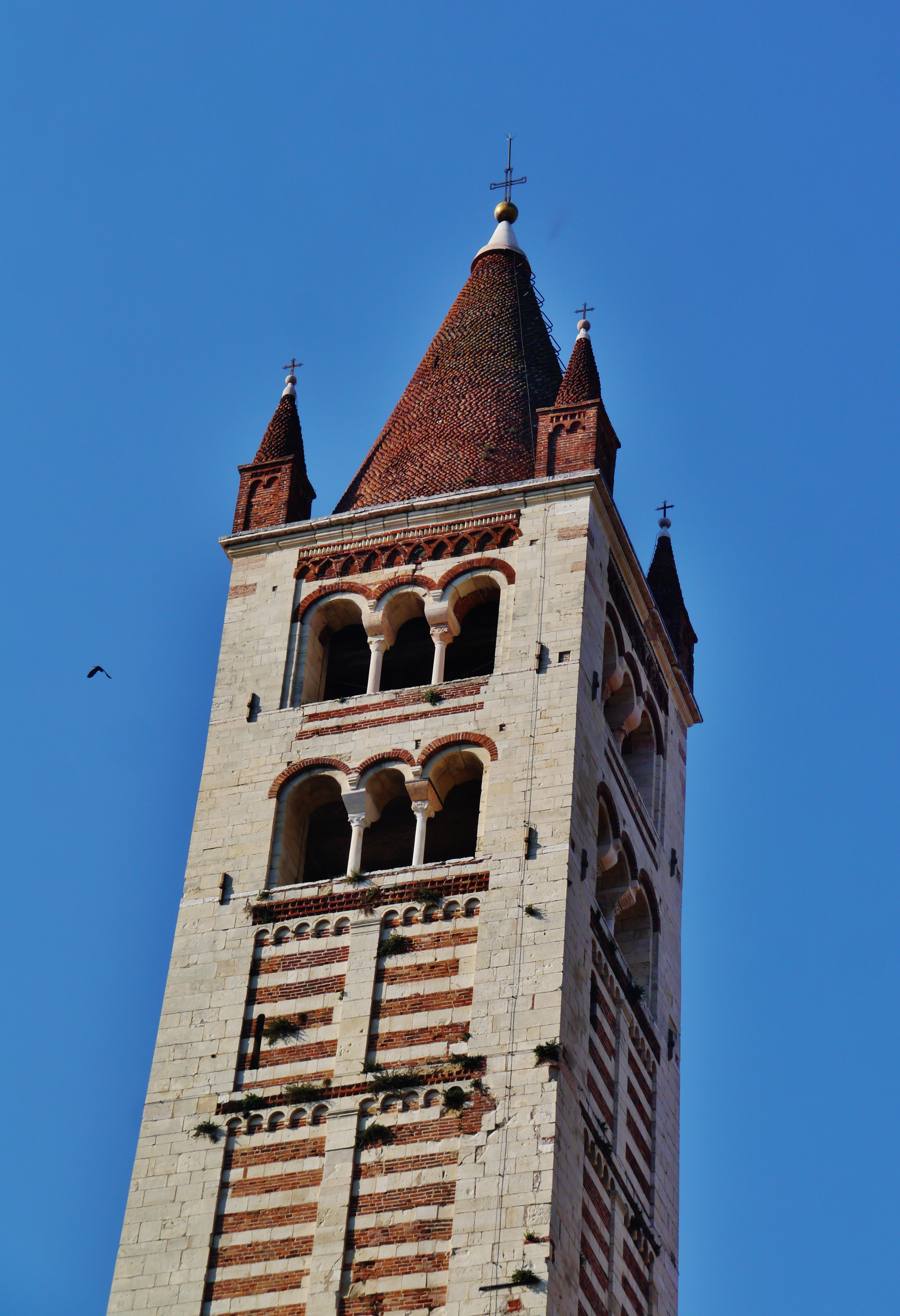
Detail of the belfry, featuring two orders of triforas.

The belfry has two superimposed orders of trifora windows on each side. The central opening of the trifora is slightly smaller than the two lateral ones, and all are round arch in tuff blocks with brick archivolts of interlaced arches. All columns, capitals, and abaci have simple forms, some decorated with leaves and almost all with a central flower. In the lower order of the belfry, the columns have no bases except one, and all capitals are of Greek marble, except for one jasper column. Four of the eight abaci are Greek marble. Since 1498 the belfry has housed 6 bells, the largest cast in 1423 weighing nearly a ton, over one meter in diameter, sounding G♭. Of the older bells, only the small octagonal one called "del figar" remains; the other two contemporary bells were melted by Abbot Rezzonico in 1755, but the inscriptions were preserved by Giovanni Battista Biancolini (Note: The first read: «ANNO AB INCARNATIONE DOMINI M.C. QUADRAGESIMO NONO REGNANTE CONRADO IMPERATORE. ALDO PRESBITER» The second: «IN NOMINE DOMINI NOSTRI IESU XRISTI EGO GISLIMERUS HOC OPUS FECI» In.) which tell us they were made in 1149 by the founder Gislimerio on the commission of Priest Aldo.

The shaft ends with smooth moldings of tuff. Finally, four pinnacles rise on its corners, all of brick with double arches on the face. The large central pinecone is also entirely brick; its upper half was rebuilt because, according to the Annales Veronenses Antiqui, on March 31, 1242, it was struck by lightning causing a partial collapse.

Entering the bell tower through the door on the church-facing side leads to a dark first room covered by a ribbed vault, which once may have served as a prison. Climbing the first stairs, which rest like the upper ones on flying arches, one reaches the first floor where the narrowing of the walls creates a wider room than the one below. The tower walls are core masonry, meaning built with a concrete fill between the two outer layers. While the external facing was covered with intact bricks for finer appearance, inside it alternates with fragmentary tuff blocks. As you ascend, tuff blocks decrease and bricks increase. In the lower belfry, older marbles are reused.

==== Cloister ====
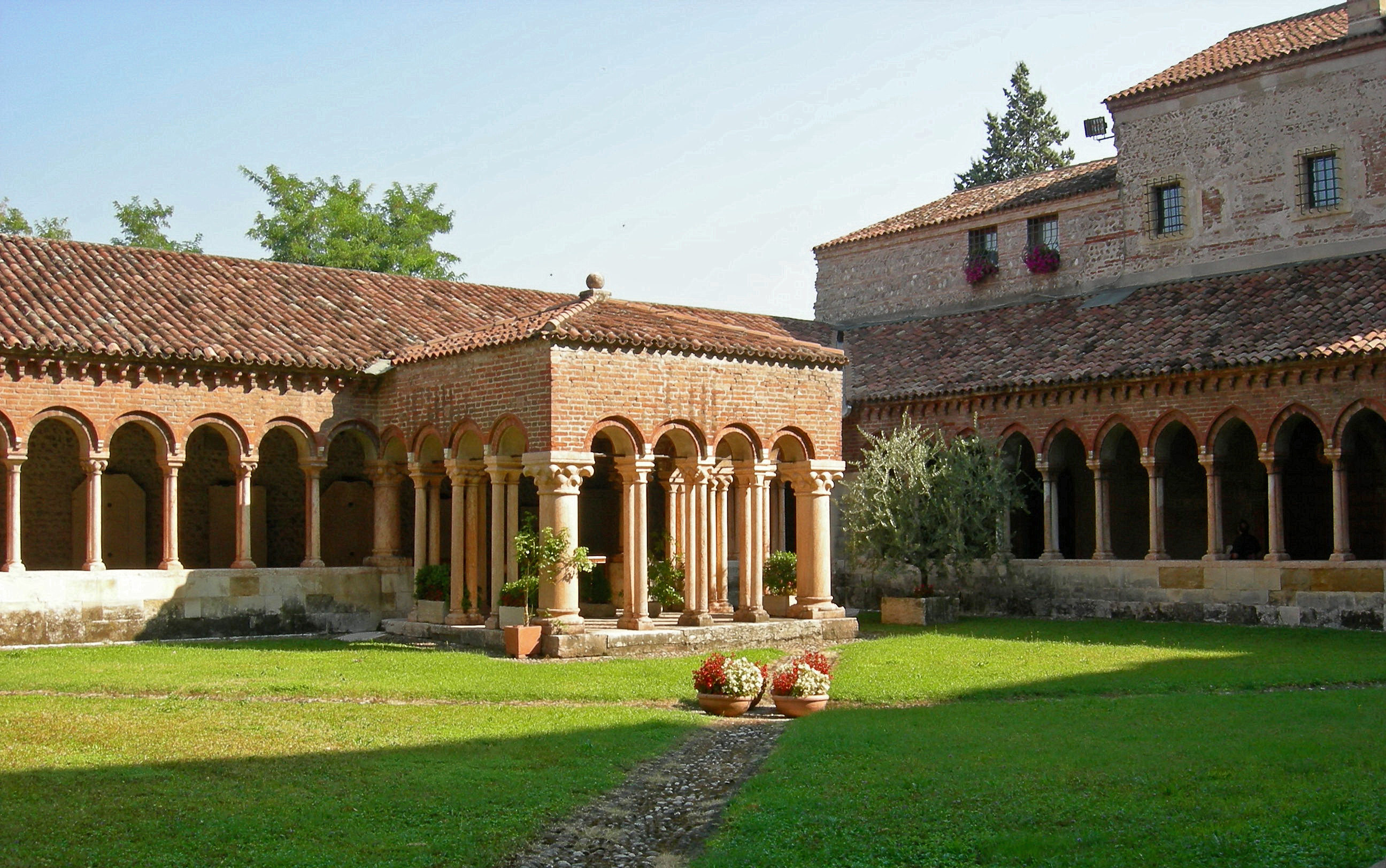
Cloister of the ancient abbey of San Zeno, with the projecting niche where the well was once located.

The first record of the presence of the cloister, part of the abbey of San Zeno, dates back to the 10th century, but its current appearance is due to a renovation carried out between 1293 and 1313. The four sides are formed by small arches, with pointed arches on two sides and round arches on the other two, supported by paired small columns made of red Verona marble. On the northern side projects a quadrangular niche where the abbey's ancient well was located. On the perimeter walls of the walkways are placed sarcophagi and funerary plaques, including the tomb of Giuseppe della Scala, dating to 1313 and enriched with a lunette with an fresco by a painter of the Giotto school.

On the southern side is the aforementioned tomb of the abbey's monks, built in the 11th century by Abbot Alberico; although it is not certain that the current one is the original, it is a red marble tomb closed by a thick slab bearing a large raised cross. Above it is an inscription commemorating it. Next to it is the door leading to the upper church, featuring a lunette with an early 14th-century fresco depicting a Madonna with two angels.

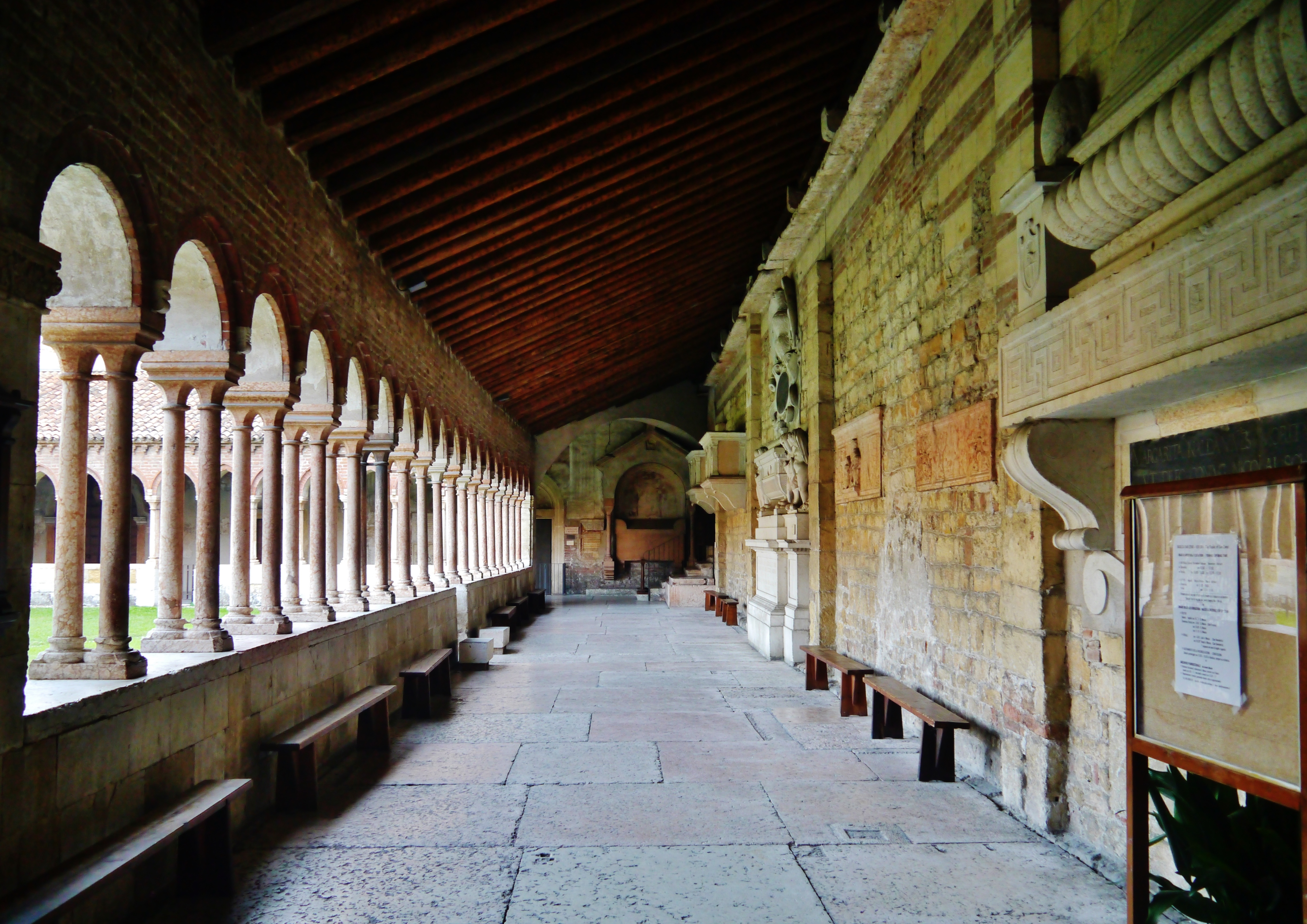
Interior of one of the cloister's arcade wings.

On the eastern wall is a large fresco by the Veronese painter Jacopo Ligozzi, depicting a Last Judgment and an Allegory. On the same wall is a door giving access, down a few steps, to the so-called chapel of San Benedetto, above which is a lunette frescoed at the end of the 14th century with a Madonna with two bishop saints.

==== Chapel of San Benedetto ====
Along the southern side of the cloister there is a door providing access to the so-called chapel (or oratory) of San Benedetto. It is a small square room, divided into three equally sized naves, covered by nine ribbed vaults supported by four pillars largely constructed from spolia materials dating to very different periods. Among these, notable are a pulvino from the 6th century in Byzantine style and a Roman cippus placed in a wall pillar. The walls feature a 14th-century decoration of yellow, red, and green squares, while on the north wall there is a fragment of a fresco not easily readable.

Various periods have been proposed for the construction of this chapel, among the most reliable is the one proposed by art historian Wart Arslan, who considers it a 12th-century work, while others, although agreeing on the dating, suggest it may have been a renovation of a previous small building dating even to the Roman period (4th–5th century). Several hypotheses have been made about the original function of the room, including that it might have been the ancient sacristy or the chapter house. The name "San Benedetto" comes from the fact that in 1723 a plaque was found whose inscription recounted how a monk of the abbey had had built at his own expense «hoc opus ecclesie sancti benedicit».

=== Interior ===
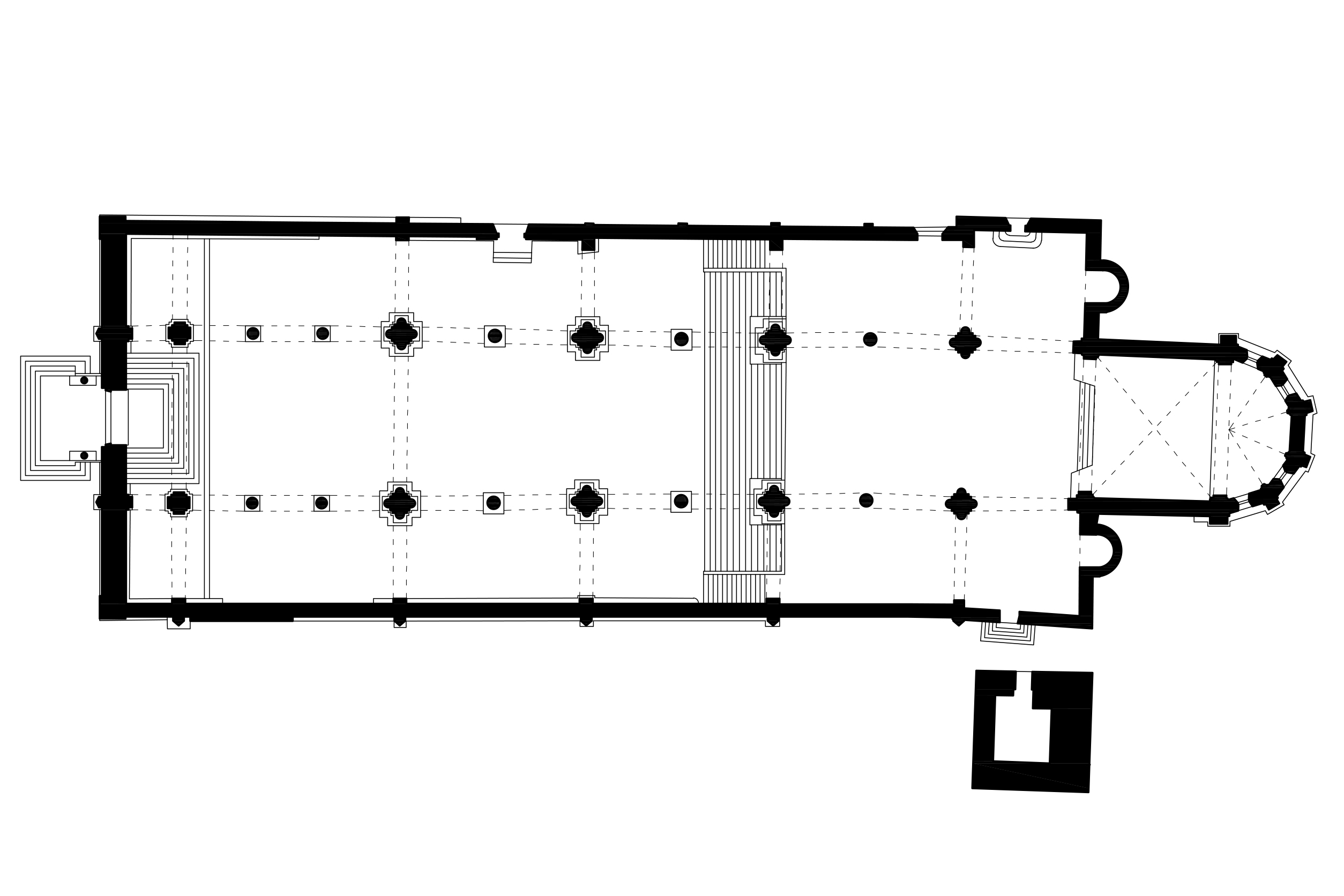
Plan of the church.

To enter the church, one ascends a few steps, symbolizing the spirit's detachment from worldly things, and then descends a few others, inviting humility. The interior has a basilica plan with the nave divided into three aisles by two rows of massive cruciform-sectioned piers alternating with columns, ten per side, topped by capitals with zoomorphic motifs and Corinthian capitals often reused from pre-existing Roman buildings. The ceiling is wooden, shaped like a ship's hull with refined decorations and was made between 1385 and 1389 during the Gothic renovation of the building. It is unanimously considered a work of art, capable of competing even with the famous ceiling of San Fermo Maggiore church. The nave is also divided by two large transverse arches giving it a certain rhythm.

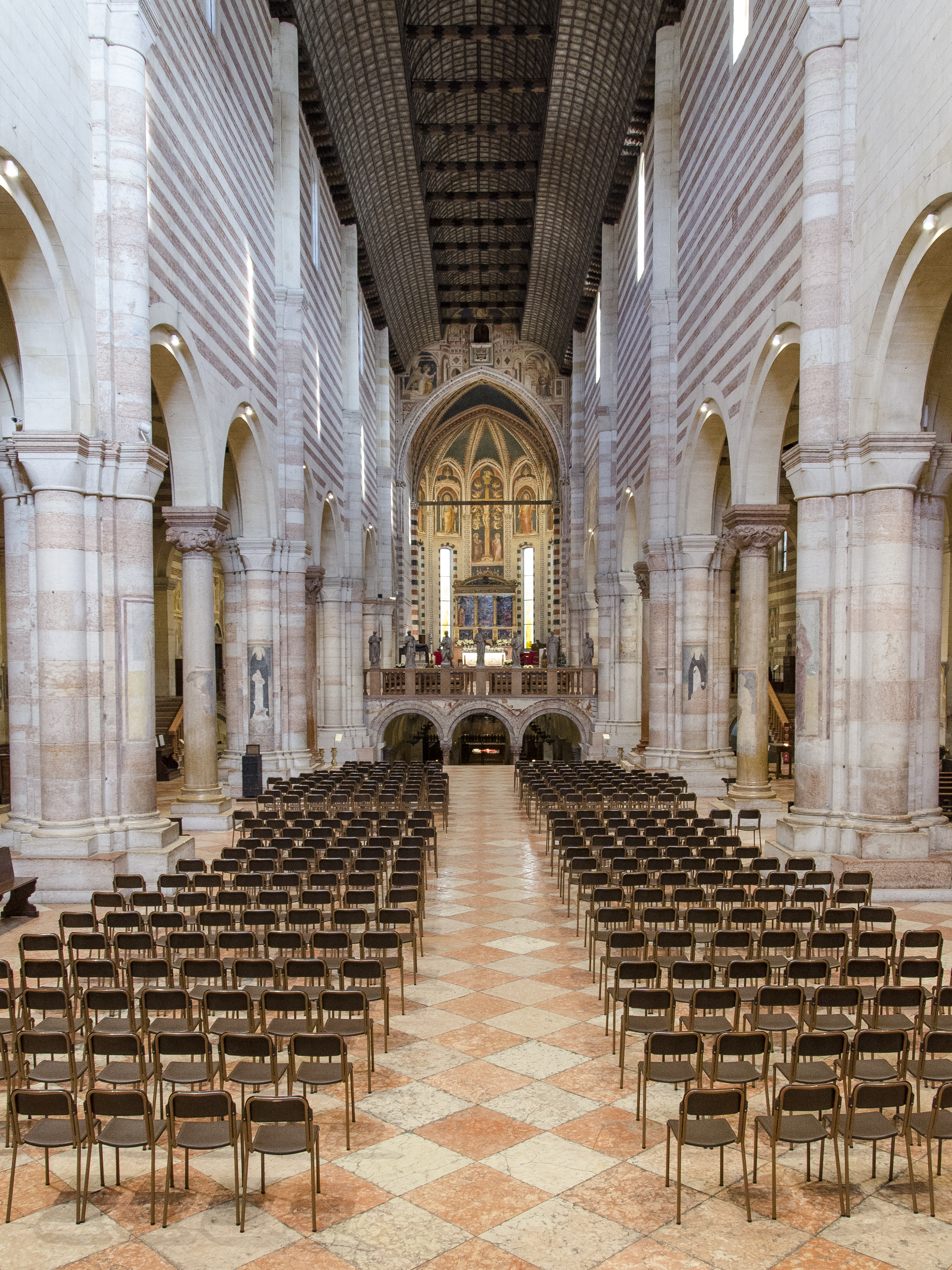
Interior of the church, showing at the back the chancel and access to the crypt.

The church contains a large crypt accessible via stairs at the end of the central nave, above which is a raised chancel reached via stairs at the end of the two minor aisles. Vertically, the space is thus divided into three levels: crypt, nave, and chancel. The chancel is also separated from the nave by a balustrade partition. Originally, the three aisles ended in three semicircular apses, as customary in Romanesque architecture, but only the southern one has been fully preserved in its original form, as the northern one was incorporated into the abbey buildings and the main apse was rebuilt in Gothic style in the 14th century.

The walls are richly decorated with frescoes created over more than two centuries, some damaged and overlapping, the oldest of which decorate the crypt. Critics usually attribute the majority of these to the so-called first and second masters of San Zeno. Art historians agree that these were not two individual painters, but the names refer to two groups of painters similar in style, period, and technique who worked in this basilica and other city locations. Conventionally, the "first master" is attributed with frescoes made around the second quarter of the 14th century, considered the first to spread the Giotto school in Verona. The "second master" refers to painters who, in the second half of the 14th century, executed numerous works in many Veronese churches, including a series of 24 votive paintings in San Zeno alone, distinguished by a more advanced style and strong references to Lombard painting culture.

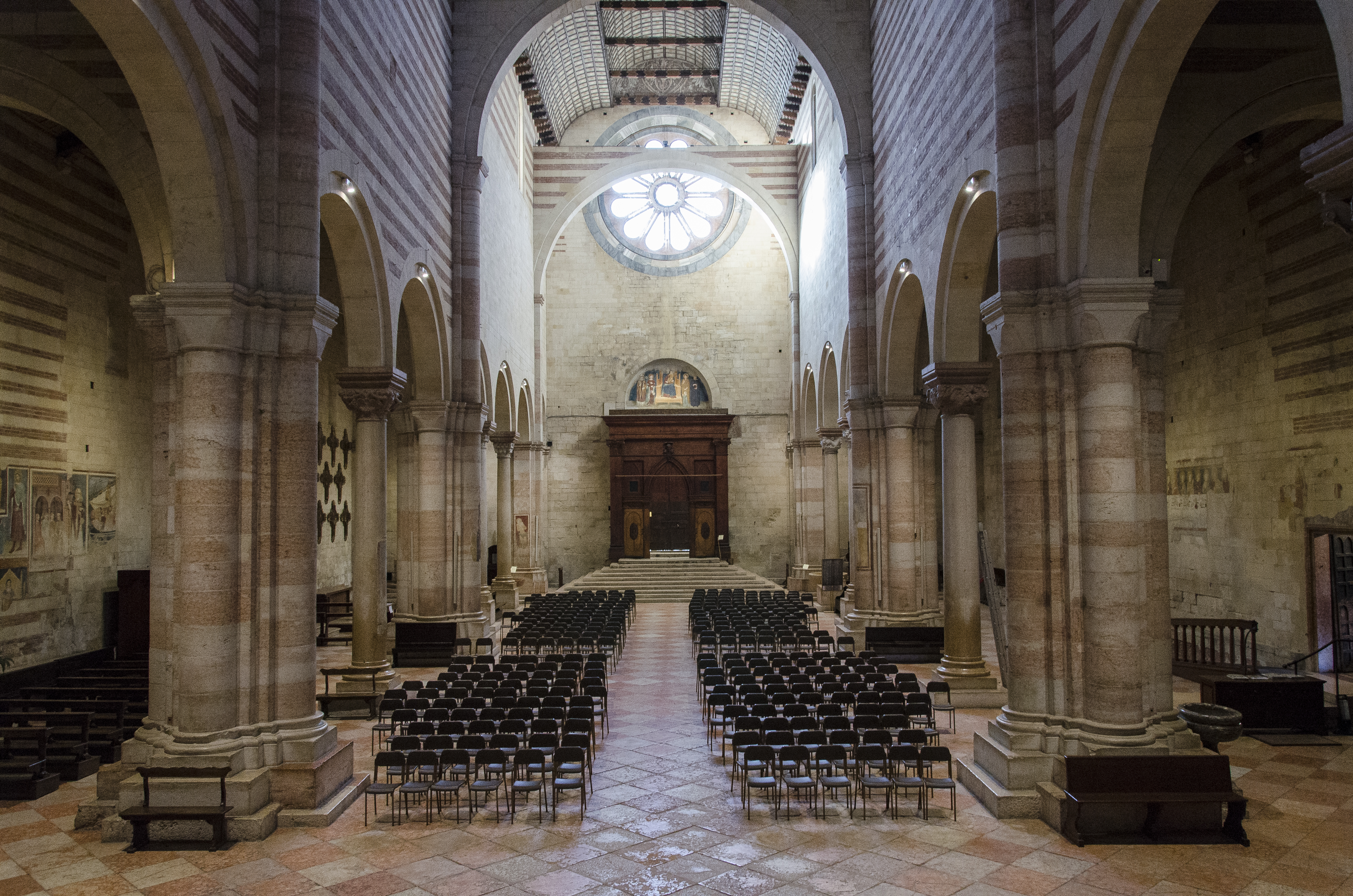
The nave of the church, viewed towards the counter-facade.

Far fewer frescoes can be attributed to known artists, among them Martino da Verona and Altichiero da Zevio. Often, the paintings bear graffiti with German names and sometimes short phrases, left by monks from Germany who stayed for long periods in the abbey, effectively becoming its masters. On the right nave is an altarpiece by Francesco Torbido, while in the apse is the famous San Zeno Altarpiece by Andrea Mantegna.

==== Right Nave ====
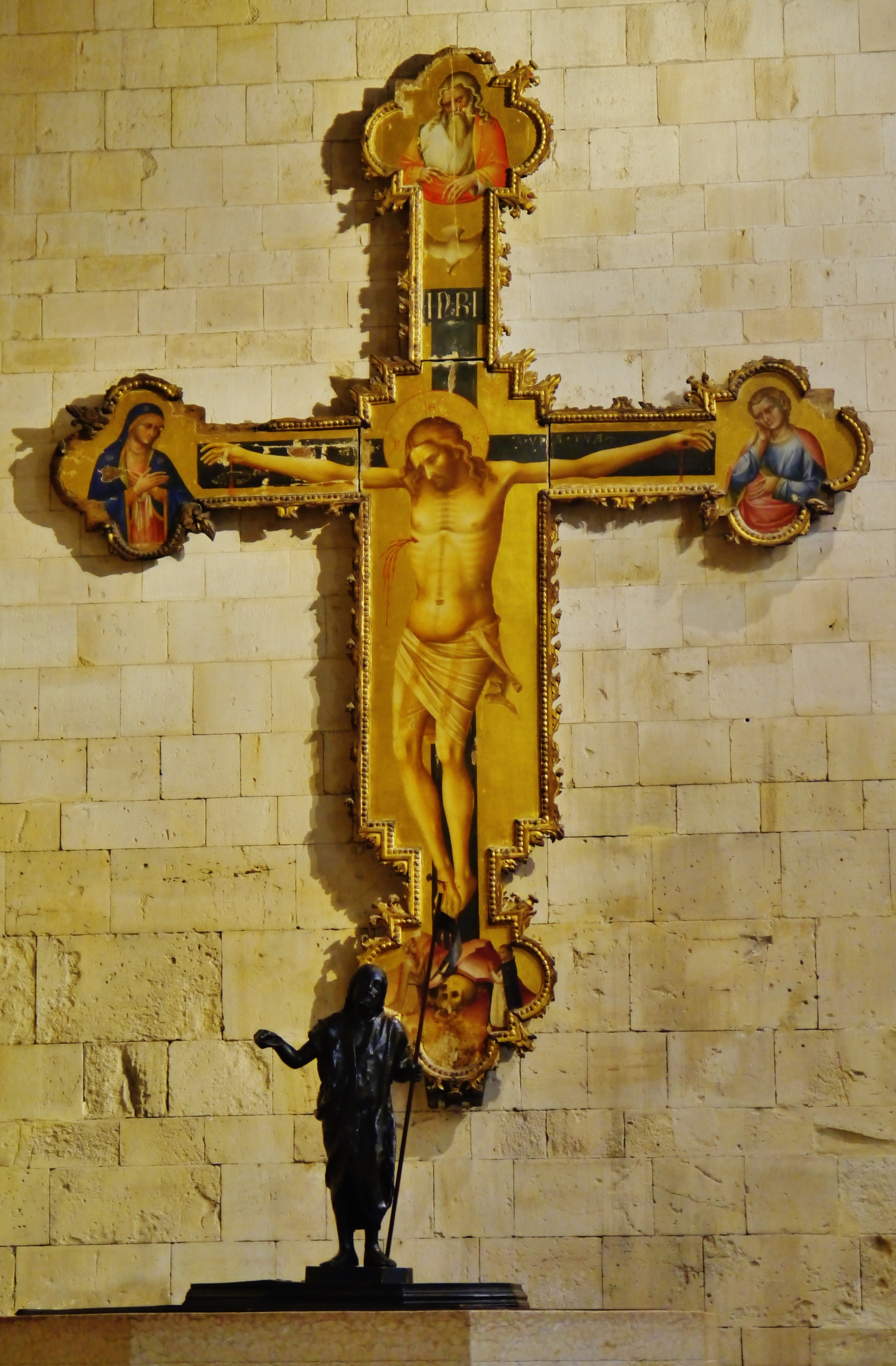
14th-century station cross.

Just inside the main door, moving towards the right nave, there is a large octagonal marble baptismal font. Tradition, though unfounded, claims its creator is the same Brioloto who made the large rose window, since a nearby inscription praises him.

Hanging on the wall of the counter-facade, next to the entrance, is a 14th-century station cross which for a long time divided critics regarding its attribution; some scholars identified it as the work of Guariento di Arpo or someone from his school, while others saw influences from Lorenzo Veneziano. More recent studies unequivocally attribute it to a young Veneziano, influenced by a Giottesque naturalism mediated by Guariento. In any case, it is a fine work in good condition, painted on a gold background; in the outer quadrilobes of the cross are depicted, respectively, in the left arm the Madonna, in the right arm Saint John, in the top the Father with the Holy Spirit, and in the lower a devotee and a kneeling Dominican monk, believed to represent the patrons. The plaque bears the Gothic letters «I.N.R.I.» and on the crossbeam «MORS MEA VITA TUA». Station crosses were typical in Early Medieval art since, at least before the Counter-Reformation, it was customary during Lenten processions for the bishop and faithful to visit the various churches, called "station churches", to venerate the preserved cross.

At the beginning of the wall is a fragment of a fresco attributed to Martino da Verona, active between the late 14th and early 15th century, believed to depict Saint Benedict. Immediately after, embedded in the wall, is the aforementioned inscription praising master Brioloto which caused the erroneous attribution of the baptismal font.

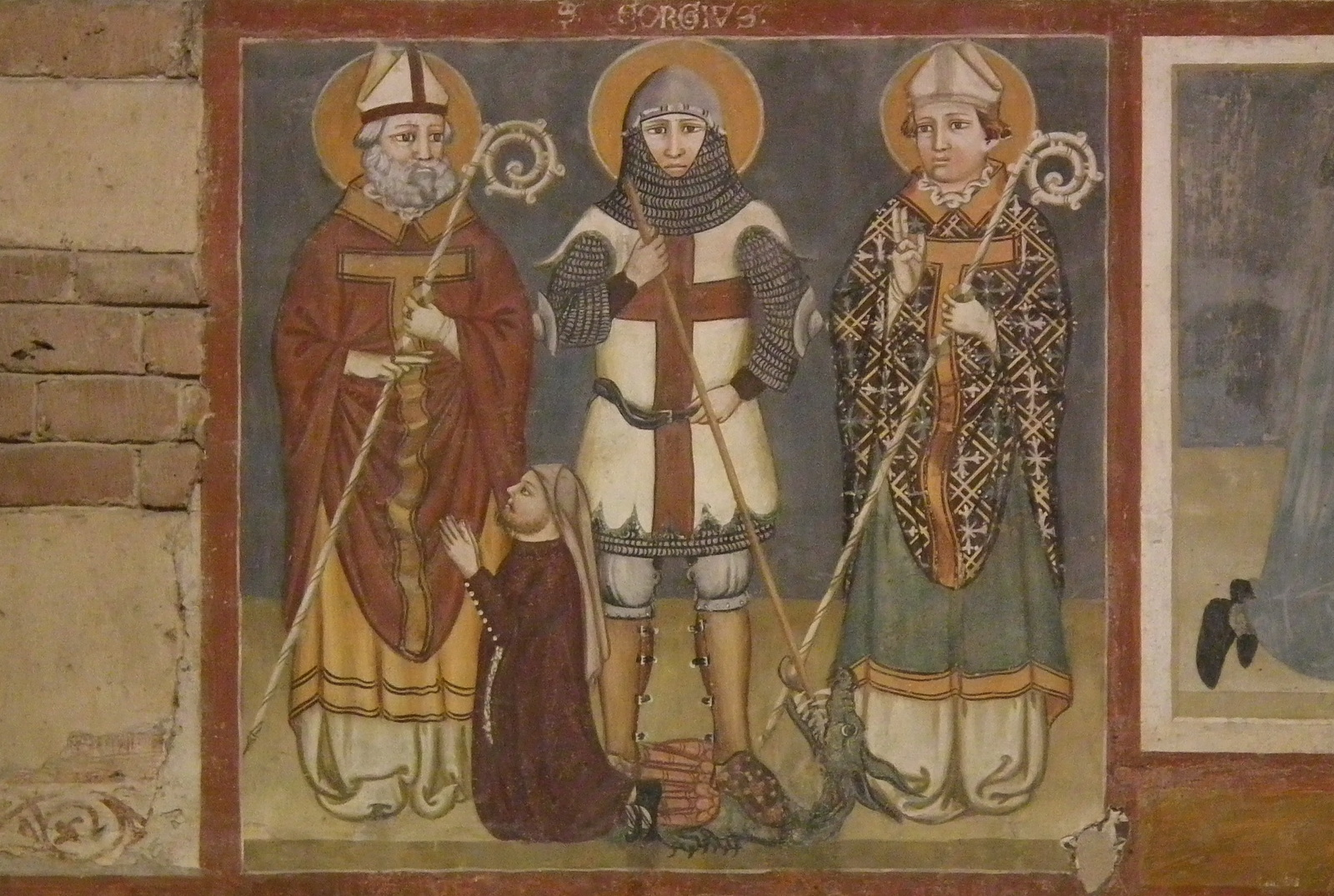
Saint George and the Dragon between two bishop saints and the patron, attributed to the so-called second master of San Zeno.

Continuing along the nave towards the chancel, one encounters a 16th-century altar whose altarpiece is a youthful work by Francesco Torbido, created around 1514, depicting a Madonna with Saints Anna, Zeno, James, Sebastian, Christopher; in the respective lunette, by the same author, a Resurrection showing the painter's connection with the master Liberale da Verona.

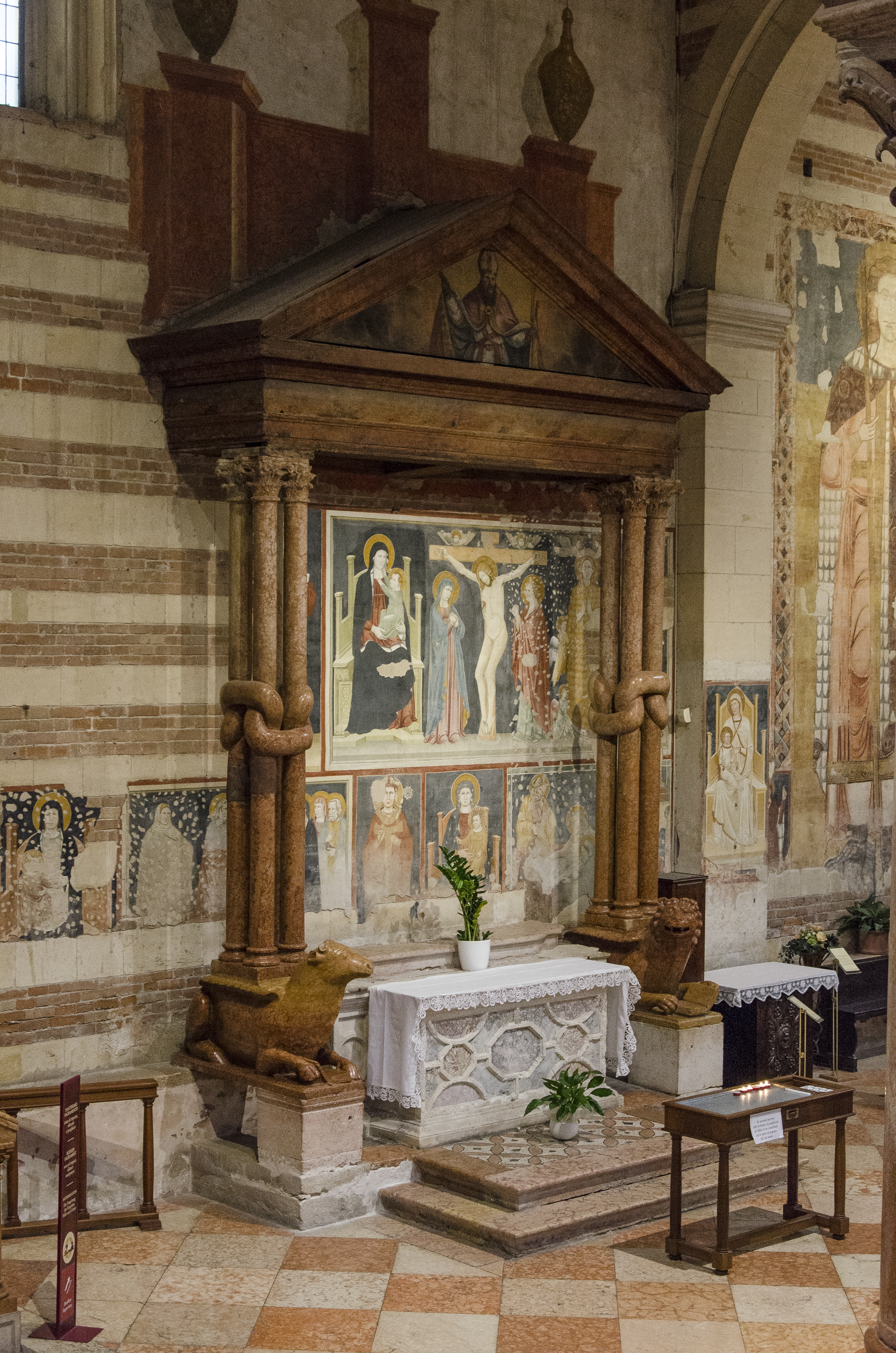
Romanesque altar, whose knotted columns may come from a 13th-century protiro.

Beyond the altar, some remains of frescoes, often overlapping, can be observed; these originally covered the walls entirely and were made between the 13th and 15th centuries by anonymous painters of the Giotto school. Among them are Saint Sigismund with a devotee, Two scenes from the life of Saint Nicholas and a Madonna enthroned with Child, attributed to the so-called second master of San Zeno, while the first master, active at the end of the 13th century, is credited with a Saint Anne enthroned with the Virgin. The series concludes with a large Saint Christopher from the 12th century.

Later, on the same wall, there is an altar of uncertain origin; some believe that its columns might have originally belonged to a protiro built in the early 13th century, possibly related to the door restored by Abbot Riprando in 1212, although Da Lisca rejects this hypothesis. The two bundles of four knotted columns entwined with serpents were made of Verona red marble and rest, on the right, on the Lion of Saint Mark, and on the left, on the Ox of Saint Luke. Art historian Loredana Olivato Puppi notes that the style of these sculptures correlates with «similar works that master Nicolò and his school executed in the same San Zeno and the Cathedral». The columns support a triangular pediment, probably dating to the 18th century, inside which is painted a Saint Zeno. On the altar wall are some frescoes, mostly attributed to the second master of San Zeno, including a Madonna enthroned with Child, a Crucifixion, a Deposition in the tomb, and Presentation in the temple. Older, possibly 13th-century, are Saint Catherine and Saint Lucy.

==== Left Nave ====
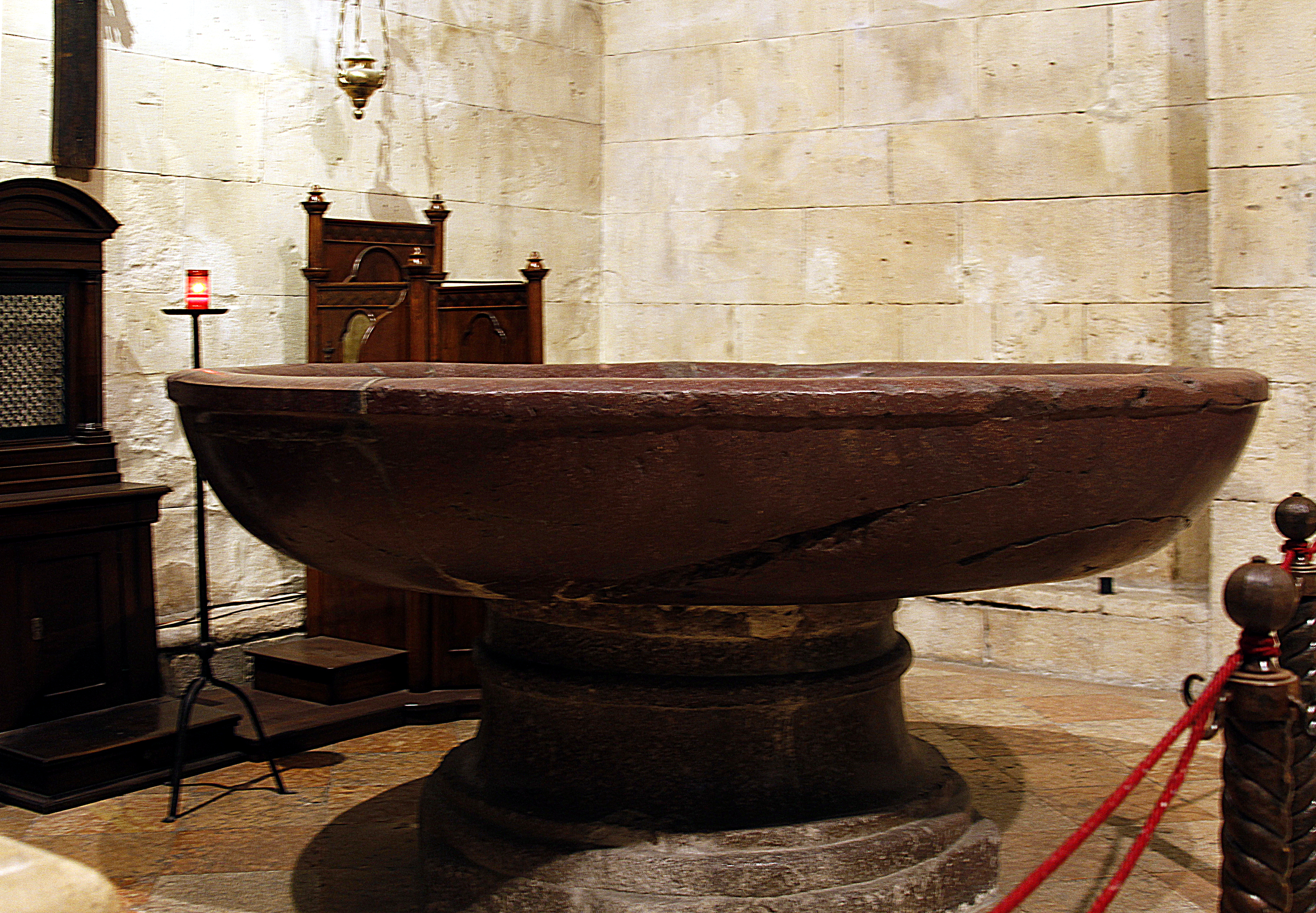
The large porphyry bowl, originally located in the Roman baths of Verona.

In the corner between the counter-façade and the left perimeter wall of the church, where the carroccio di Verona was once located, there is now a large red porphyry bowl with a diameter of 2.27 meters and modest depth, in which the remains of the base of a statue that once stood in the center can still be seen. Originating from the ancient city baths of the 2nd century and missing its central base that held a statue, it was once located outside the basilica, on the southern sagrato. Legend has it that it was transported by the defeated devil, by order of Saint Zeno, from Syria to Verona, and that the damages visible today are the marks left by his claws. In 1703, Abbot Alvise Priuli, concerned for the safety of the bowl exposed to the elements and vandals, had a small building constructed around it, but in 1819, following the demolition of the buildings on the southern side of the church, it was relocated to where it still stands today.

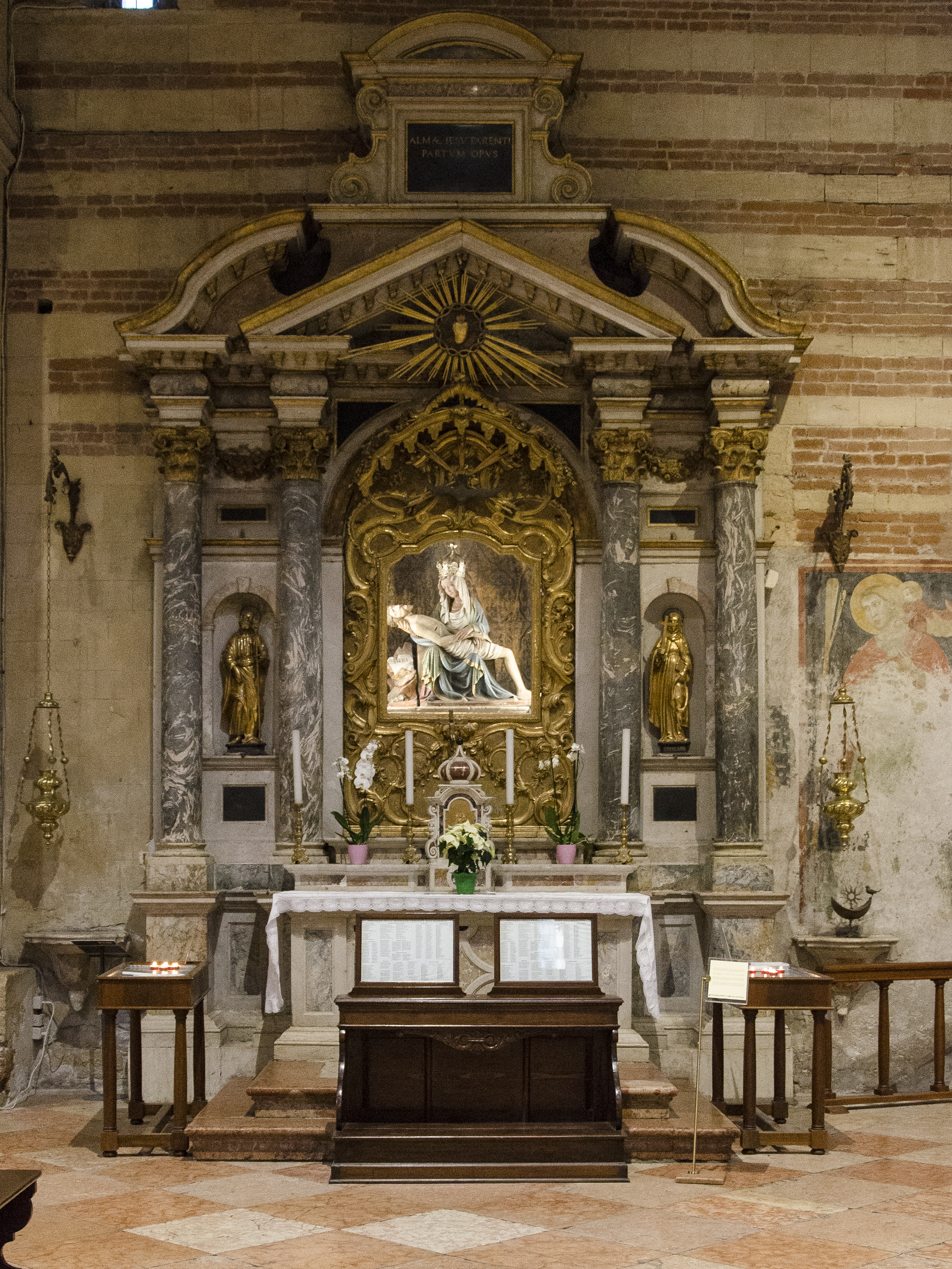
The Baroque altar, made in the 18th century.

Continuing towards the altar, one encounters a long bare stretch of wall: in fact, until 1929, when it was demolished and sold to the parish of Luserna, the main altar of the nearby Church of San Procolo had been located here for over a century. Of Baroque taste, this altar was made of colored marbles in green, yellow, white, and lapis lazuli, as well as a green marble slab where the relics of Saint Procolo were once placed; it was dedicated to the Sacred Heart of Jesus. Next is the new small altar of the Sacred Heart of Jesus, and immediately beyond, on a pilaster, a 14th-century fresco depicting a Madonna with Child. Just after, on the wall, there are the remains of an'Last Supper. At the door leading to the cloister of the adjacent monastery, there are around it some fresco fragments depicting various saints, while immediately after, a Last Judgment of the 13th century stands out, a Baptism Scene (according to some, a Baptism of Constantine) attributed to the second master, and below them, Madonna in Throne, Saint John the Evangelist, Saint Bartholomew, Saint Mary Magdalene, and a Holy Evangelist. On the next pilaster, there is a Saint Elizabeth in profile, two Madonna with Child on the front and on the other side a Saint Dionysius from the 14th century.

The next altar, dedicated to the Madonna and dating to the 18th century, contains in its niche a soft-stone statue of the Virgin, seated, holding the dead Child on her knees. The interesting sculpture, which can be dated around the mid-15th century, reveals a Germanic style. It was highly venerated in the Church of San Procolo, where in 1621, along with the altar, a chapel was erected for it, as known from the inscription on the predella. The altar is composed of four black marble columns, between which are two small gilded statues of saints, placed in niches.

Beyond the altar, some frescoes can be observed, including a Saint Christopher, datable to the mid-14th century, and, beside the steps leading to the chancel, a Martyrdom of Saint Stephen and a Last Judgment with Christ between Mary and Saint John the Evangelist, an angel, and Saint Zeno.

==== Pontile-tramezzo ====
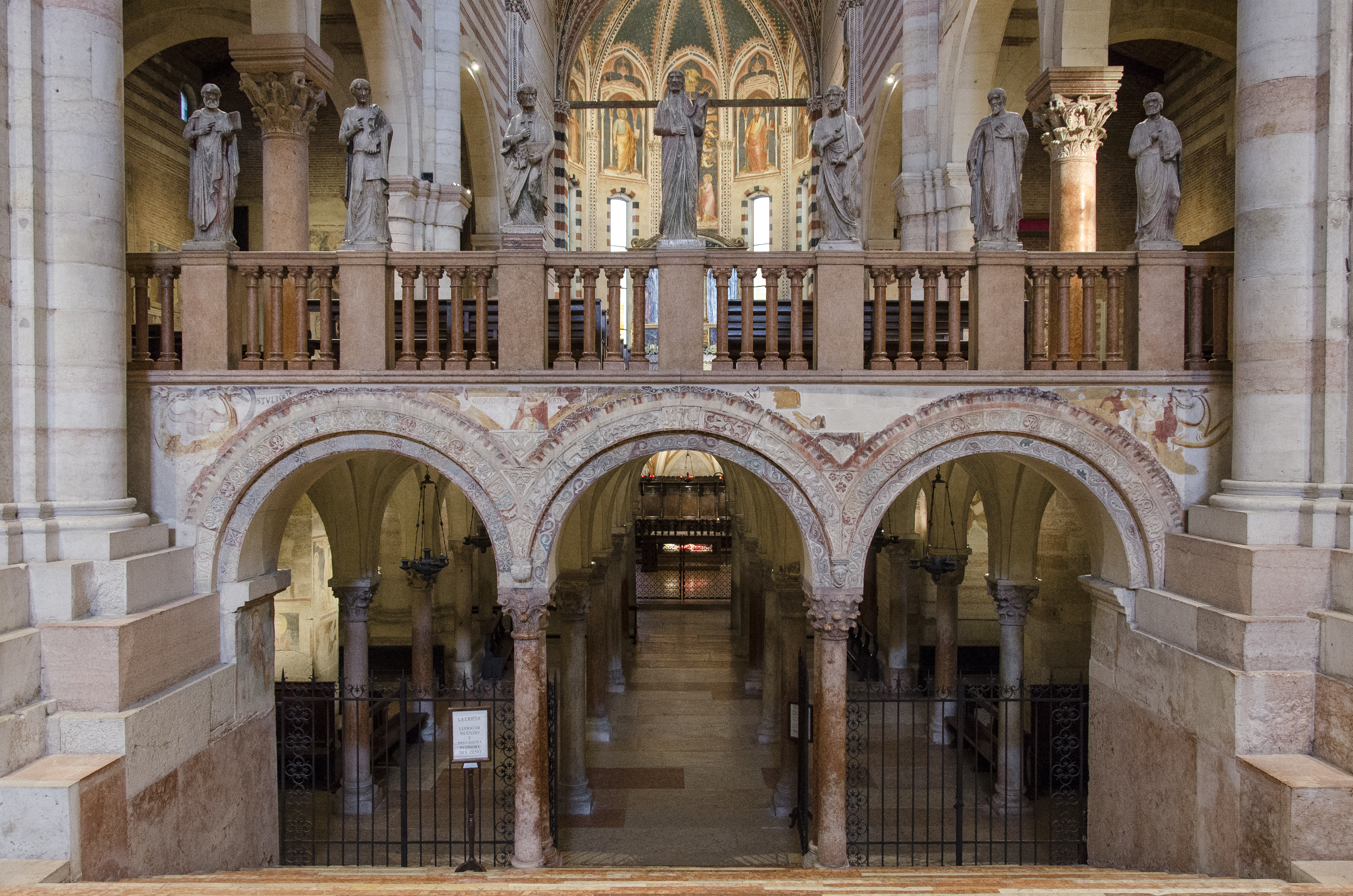
Central part of the pontile-tramezzo over the stairs descending to the crypt.

The parish area of the church is separated from the chancel by a pontile-tramezzo, which, with its modern balaustra made of red marble and its ancient statues, dates back to 1870, when the central staircase was demolished and the side stairs restored. The old pontile consisted of a wall that rose much higher than the current one, as can be inferred from the frescoes above the arches of the crypt, which must have continued upward. This architectural element recalls the iconostasis of the Byzantine tradition.

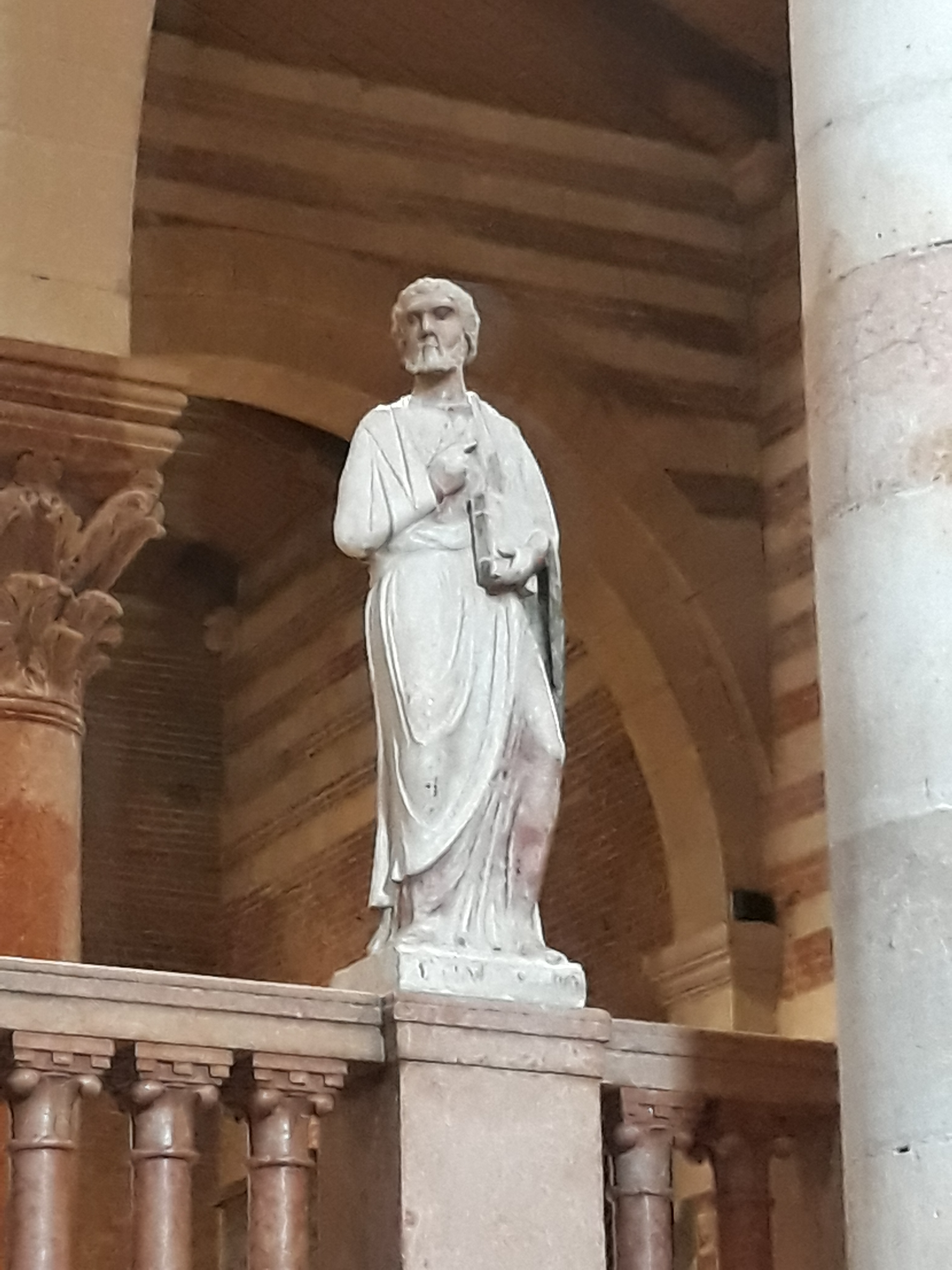
One of the statues that make up the pontile.

By closely observing the statues currently placed on it, which tradition attributed to Master Brioloto, traces of the original polychrome coloring can still be seen; the arrangement of the subjects, from left, is as follows: Apostles Bartholomew, Matthias, James the Lesser, Evangelists Matthew and John, Peter, Christ, James the Greater, Thomas, and Simon, and on the right, Andrew, Philip, and Thaddeus. Most historians believe that their creation is attributable to the same stonecutter, while others, like Géza de Fràncovich, propose that they are the work of two distinct sculptors, assigning to the better of the two the figures of Christ, James the Greater, Matthew the Evangelist, Peter, James the Lesser, and Thomas. All, however, note how the figurative characteristics of the figures, that is, elongated bodies, almost contracted limbs, hair with numerous locks, and carefully rendered folds of clothing, suggest an influence of early German Gothic; this can be explained by the intense connections Verona maintained with the Germanic world during the time of Ezzelino III da Romano, ally of Emperor Frederick II, Holy Roman Emperor and head of the March of Verona in the 13th century.

The only inscription that Simeoni considers original is on the base of Christ, which, in small 13th-century Romanesque letters, reads: «vide tomas noli esse incredulus set fidelis», a phrase that can be related to the fight against the heresy of the Cathars raging along the Adige at that time.

==== Chancel ====
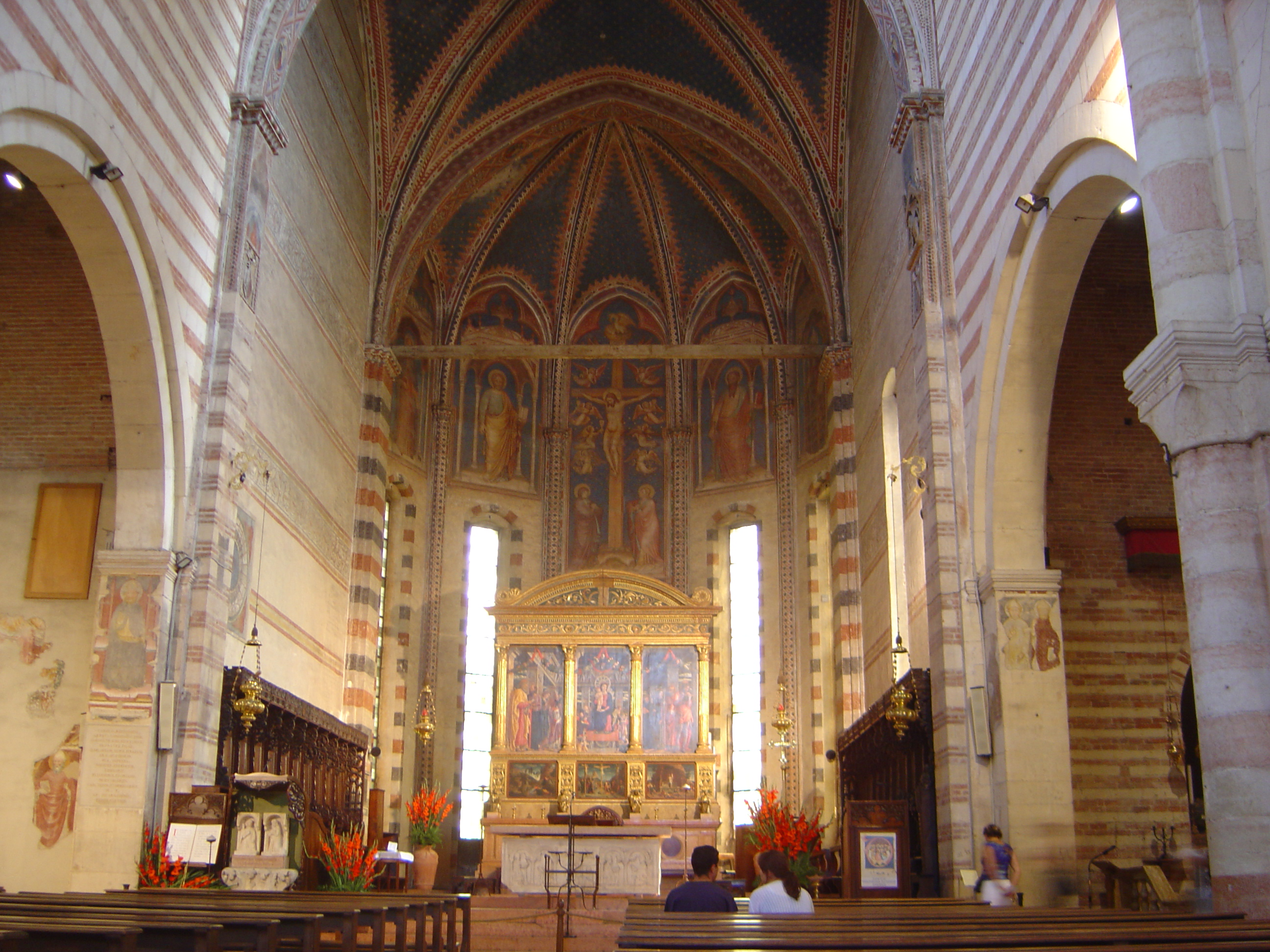
Chancel of the Basilica of San Zeno.

The chancel is elevated above the basilica floor and is accessible via two staircases located in the side naves, then crossing the previously described pontile-tramezzo. The walls feature several superimposed frescoes from different periods. On them are inscriptions recounting events in the history of Verona, such as the Adige flood of 3 October 1239, which caused the demolition of three bridges, the sack of the city by Gian Galeazzo Visconti on 29 June 1390, and the earthquake of 1695. The chancel consists of the central area where the main altar is located, with extensions of the side naves on its sides, decorated with fresco fragments and ending in two small lateral apses, while at the end is the large main apse with the choir.

On the left wall, above the entrance to the sacristy, there is a large painting attributed to Altichiero or someone from his school, the Crucifixion, and in the small left apse the red and polychrome marble statue depicting the patron, called "San Zeno che ride", made by an anonymous artist in the 12th century, which represents one of the most important icons for the people of Verona. To the right of the sacristy door is a votive panel depicting Saint Zeno presenting the donors to the Mother of God, from the 14th century.

On the right wall of the chancel are several 14th-century frescoes, among them recognizable are Baptism of Jesus, Resurrection of Lazarus, Saint George and the Dragon, Saints Benigno and Caro carry the body of Saint Zeno. The wall ending with the small right apse is perhaps one of the oldest parts of the basilica, as it is believed to belong to the 10th-century building, and it is the only original apse to have survived entirely. Inside it, in the 19th century, the altar called of the Blessed Sacrament was placed. In the intrados of the apse, there are remains of a 14th-century fresco decoration.

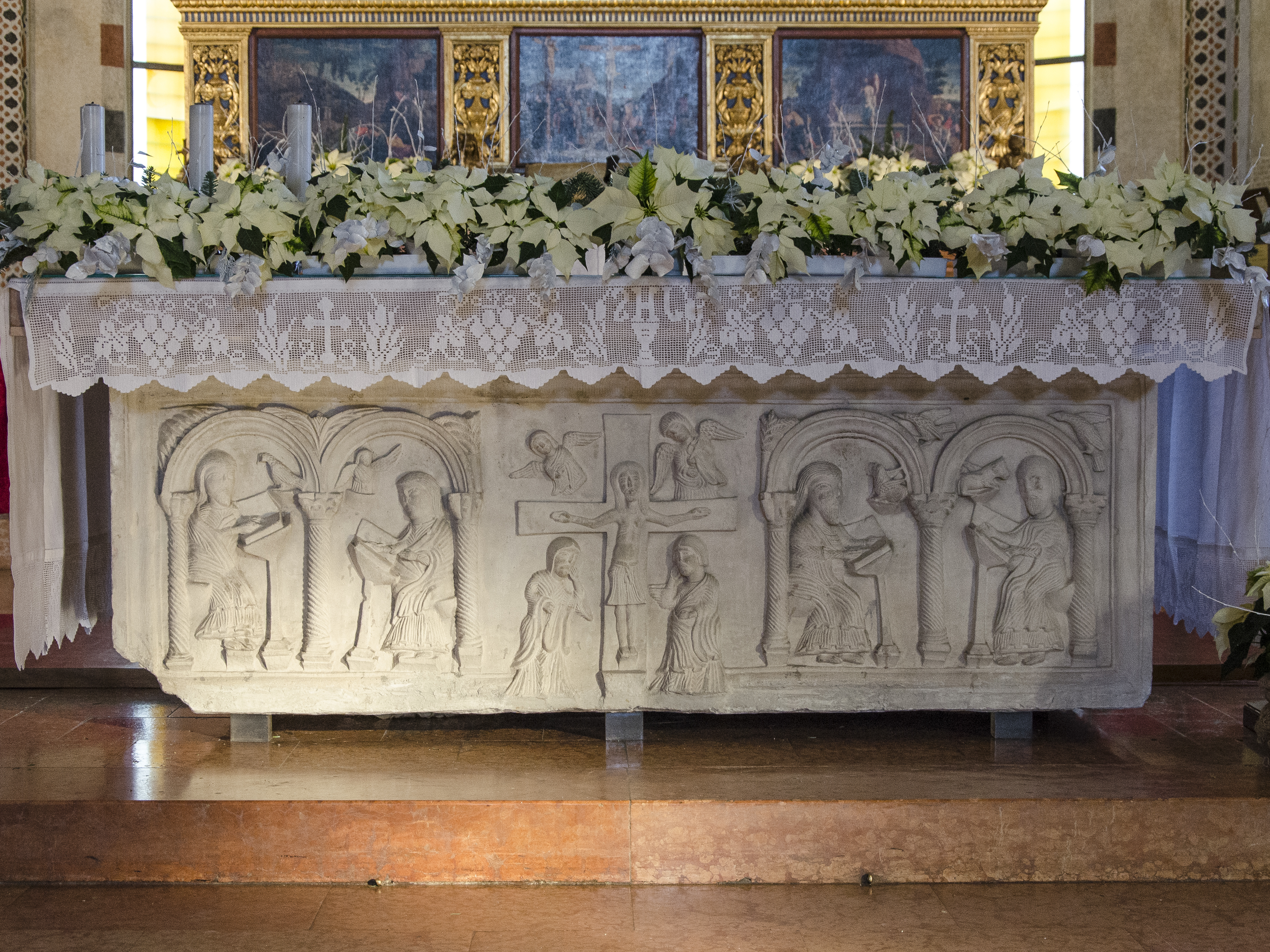
Sarcophagus of Saints Lupicinus, Lucillus, and Crescentianus used as main altar.

Serving as the main altar is the sarcophagus of Saints Lupicinus, Lucillus, and Crescentianus, all three Veronese bishops, previously kept in the crypt. The presence of the saints' relics is attested by an inspection inscription dated 1808, engraved on the headboard. These bodies do not appear among those found in 1492, so their transfer from the original separate tombs predates that year. The sarcophagus is richly decorated in bas-relief: on the front, in the center, a crucifixion between John and Mary and two angels; on the sides, two on each side, the four evangelists with their symbols writing; on the back in the center, Christ with two male figures; on the right, the gates of hell from which Christ frees some souls; on the left, two figures of a man and a woman. On the headboard, a hunting scene appears, with the first figure holding a horn in the left hand and restraining a dog with the right, while the other seems to prevent a lion from biting a lamb. Other figures are above. There is no clear evidence to date the creation of the sarcophagus, but according to Alessandro da Lisca, it could be from the beginning of the 10th century.

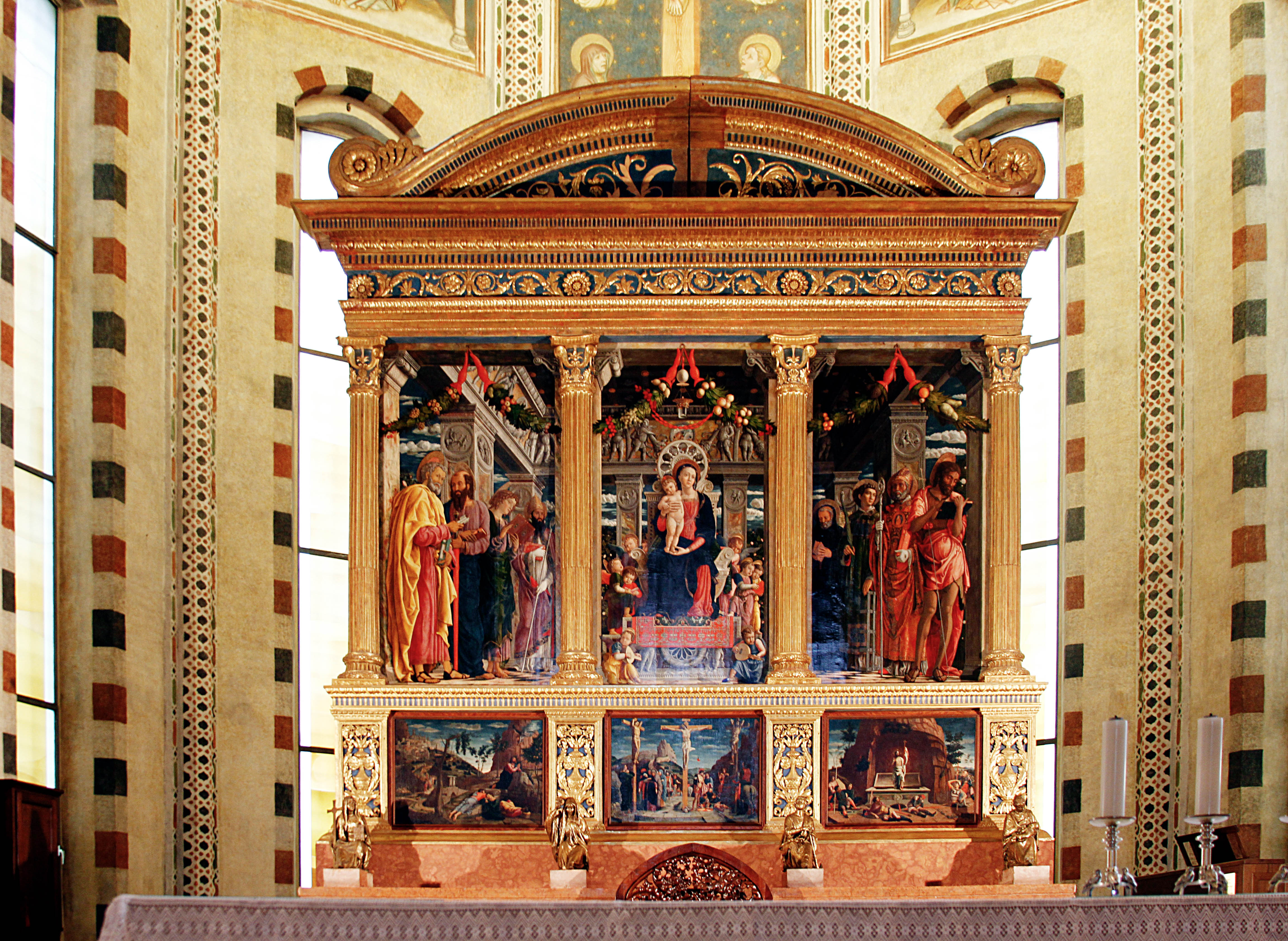
Andrea Mantegna, San Zeno Altarpiece.

The most important work placed in the chancel is the altarpiece by Andrea Mantegna, considered a masterpiece of Italian Renaissance painting. The subject of the polyptych is, in the upper triptych, the Madonna with Child and saints and in the predella scenes from the life of Jesus. The polyptych was taken by Napoleon's French troops in 1797, and the upper part was recovered after several years, while the predella remained in France; what is seen today in situ is a copy, made by Paolino Caliari, descendant of Paolo Veronese.

===== Main Apse =====
The current apse, in Gothic style, is polygonal in shape and was built between 1386 and 1389; it is accessed through a large triumphal arch, on which is painted an'Annunciation, the work of Master Martino da Verona, commissioned by Abbot Cappelli and executed between 1391 and 1399, completed by some of his pupils during the time of Abbot Pietro Emilei. On the left wall, near the pilaster, there is a clock dial with hours that can be attributed to the 15th century; a corresponding external dial existed, almost entirely disappeared. On the sides of the square wall there are simple horizontal decorative bands, some with scrolls in red, yellow, and black; the parts not remade are thought to have been created at the end of the 13th century.

Also by Martino da Verona is a large Crucifixion fresco at the back of the apse, superimposed on a Saint Zeno seated on a rich throne, the latter commissioned by Marco Emilei (1421–1430) to a follower of Martino. The apse vault is entirely decorated with a blue sky dotted with eight-pointed stars, while the arches bear the coats of arms of Abbot Emilei. The vaults are by Masters Giovanni and Niccolò da Ferrara. Beneath the apse vault, in Gothic niches, are the Saints Peter, Paul, and Benedict.

==== Crypt ====
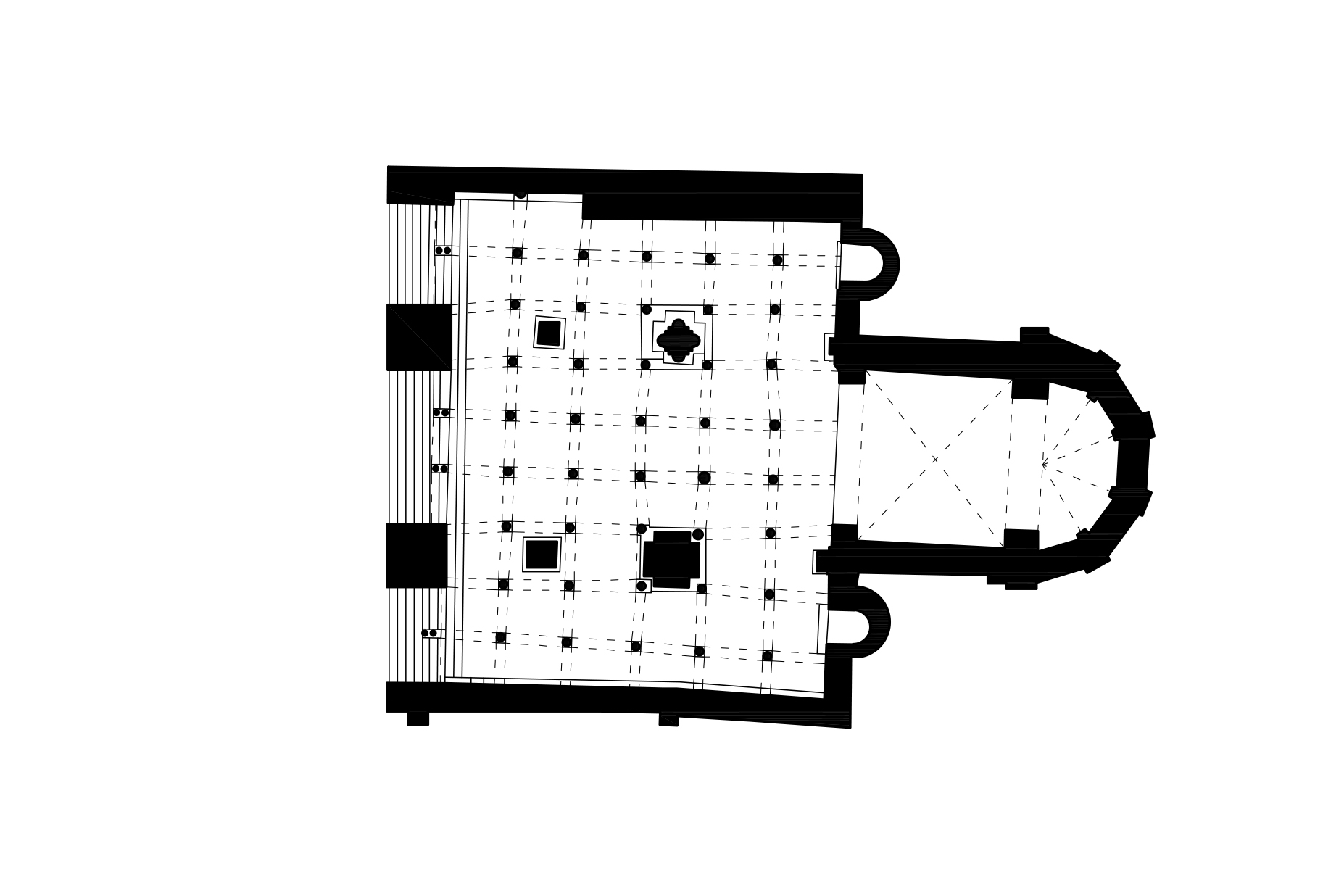
Plan of the crypt.

Work on the crypt likely began around the beginning of the 10th century and continued for about a century until the completion of the first Romanesque church, i.e., until the early 11th century. Soon after, the northern entrance was added. Damaged during the earthquake of 1117, it was rebuilt during works carried out throughout the building between that year and 1138, and underwent further restoration around the end of the 12th century. Finally, in the first decades of the 13th century, it was aesthetically and structurally completed with the opening of the northern entrance.

The succession of these interventions, various necessary adaptations, and structural compromises explain some irregularities observable in the vaults and columns. The interior space is divided into twelve naves composed of intersecting galleries: nine from west to east, six from north to south, separated by 49 columns supporting the arches that form the 54 ribbed vaults of the ceiling. Each column has a carved capital, each different from the other.

All capitals date back to the 10th century except for three that are reused elements from a previous Roman-era building. Among the subjects represented are floral motifs, animals, mythical monsters, some human heads, leaves, wreaths, and hunting scenes. In many of them, a clear influence from Byzantine art can be observed. In the crypt apse lies the body of Saint Zeno, kept in a visible sarcophagus consecrated in 1939, with his face covered by a silver mask and dressed in pontifical garments, while on the wall rests the previous cenotaph. Once in the crypt was also the sarcophagus of Saints Lucillus, Lupicinus, and Crescentianus, now located in the upper chancel, serving as the main altar.

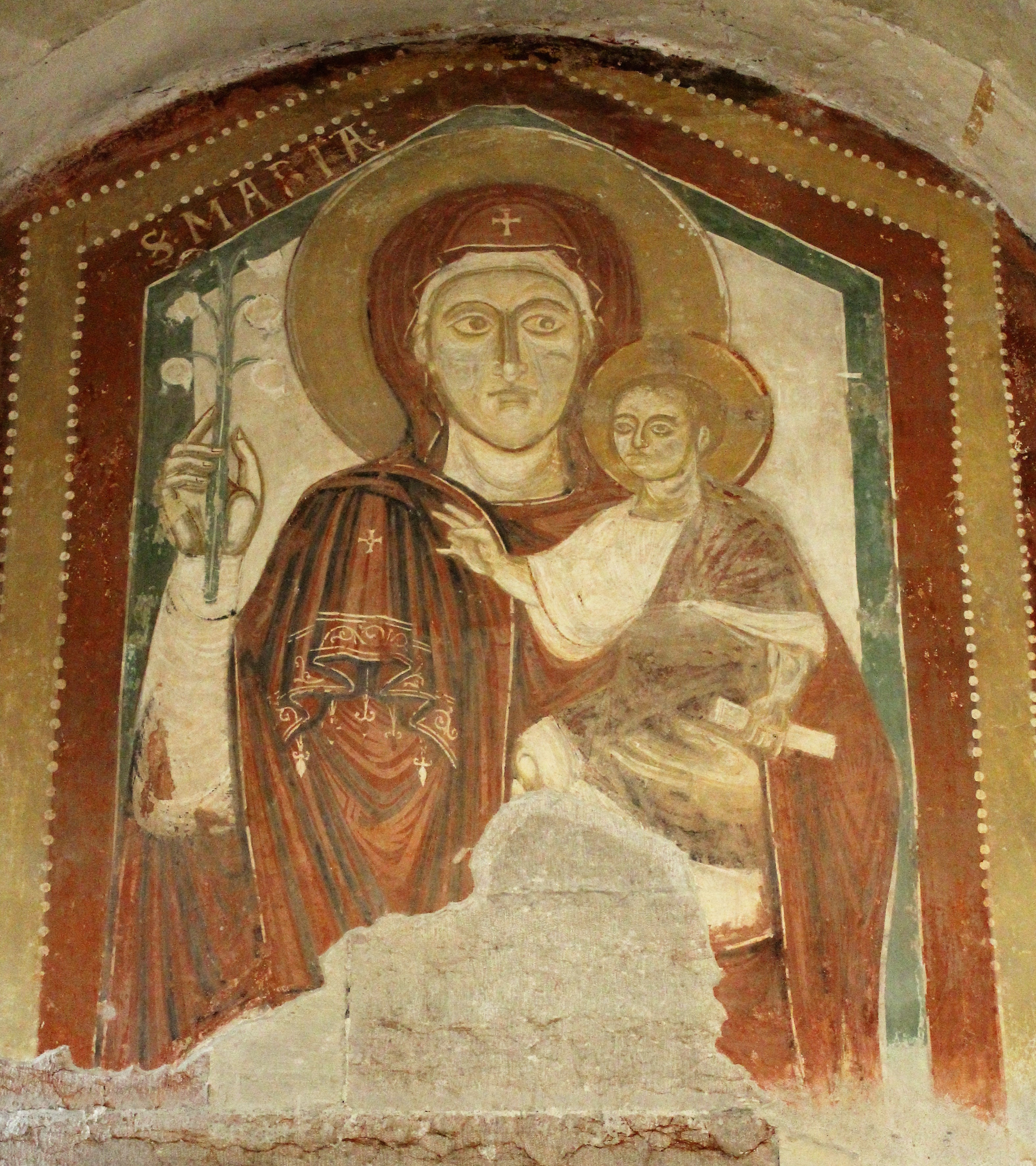
Fresco depicting the Madonna with Child.

Both the walls and pillars of the crypt were originally richly decorated with frescoes from various periods; however, today only some fragments remain visible, often damaged or superimposed. Among them are: on the west wall, a fragment of a Saint and, to its right, a depiction of the Flight into Egypt; a Madonna of Mercy with only the upper body preserved; a fragment of a Crucifixion on a projecting wall; a Holy Bishop believed to be the work of a mid-14th-century master; a Madonna with Child and a Crucifixion with the Virgin on the same pillar; a Saint John and a holy bishop datable to the second half of the 14th century; another Madonna with Child from the late 13th century placed on the second pillar on the left, above a semi-column.

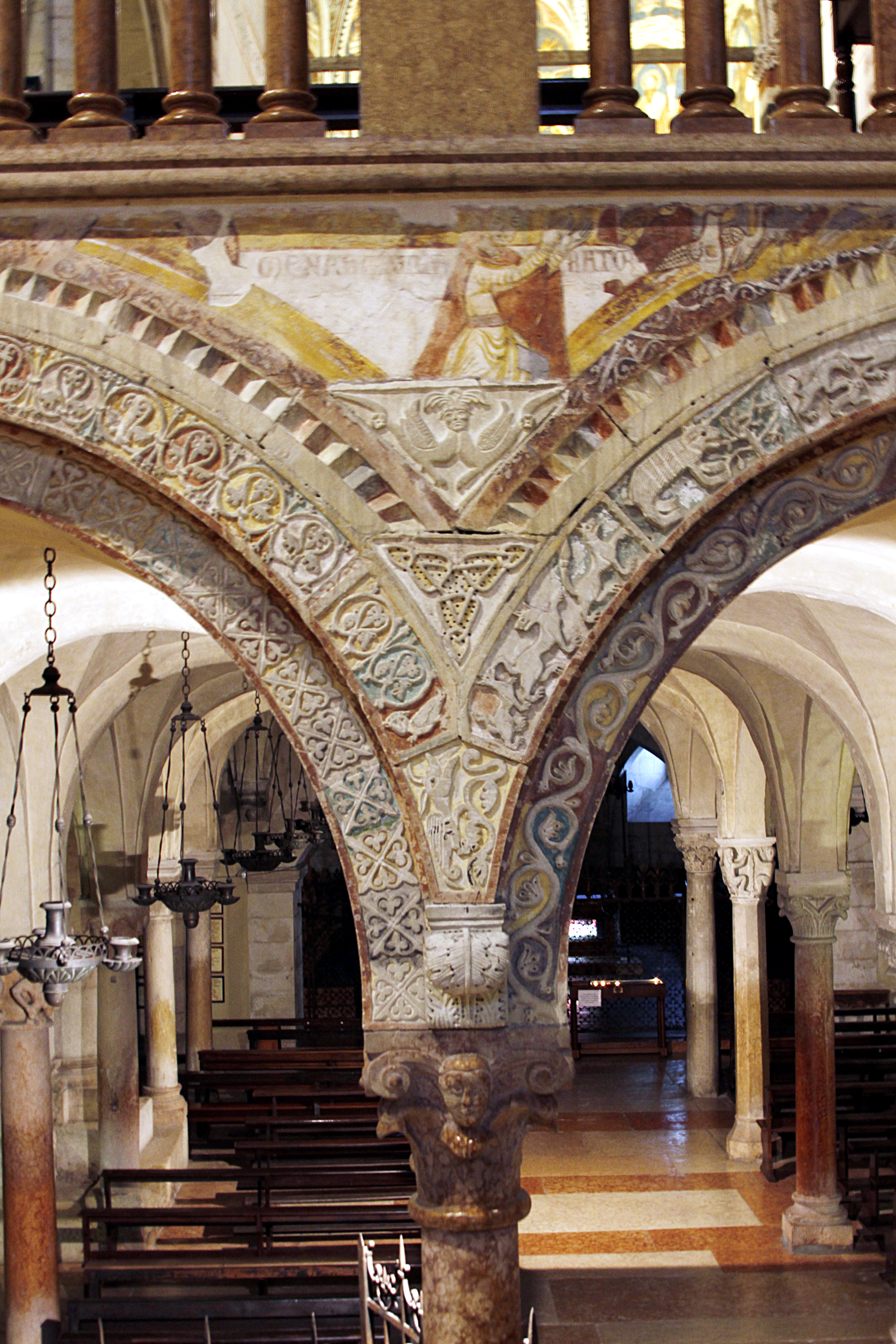
Detail of the marble friezes on the entrance arches of the crypt, made by Master Adamino.

Adamino da San Giorgio, a local sculptor and also the author of the marble friezes on the basilica façade, in 1225 carved decorations on the access arches featuring non-religious subjects: fantastic and monstrous animals. Each arch has a double moulding; they are adorned with elegant floral volutes and fruits. The outer band depicts animals and hunting scenes with dogs or beasts chasing or confronting each other, men attacking beasts, monsters, a stork killing a serpent, roosters carrying a fox, and other figures. The central bands meet on a small capital, and the arches above the simple central white capital are supported by a red marble shaft pierced by the union of four small columns. On the front of the capital is the Gothic inscription attesting the attribution to Adamino: «ADAMINUS DE SANCTO GEORGIO ME FECIT». Finally, the crypt entrance is closed by an iron grille considered very elegant.

== Bibliography ==
- Archivio storico della curia diocesana di Verona, ed. (2015). Cenni storici sulle chiese parrocchiali della diocesi di Verona (PDF). Verona: Archivio storico Curia Diocesana. VIA0292237. Archived from the original (PDF) on 2020-07-25.
- Arslan, Edoardo (1939). L'architettura romanica veronese. Verona: La Tipografica veronese. RAV0056913.
- Arslan, Edoardo (1943). La pittura e la scultura veronese dal secolo 8. al secolo 13. Milano: Bocca. RAV0057216.
- Benini, Gianfranco (1988). Le chiese di Verona: guida storico-artistica. Arte e natura libri. PUV0856596.
- Brugnoli, Pierpaolo, ed. (1986). L'abazia e il chiostro di S. Zeno Maggiore in Verona: un recente intervento di restauro. Vago di Lavagno: Banca Popolare di Verona. RAV0018362.
- Castagnetti, Andrea (1991). Le città della Marca Veronese. Verona: Libreria Universitaria Editrice. TO00110950.
- Ciatti, Marco; Marini, Paola, eds. (2009). Andrea Mantegna. La Pala di San Zeno: studio e conservazione. Firenze: Edifir. ISBN 978-88-7970-454-0.
- Cozzi, Enrica (1992). Mauro Lucco (ed.). La pittura nel Veneto. Il Trecento. Milano: Electa. ISBN 978-88-43536-14-6.
- Da Lisca, Alessandro (1941). La basilica di San Zenone in Verona. Verona: Scuola Tipografica Don Bosco. VEA0043997.
- Ederle, Guglielmo (1953). La Basilica di S. Zeno. Verona: Edizioni di vita veronese. CUB0251225.
- Fainelli, Vittorio (1940). Dalla caduta dell'impero romano alla fine del periodo carolingio. Venezia: Deputazione di storia patria per le Venezie. TO01469464.
- Fasanari, Raffaele (1956). I bronzi del portale di San Zeno. Verona: Vita veronese. LO10749427.
- Fasanari, Raffaele (1964). Il portale di San Zeno: marmi. Verona: Vita veronese. PUV0442164.
- Lorenzoni, Giovanni; Valenzano, Giovanna (2000). Il Duomo di Modena e la Basilica di San Zeno. Verona: Banca Popolare di Verona. PUV0648522.
- Marchi, Cesare (1989). Grandi peccatori grandi cattedrali. Milano: Rizzoli. RLZ0193938.
- Mellini, Gian Lorenzo (1992). I maestri dei bronzi di San Zeno. Verona: Banca popolare di Verona. LO10308248.
- Orti Manara, Girolamo (1839). Dell'antica basilica di San Zeno. Verona.
- Parolotto, Alessia (2002). La biblioteca del monastero di San Zeno in Verona (1318-1770). Verona: Della Scala. PUV0896278.
- Patuzzo, Mario (2010). San Zeno: gioiello d'arte romanica. Vago di Lavagno: Editrice La Grafica. VIA0208919.
- Pietropoli, Fabrizio (2004). Francesca Flores d'Arcais (ed.). La pittura nel Veneto. Le origini. Milano: Electa. ISBN 88-370-2583-1.
- Puppi, Loredana Olivato (1981). San Zeno. Verona: Banca Popolare di Verona. TO01113226.
- Simeoni, Luigi (1909). S. Zeno di Verona. Studi con nuovi documenti. Verona: Baroni. LO10824318.
- Solinas, Giovanni (1981). Storia di Verona. Verona: Centro Rinascita. SBL0619693.
- Trecca, Giuseppe (1938). La facciata della basilica di S. Zeno. Verona: La tipografica veronese. UM10039825.
- Valenzano, Giovanna (1993). La basilica di san Zeno in Verona: problemi architettonici. Vicenza: Neri Pozza. ISBN 88-7305-420-X.
- Watkin, David (2016). Storia dell'architettura occidentale. Bologna: Zanichelli. ISBN 978-88-08-62114-6.
- Musetti, Silvia (2015). "Il rosone di Brioloto". In Francesco Butturini; Flavio Pachera (eds.). San Zeno Maggiore a Verona. Il campanile e la facciata. Restauri, analisi tecniche e nuove interpretazioni. Verona: Istituto Salesiano San Zeno. ISBN 88-89112-09-3. TSA1484558.

== See also ==
- San Zeno Altarpiece: by Renaissance painter Andrea Mantegna
- St. Anthony's Church: architecture inspired by San Zeno.
- St. Mark's Anglican, a Parish church in Portland, Oregon erected in 1925 as a replica of San Zeno, Verona.
