= Abbey of San Zeno, Verona =

Abbey in Verona, Italy

Abbey of San Zeno
- Abbazia di San Zeno
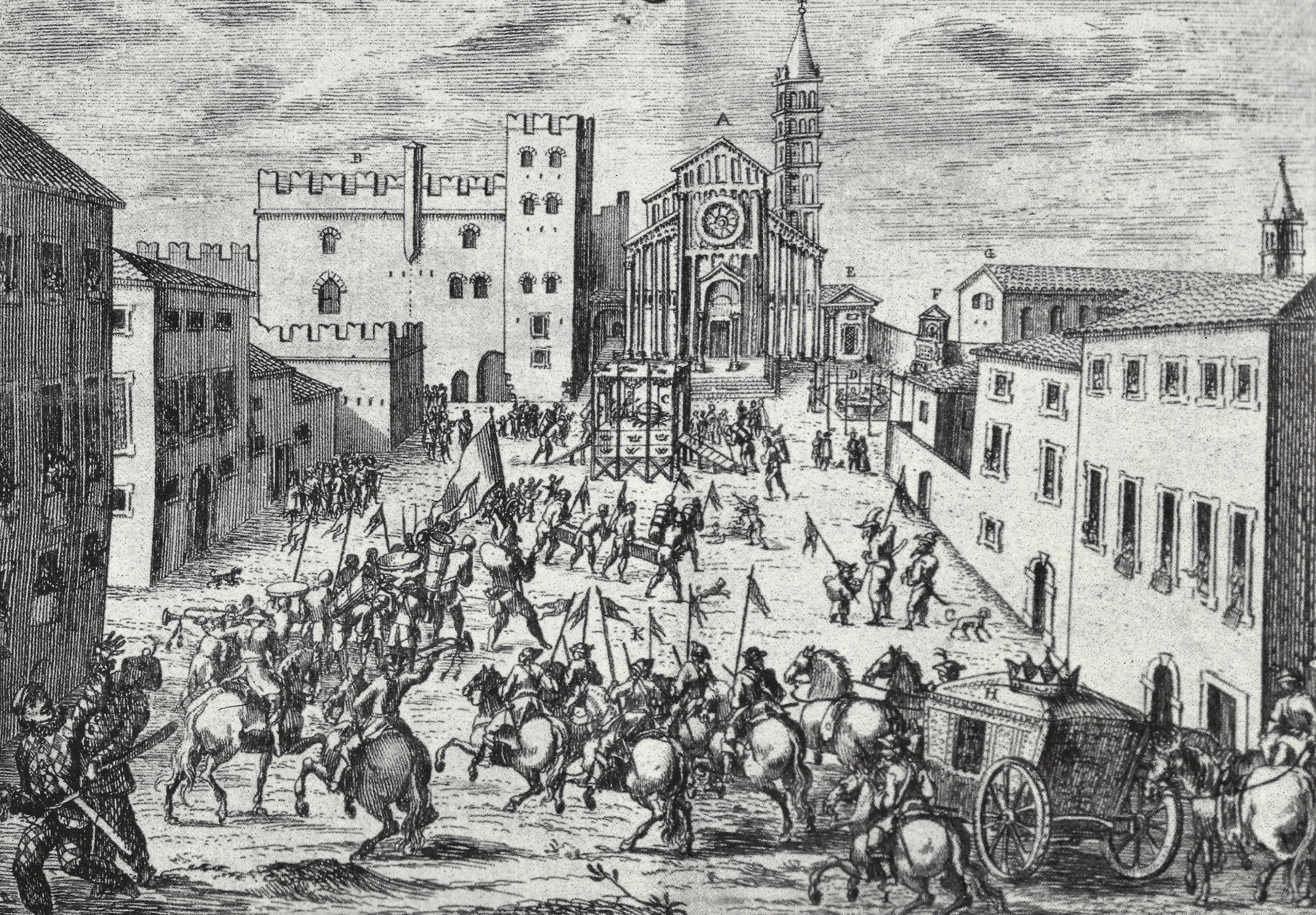
- The Abbey complex of San Zeno in 1770, a few decades before its suppression

- 45.443056°N 10.979167°E
- Location: Verona, Veneto, Italy
- Denomination: Catholic
- Website: https://www.basilicasanzeno.it

Architecture
- Groundbreaking: 9th century

Administration
- Diocese: Diocese of Verona

The Abbey of San Zeno was erected in the 9th century on the remains of a preexisting monastery, whose origins date back to the 4th century. Of the abbey, the abbey tower of San Zeno and several cloisters that are now part of the Basilica of San Zeno survive. It was very important both for the history of Verona and for the relations the German emperors had with Italy.

Historians have ascertained the presence of an early Christian sacellum from the 4th century in the cloisters, now called the sacellum of St. Benedict, however, the construction of the abbey proper was given impetus in the 9th century in the Carolingian era and developed at the behest of the Veronese archdeacon Pacifico, Bishop Rotaldo and the Frankish king Pepin, son of Charlemagne. According to images from the period and recent findings, there was a second tower located to the northeast and the Abbot's palace, adjacent to the abbey tower. Before the extension of the city walls by the Scaligeris, the area of San Zeno was outside the walls and therefore the buildings in the ward were often located so as to be safe and to obtain defense even though they were located outside the city: in that historical phase the ward was thus developed, protected precisely by the presence of the abbey itself.

It was destroyed in the Napoleonic era and therefore did not follow the fate of Verona's abbey properties, which upon the replacement of the French by the Austrians became part of the Austrian state property, sometimes redeemed as in the case of Santa Maria in Organo. From the beginning of the nineteenth century began a period of divestment of the ancient Benedictine abbey that ended in the mid-twentieth century. From the post-war period onward, numerous restoration works were carried out on the tower and part of the original abbey, which can currently be visited and are well maintained.

== History ==
=== Early Christian and Carolingian origins ===
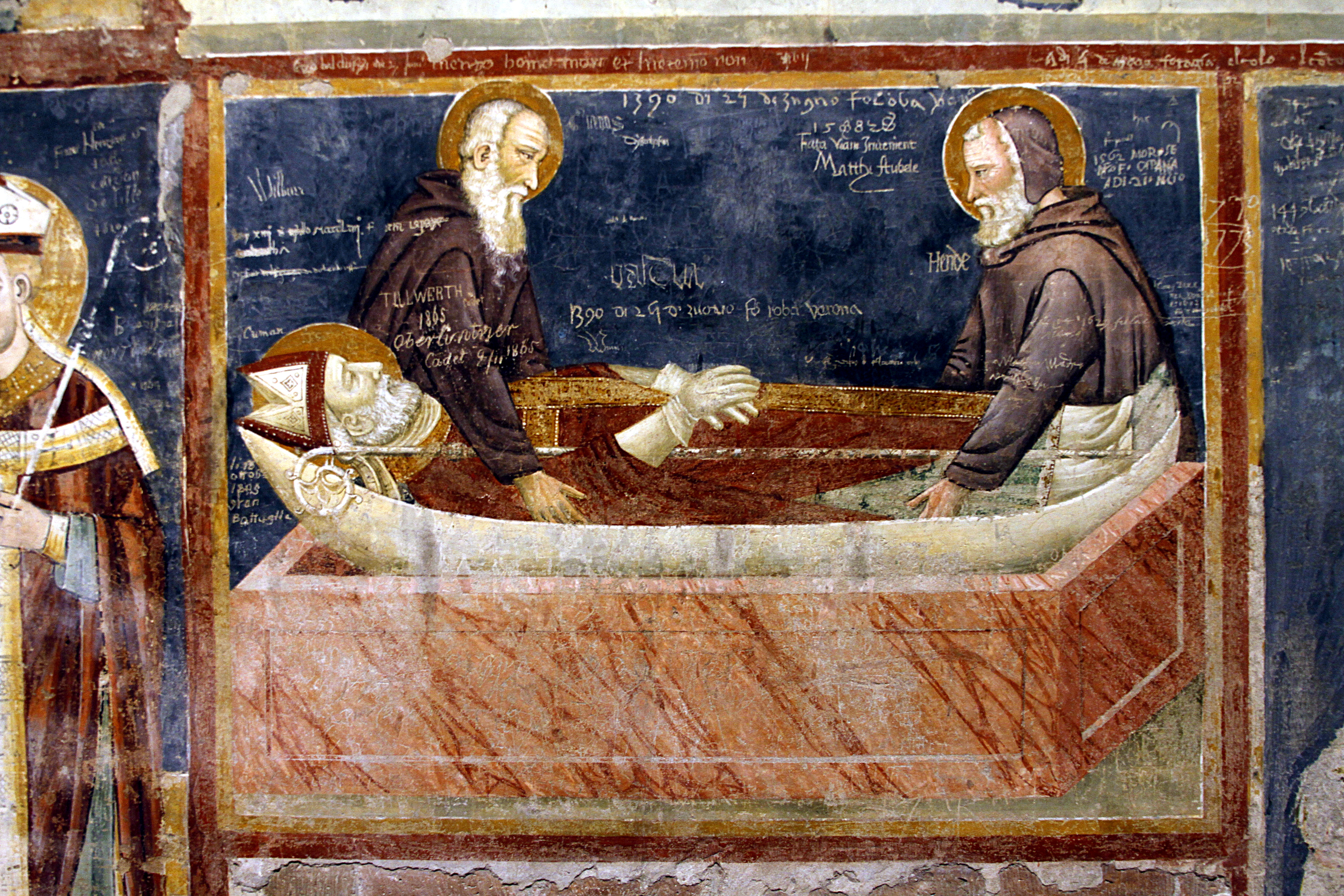
Death of St. Zeno, fresco on the wall of the right aisle of the basilica

There are no sources to trace the foundation of the monastery of St. Zeno in Verona, but it has been speculated that its origin may date as far back as the fourth century, when the saint himself was alive. According to what is recounted in the "Chronicle" of the Veronese notary Coronato, upon the death of St. Zeno (371), an initial church was erected on the site of his tomb, from which the present basilica later developed. According to reports by Giovanni Battista Biancolini beginning in 750 the complex served as an episcopal see for the diocese of Verona until 804, when church and monastery were destroyed "ab infidelibus hominibus," perhaps Huns or Avars but more likely Frankish insubordinates or Arian survivors.

Two years later, King Pepin of Italy and Bishop Ratoldo decided that a new, larger and more worthy building should be built on the site to house the saint's remains. According to what can be read on an inscription placed inside the Verona cathedral, this building was to be overseen, at least in part, by the Archdeacon Pacifico. In the Codice Diplomatico Veronese it is stated that it was Charlemagne himself who confirmed the work. The monastery of San Zeno had in its possession: the monastery of S. Pietro di Mauriatica, the churches of S. Lorenzo di Ostiglia and SS. Firmus and Rusticus.

Once the works were finished, between the end of the 9th century and the beginning of the 10th century, during Carolingian rule, the Benedictine monastery grew in importance, gaining substantial social and economic recognition to the extent that it managed to emancipate itself from the power of the bishop. At this time, and most likely even earlier, the monastery must have been provided with a scriptorium, as was moreover customary in Benedictine monasteries, where the monks were busy copying manuscripts; however, there is no certainty of this until at least 1315, the year in which there is definite evidence of its presence; the debate is still open among historians. (Note: By way of example, it is ascertained that the scriptorium of Verona cathedral was active at least since 517 (perhaps as early as a century earlier), that is, from the date imprinted on the Ursicinus codex preserved here. From that scriptorium originated the capitular library that still exists today and is therefore considered the oldest in the world still in operation. In Parolotto (2002, p. 10).) Not much is known about the books kept there but it is certain that the monks received from Pepin as gifts, in addition to land and objects of worship, "Gospels written in pen all adorned with gold and with precious gems." In addition, in 1940, two manuscripts were found that were certainly part of the monastery's library, Justinian's Institutiones and St. Augustine's Tractatus in Ioannis evangelium, with the latter being annotated "Liber monasterii Sancti Zenonis Maioris de Verona." It is likely that it was there, between the 11th and 12th centuries, that an anonymous monk wrote Vita S. Zenonis and Historia translationis S. Zenonis.

=== Late medieval period ===
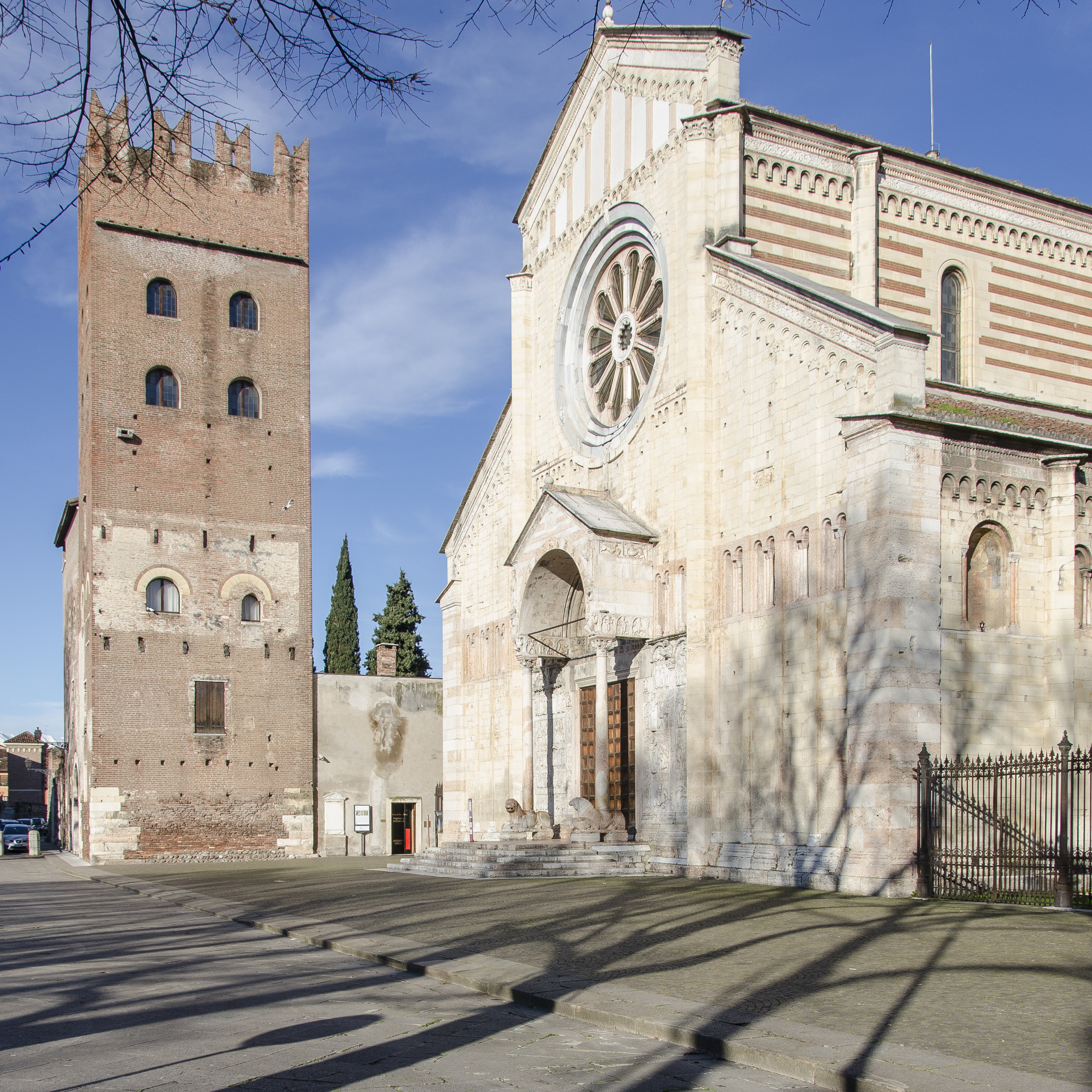
Abbey tower, here Frederick II of Swabia probably stayed on the occasion of the wedding of his daughter Selvaggia to Ezzelino III da Romano, celebrated on May 23, 1238.

The devastating 1117 earthquake that struck the city did not spare even the San Zeno complex, which sustained extensive damage. In spite of this, the monastery continued to grow throughout the 12th century and was promptly rebuilt in the forms and dimensions that still distinguish it today, according to the taste of the Veronese Romanesque style in vogue at the time. The prosperity enjoyed by the monastery was a consequence both of the gifts it received from the faithful and the diocese, but also and above all of the numerous privileges granted to it by the various emperors over the centuries, first by the Carolingians, then by the Ottonians, and then by the Hohenstaufen; the last one of which is known was issued by Frederick II of Swabia in 1221. The emperors also often used, at least since the descent of Otto I of Saxony in 969, the Benedictine monastery of San Zeno as a place to stay.

By the end of the 12th century, however, the monastery's downward spiral began despite attempts by Abbot Gerard (1163-1187) and Abbot Hugh (1187-1199) to secure its former prestige. Nevertheless, the crisis became apparent in all its drama when Abbot Riprando was killed by his own brother, the cleric Avanzo.

In 1226 Ezzelino III da Romano seized power in Verona and throughout the March of Treviso, subjugating even the religious community of San Zeno, creating rifts within them that manifested themselves in a substantial loss of autonomy in favor of the lay members of the municipality. On May 23, 1238, the sumptuous wedding between Frederick II's daughter Selvaggia and Ezzelino took place in the basilica; it is most likely that the emperor resided for the occasion within the abbey tower.

To counter the oppressive Ezzelinian power tried Abbot Peter, who led the monastery between 1252 and 1268, flanked by a single monk, a certain Cloza, but this attempt was unsuccessful. During the communal period the carroccio of the municipality of Verona was kept inside the church of San Zeno, precisely at the beginning of the left aisle. With the coming to power of the Scaligeri, the autonomy of the convent was further reduced, so much so that, in 1292, Alberto I della Scala was able to impose his illegitimate son Giuseppe as abbot, instead of a "real" abbot; in this regard Dante Alighieri mentions Giuseppe in Canto XVIII of Purgatory condemning him to Hell, a judgment that historians consider far too harsh, considering that Giovanni worked to increase the number of monks present, revised the documentation and began work on the new abbey palace and the present cloister. The affair came up again in 1321 when Bartolomeo I della Scala, natural son of Mastino I and later bishop of Verona, was placed at the head of the Benedictines of San Zeno.

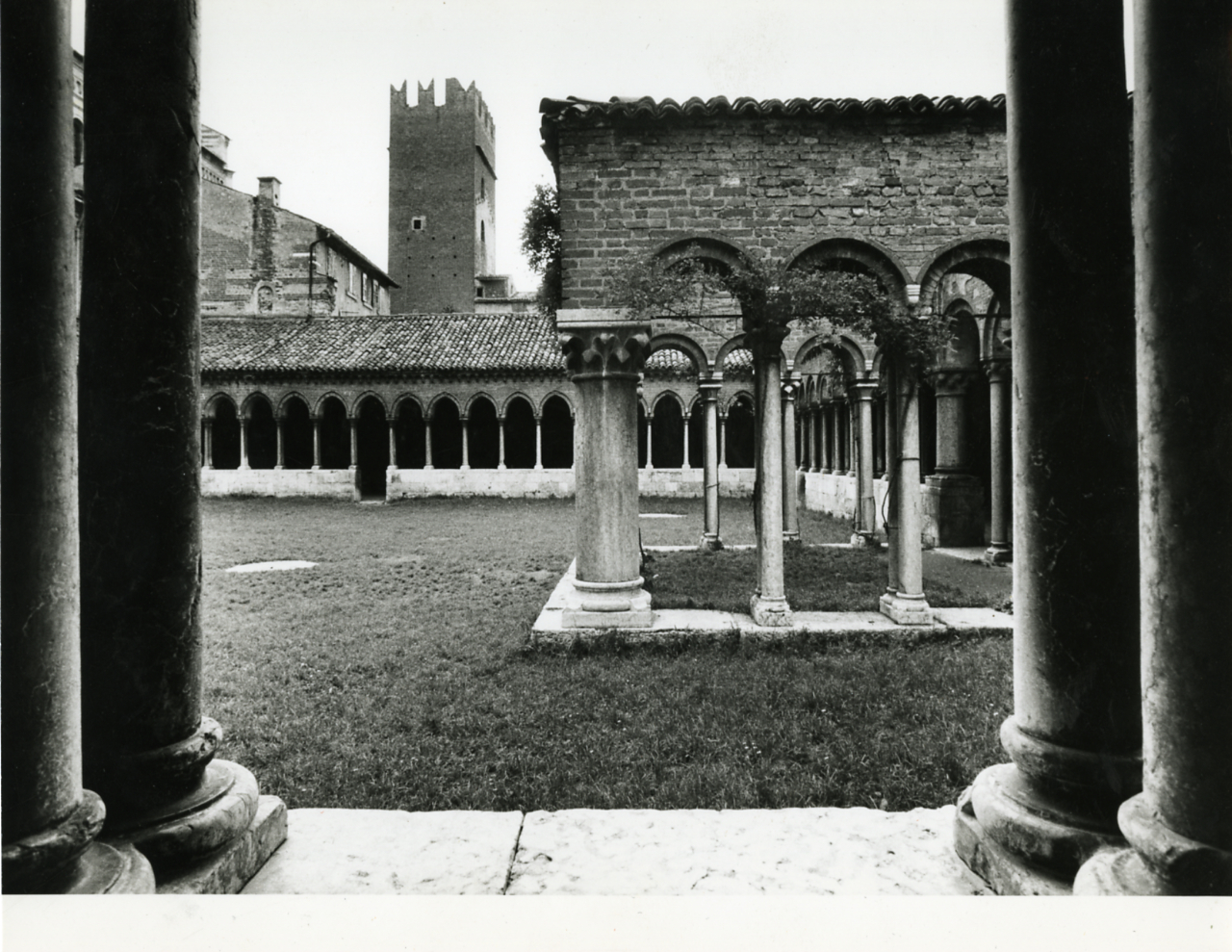
The abbey cloister, whose construction was begun by Abbot Giuseppe della Scala, in a 1972 photograph by Paolo Monti

In 1318, a document, written in Gothic Chancery script, brings knowledge of the presence in the abbey library of 29 codices and other religious goods. Since this document mentions only religious objects, concerning the handover between monks, it is unknown whether works of a secular nature were also preserved at that time. Among the various codices mentioned are two texts from the Historia Corporis Christi, two codices with accounts of the Miracles of St. Zeno, two concerning the Benedictine order of which a Liber comenti super regulam, three missals, one of which belonged to Bishop Adelardo, probably Adelardo Cattaneo from the early 12th century. (Note: The codex simply reads "missale quod fuit episcopi Abelardi," so historians are leaning toward Adelardo Cattaneo instead of his namesake Adalardo of Verona, bishop between the 9th and 10th centuries. In Parolotto (2002, p. 8).)

A second inventory of codices contained in the monastery, listing 131 of them, is instead dated May 12, 1400, and was compiled by the Brescian Giovanni De Lantanis, a student of liberal arts at Sorbonne in Paris, at the behest of Pietro Emilei, abbot of San Zeno between 1399 and 1421.

These inventories allow one to assume that throughout the 14th century the scriptorium was in full activity and was also directed to provide a service for private individuals in addition to that related to worship; it has even been proposed that many of the amanuenses were laymen or at least not monks. What is certain is that in 1425 German monks made their appearance within the monastery and took charge of the copying work.

=== Modern Age ===
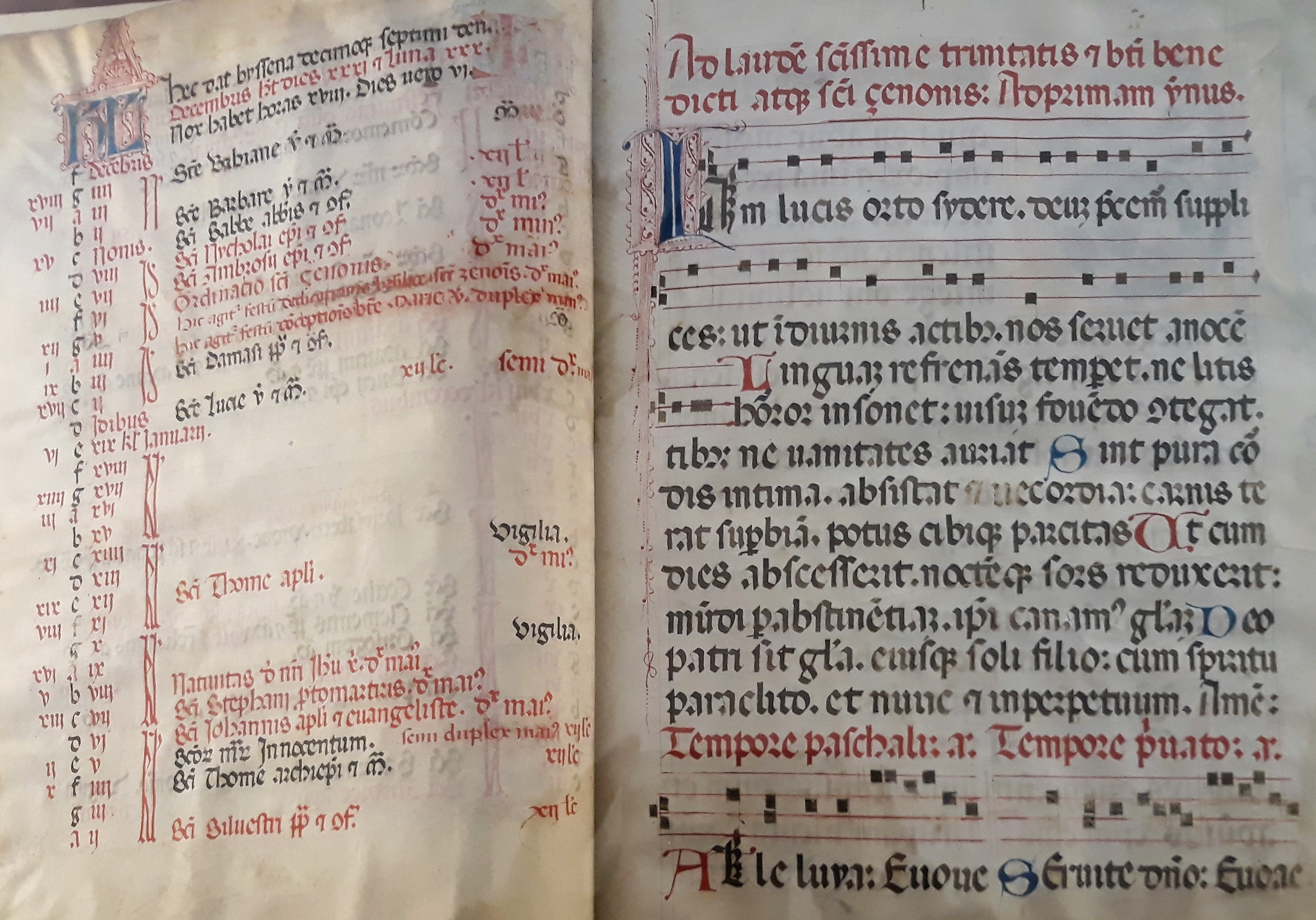
Breviary in use in the Abbey of San Zeno in the 15th century and now housed in the Verona Civic Library (ms 745)

In the meantime, the Scaliger dynasty had fallen and, after a brief Visconti interlude that did not change the life of the monastery, there was the devotion of Verona to Venice pronounced on June 24, 1405. Following this there was a loss of power on the part of the local aristocracy in favor of the officials of the Serenissima, a fact that also affected, albeit indirectly, the San Zeno complex. Beginning in 1425, with the appointment of Marco Emilei by Pope Martin V, the period of commendatory abbots no longer residing in the monastery began. The new abbot, however, worked to revitalize the functioning of the monastery by ordering the separation of the abbatial and monastic refectories, stipulating that the resident monks should never be less than twelve (while the lay brothers should be at least three in number), that a chapter should be held every May 1 to elect a prior with an annual charge, and that the abbot should not intervene in the administration of temporal goods. Among the deeds arranged by Emilei it is stated with regard to the library, "cum loco ibidem pro Libraria," that it was located in a room situated between the granary and the bakery demonstrating that the number of codices was so great that they could no longer be kept in the sacristy.

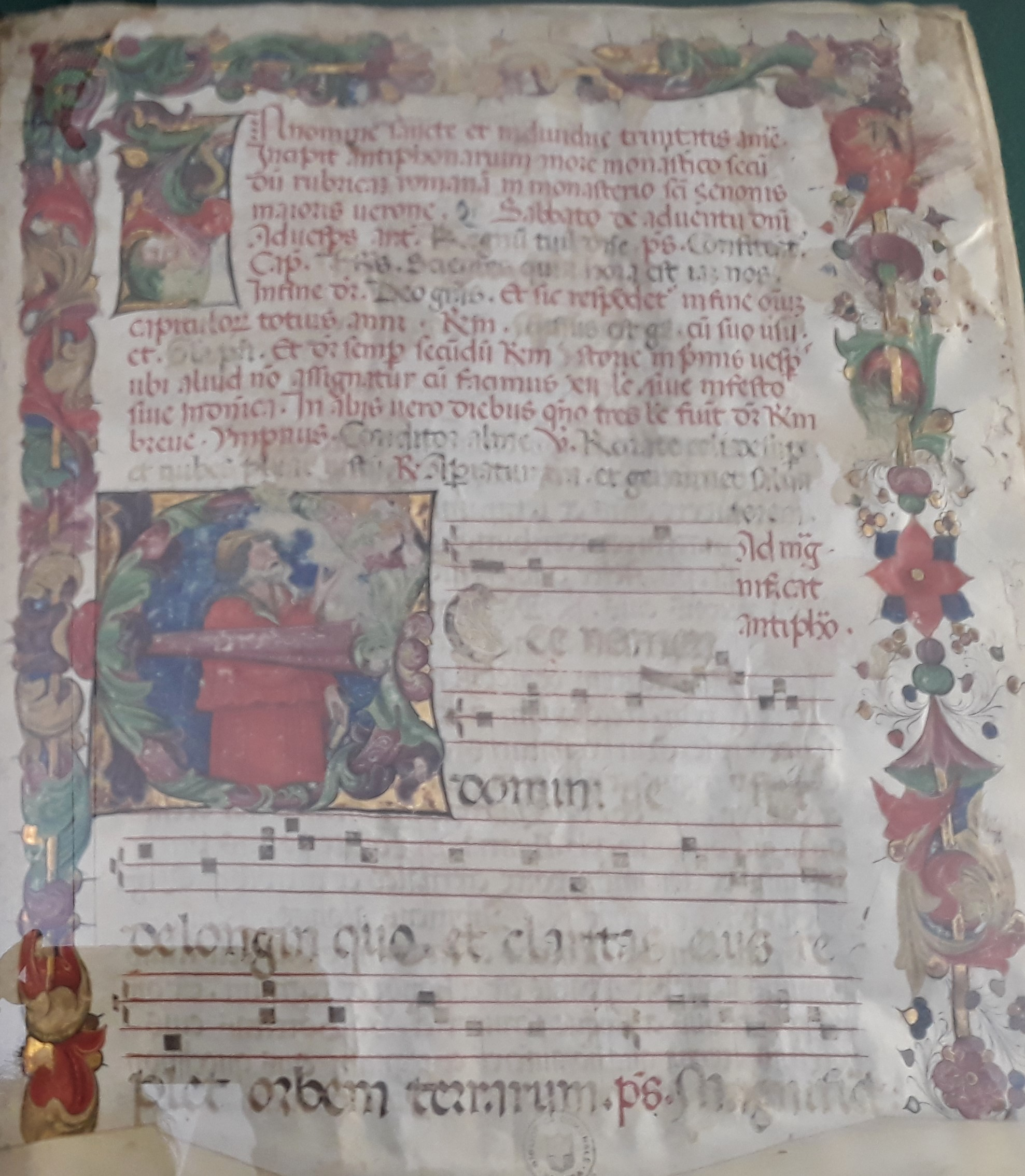
Antiphonary in use at San Zeno Abbey in the 16th century and now housed in the Verona Civic Library (ms 741)

In 1433 the Camaldolese Ambrogio Traversari had occasion to speak of the monastery's library, describing it as "sacroru, voluminum copiosa." It was also to grow considerably between 1445 and 1464 when the commendatory abbot was Gregorio Correr, a great supporter of culture and the commissioner of Mantegna's San Zeno Altarpiece, which is still preserved inside the church. In 1472, called with the intention of strengthening the adherence to the Benedictine rule that was to be observed, more German monks arrived in the monastery who also took charge of collecting more manuscripts.

Relations between the monks and the Germans, however, soured to the extent that the former even went so far as to destroy Verona's carroccio. Of them the commendatory abbot (1567-1577) Giovanni Francesco Commendone also had occasion to note bad behavior, who on the occasion of a visit spoke of "disciplinam regularem in hoc Monasterio esse valde depravatam, ac fere collapsam [. ..] Preterea graves excessus in Monasterio factos fuisse" consequently having to promote a "Reformatio monachorum S. Zenoni."

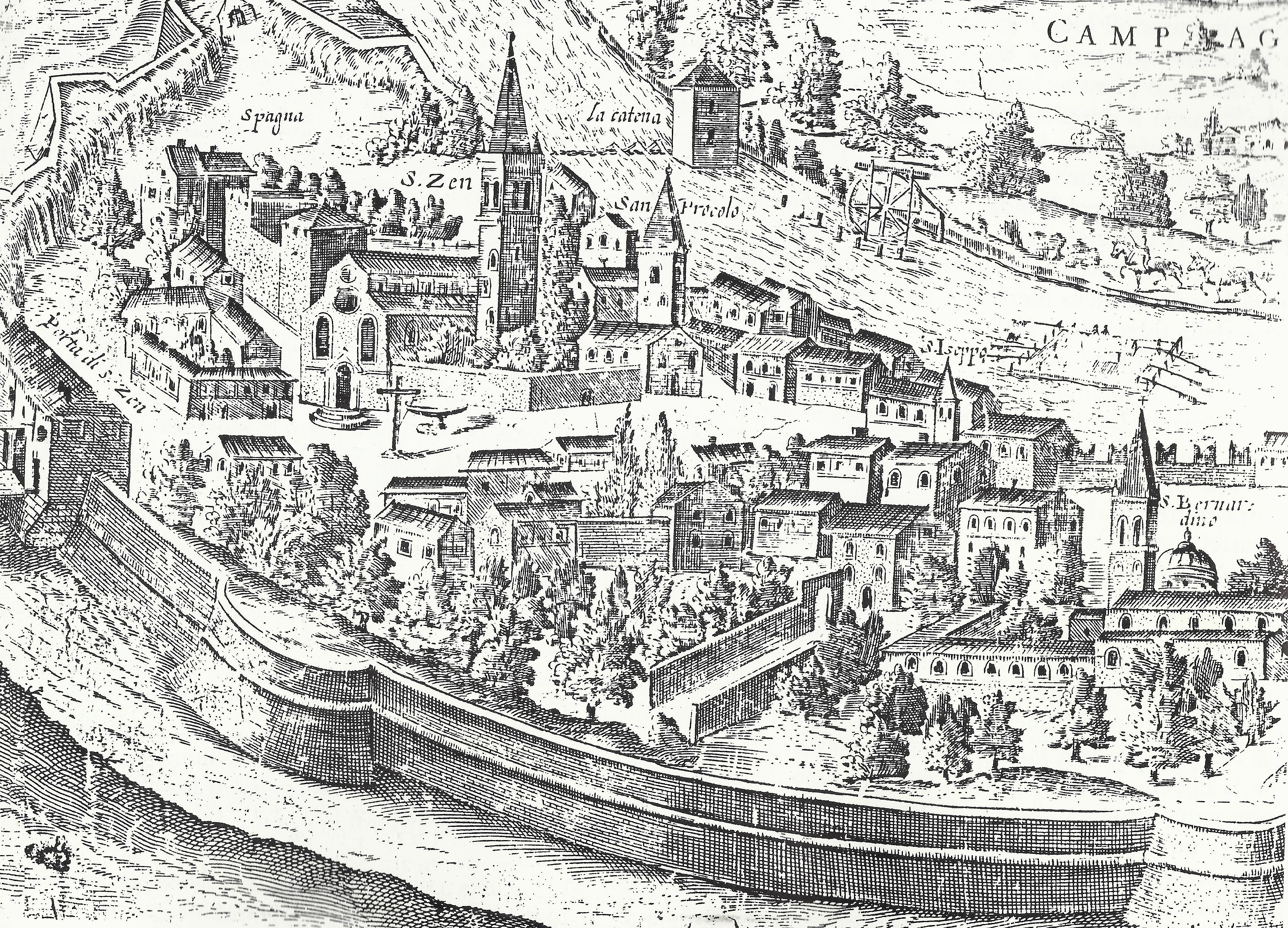
The abbey in a drawing by Paolo Ligozzi made around the 17th century

It was only the plague of 1630, however, that finally drove the German monks away from San Zeno. The terrible epidemic spared only a certain Leonardo and the priests Giovanni Galingh and Mauro Haymb. The survivors first proposed to recall more Germans in order to bring the number of monks back to the minimum of twelve, as previously established. It was, however, the commendatory abbot Pietro Contarini who opposed this idea by introducing four Vallombrosian monks into San Zeno from the nearby church of the Holy Trinity and going so far as to accuse Don Mauro of stealing documents, thus having him imprisoned. Back at liberty, the German priest began a bitter battle to return to San Zeno, which ended with his assassination in 1637 in Mantua at the hands of an assassin. From that time the Serenissima issued a decree forbidding the entry of any foreign monk into the monastery of San Zeno.

=== The end of the abbey ===
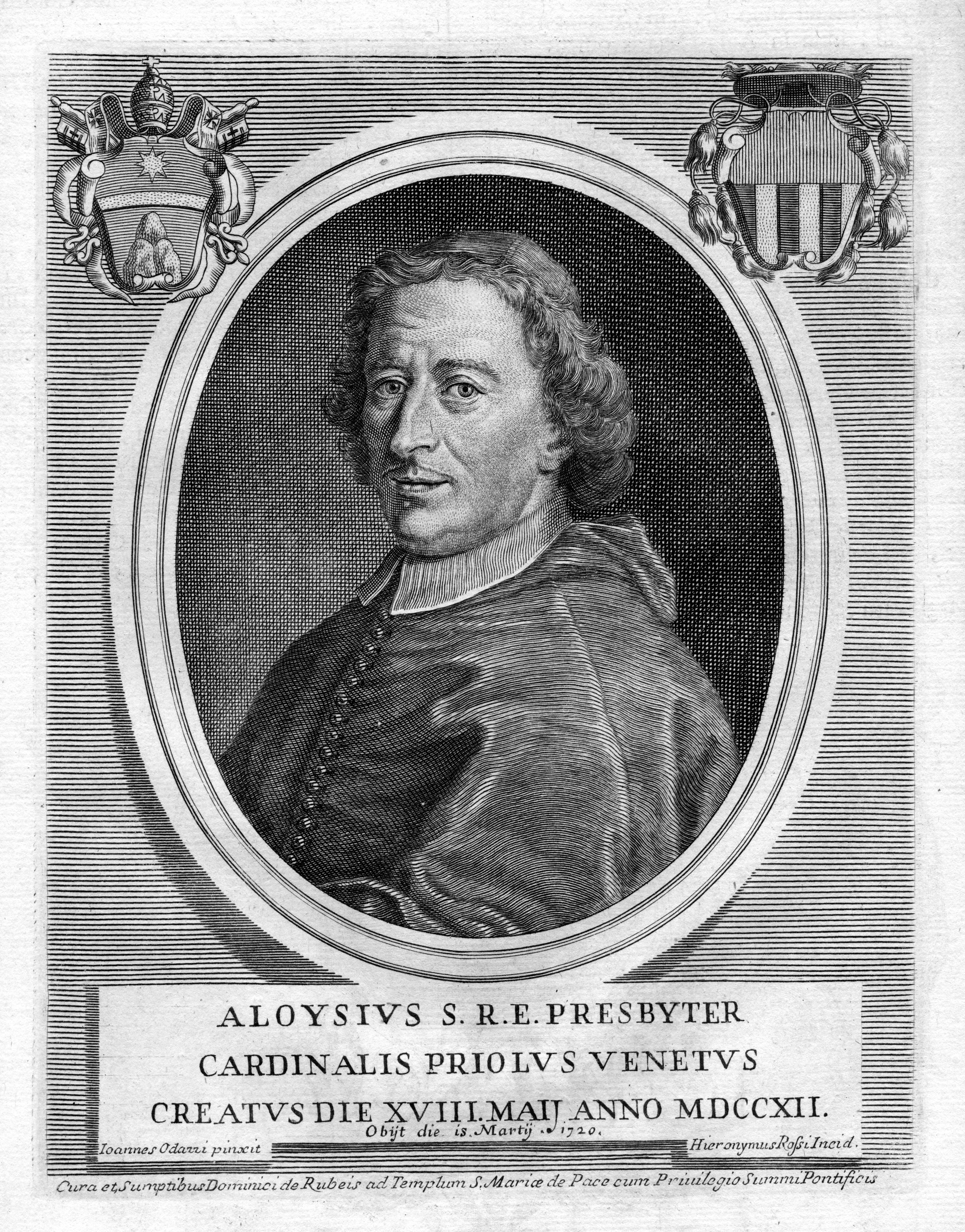
Cardinal Luigi Priuli, benefactor of the abbey

In 1684 Cardinal Luigi Priuli assumed the position of commendatory abbot, which he held until his death in 1720. Thanks to him the monastery received several donations and even at the point of death he remembered St. Zeno so much that he left many of his books to the monastery in his will, as well as asking that his heart could be buried in front of the high altar, a wish that was granted and still today it is possible to see a black marble slab where he was buried. On the entrance door of the monastery library the monks placed an epigraph to commemorate Priuli's generosity to them, on which is written "PRAECLARUM HUIUS BIBLIOTHECAE CUM DOTE // UNCREMENTUM ALOYSII CARD. PRIULUS AB. // COM. EX TEST. MUNUS XVI MARTII MDCCXX."

A few years later the monastery's library continued to expand thanks to another bequest, this time from the Veronese Ludovico Perini, who in his will, drawn up on January 14, 1731, donated all his books.

On December 5, 1770, the Venetian Senate issued a decree mandating the suppression of four Benedictine monasteries, including that of San Zeno in Verona. (Note: In addition to the one at San Zeno, the one at San Nicolò al Lido, Busco Abbey, and the one at Santi Nazaro e Celso in Verona were suppressed. In Parolotto (2002, p. 39).) Initially it was planned to move the library's books to the Basilica of San Giorgio Maggiore in Venice but, due to the opposition of some Veronese citizens, they were allowed to remain in place so that a "Public Library" could be founded. According to reports in the treatise Beschreibung Verschiedener Biblioteken in Europe by the priest and librarian Adalbert Blumenschein (c. 1720–1781), it seems that this library was still in the convent and was only rarely accessible to scholars, perhaps only twice every three months.

In 1771 the municipality of Verona purchased the monastery for 2,400 ducats and it was decided to move the library to a more central location in the city. With the subsequent acquisition of the church of San Sebastiano, this intention could be acted upon, and so in 1792 the Civic Library of Verona was born on the basis of the book collection from the monastery. Finally, in 1797, as a result of Napoleonic rule, the suppression of the abbey refectory of San Zeno was finally sanctioned.

== The possessions of the abbey ==
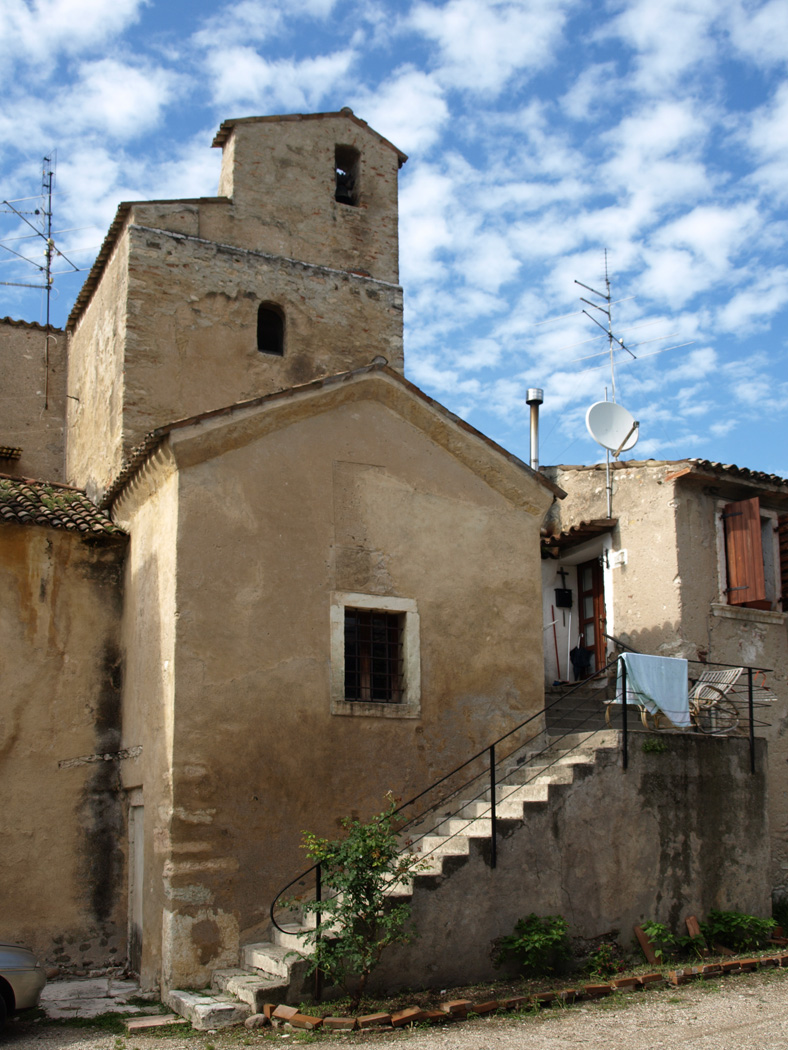
The Church of San Zeno in Bardolino, one of the abbey's properties

The Benedictine monastery of San Zeno was already richly endowed in the ninth century, but in the following century it greatly increased its holdings and proceeded on most of them to encastellation. A privilege of Emperor Henry II the Holy in 1014 allows one to know the exact extent of the territories over which the abbey had jurisdiction at that time: the villages of Ostiglia and Villimpenta with adjacent woods, the castles of Moratica (today in the municipality of Sorgà), Erbé, Trevenzuolo, Vigasio and Romagnano, plus several scattered properties, even substantial ones, such as in Bardolino. Two other diplomas of the same century also confirmed the properties of the castles of Montecchio di Fumane, Pastrengo, Capavo (in the municipality of Negrar) and "Isola Nonense." Around the basilica, moreover, came to form over time the settlement of the same name over which Emperor Henry IV, in 1084, gave full jurisdiction to the monastery; the territory was much larger than just the village but extended from the (destroyed) church of San Martino Acquario, on which Castelvecchio would later be built, to Chievo.

Less prosperous was the 13th century, when a deep crisis hit the monastery, from which it managed to emerge owing to the interventions of the princes of Verona, the Della Scala family, and the abbot Giuseppe della Scala, who undertook to reconstitute the patrimony and reorganize the administration of the estates. In spite of this, towards the end of the 14th century, when the Della Scala seigniory came to an end, the lands subject to the abbey were now a small part compared to those of the communal age. In the fifteenth century the situation did not change substantially, however San Zeno still managed to hold jurisdiction over Erbé, Roncolevà, Trevenzuolo, Moratica, Pigozzo, Romagnano and Cellore, though from this century on the jurisdictions, better known as vicariates, no longer allowed the abbot to possess a political, administrative and military role, as had been the case in previous centuries, instead remaining simply a source of income, limited by the Venetian government and the interference of the municipality of Verona.

=== The possessions on Mount Baldo ===
There is little information about the monastery's possessions on Mount Baldo during the Lombard and early medieval ages. Between the 9th and 10th centuries San Zeno owned lands on Lake Garda, but these were the curtis of Meleto in Bardolino and the curtis of Lazise, both located in the areas south of Mount Baldo.

However, some sources mention as part of the territories of the monastery of San Zeno a locality called Vallis Trusa or Strusa, which is most likely a mountainous area of Baldo overlooking Caprino Veronese. In Carolingian times this land was owned by the royal treasury, but in about 810 Pepin, son of Charlemagne, donated it to San Zeno. In a placitum of 880 the Vallis Strusa is precisely considered to be the property of the monastery: this is a dispute between the latter and a private individual, Rotekario, who allegedly illegally grazed his animals in this area belonging not to him but to the monastery. Finally, in a 1221 diploma by Frederick II, he confirms San Zeno's possession of Valle Trusa and Costa Blota, that is, the part of Mount Baldo immediately above Caprino. Thus the so-called Valle Strusa seems to have been part of the lands of the monastery of San Zeno as early as the 9th century.

Some lands in Brenzone and Malcesine also belonged to the property of the monastery of San Zeno since the 9th century, and remained in its possession until the 12th century, as evidenced by Frederick I's diploma of 1162 and other diplomas of the 11th-12th centuries. Even in the 13th century they are under the control of the monastery: this is clear from the fact that land-renting activities in these areas by it are documented in even more detail than in the earlier period. In general, however, there is little written documentation for the entire medieval period, especially on Malcesine.

There are, however, some more detailed references regarding Brenzone. In Henry II's diploma of 1014 the church of S. Vito in Curia Venti, i.e., in the present locality of Porto di Brenzone, appears as a possession of San Zeno. A document from 1023 shows that there were some employees of the monastery in Campo di Brenzone, and some area in this locality continued to be part of its possessions even in the 12th century. According to some twelfth-century documents there is in Borago (another locality in the territory of Brenzone) a curtis belonging to San Zeno. The church of San Zeno di Castelletto in Brenzone (known as San Zeno de l'Uselet), on the other hand, was not part of the Verona monastery's possessions.

Also belonging to the possessions of San Zeno were some lands in Caprino Veronese, according to some 11th-century diplomas, and in Gaium (a locality of Rivoli Veronese), according to the 1162 diploma of Frederick I. In 1194 an inventory of possessions was drawn up by the monastery, among which precisely the localities of Caprino and its hamlet Pazzon appear. Also in this period, between 1193 and 1195, San Zeno leased some fields on Mount Blotus, probably to be located in the vicinity of Pazzon. At the end of the 12th century, the monastery collected goods from Malcesine and Brenzone, in addition to the oft-mentioned locality of Pazzon.

The church of San Zeno in Bardolino, dependent on the monastery of San Zeno in Verona, had in turn possessions in Caprino, Boi (Caprino Veronese), and Mount Blotus between the 12th and 13th centuries.

Thirteenth-century documents reporting canon payments to San Zeno show that among the lands leased (and thus belonging to the monastery) appear the localities of Malcesine and Brenzone and Castion (Costermano). In those of the fourteenth century there are Marciaga and Castion (both located in Costermano) and again Brenzone. In a register of 1309, moreover, there are properties located in Caprino. As can be seen then, the latter, together with Brenzone, is one of the areas most closely linked in the medieval period to San Zeno's possessions on Mount Baldo.

== Surviving buildings ==
=== Church ===
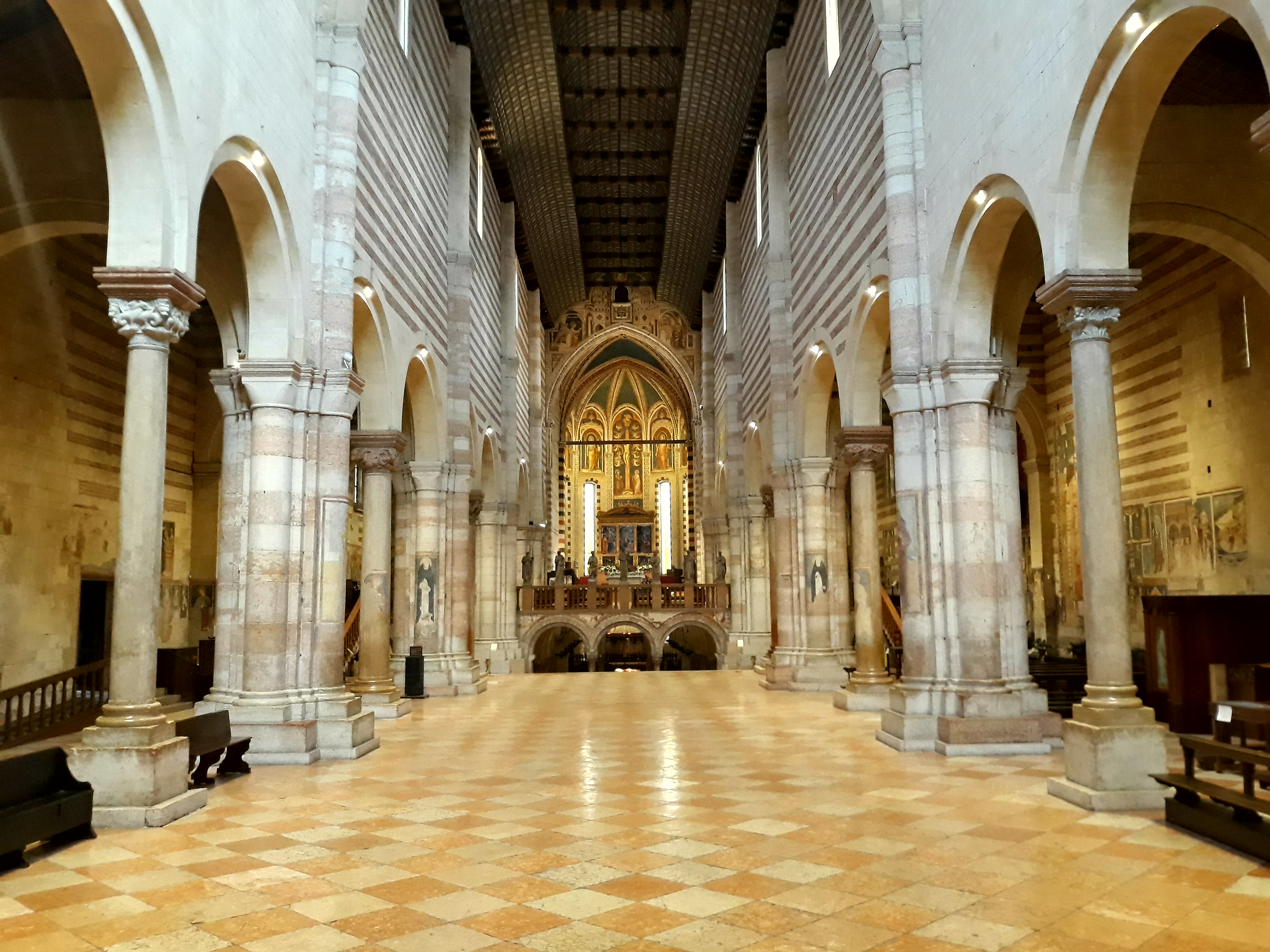
Interior of the church, note the rood screen dividing the hall from the raised chancel. Passing through the three arches, one reaches the crypt.

The present church, built on the site where at least five other religious buildings had previously stood, maintains its medieval origin substantially unaltered, representing an example of Veronese Romanesque architecture. The interior has a basilica plan with the hall divided into three naves by two rows of mighty pillars with a cruciform section alternating with columns. The ceiling is wooden in the shape of a ship's hull with refined decorations and was made between 1385 and 1389. Originally the interior walls were to be entirely covered with frescoes, of which only portions remain today. Critics mostly tend to attribute them to a first and a second "master of San Zeno", actually two groups of fresco painters working in the city in the second quarter and second half of the 14th century, respectively. The painters Martino da Verona and Altichiero da Zevio, or at least pupils of their school, have been proposed as the authors of additional frescoes. On the right aisle is an altarpiece by Francesco Torbido.

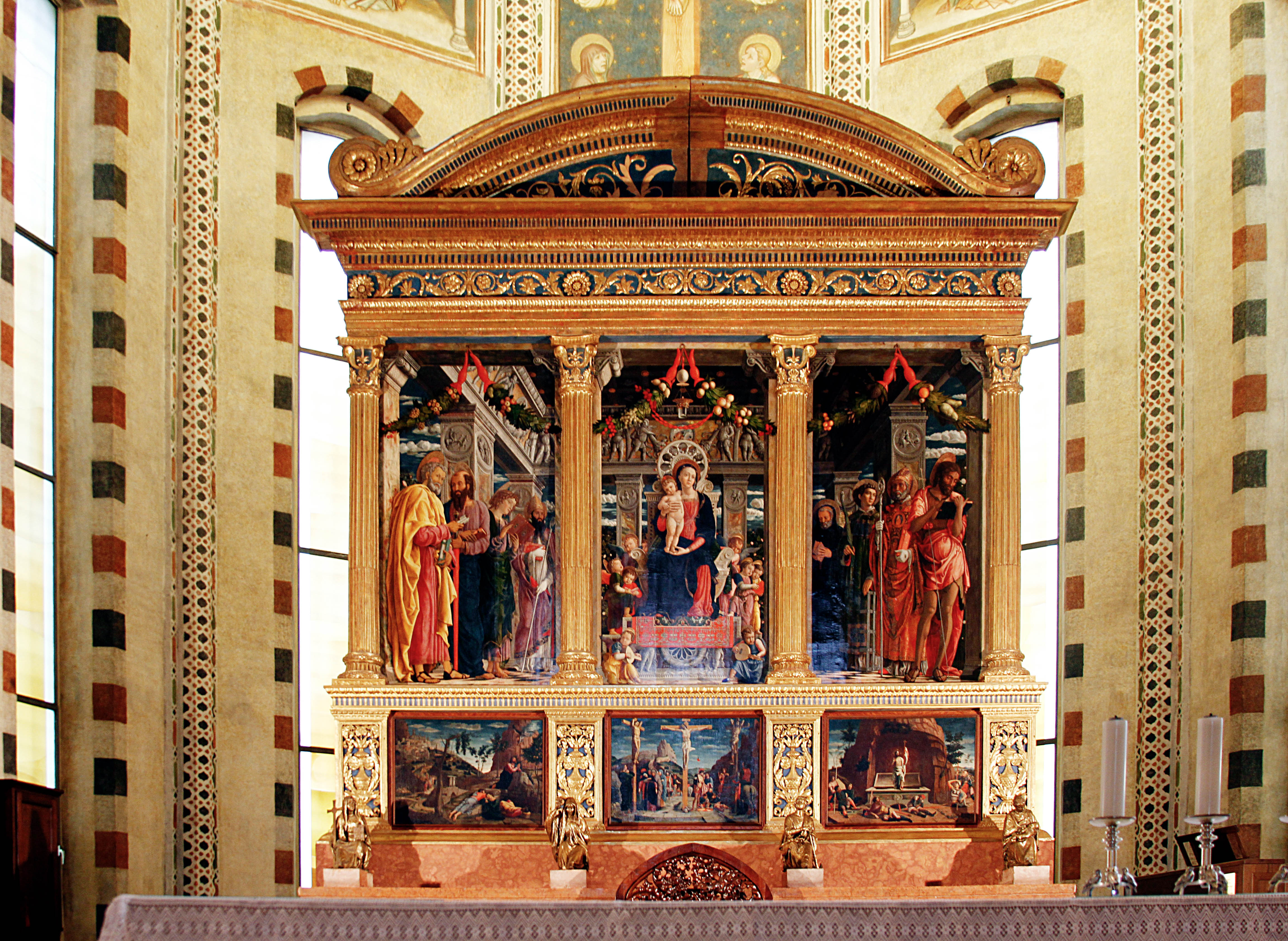
Altarpiece of San Zeno by Andrea Mantegna

The chancel is located at a higher level than the nave and is accessed by two stairways that pass a rood screen decorated with statues. Behind the high altar, made by reusing the sarcophagus of Saints Lupicino, Lucillus, and Crescentianus, is the altarpiece of St. Zeno by the Mantuan painter Andrea Mantegna. In the small left apse there is, on the other hand, a statue of St. Zeno laughing, dated around the 13th century, which has aroused interest among critics because of its original depiction of the subject. Below the chancel, at the lowest level of the entire building, there is a large crypt whose ceiling consists of 54 rib vaults supported by arches resting on 49 columns.

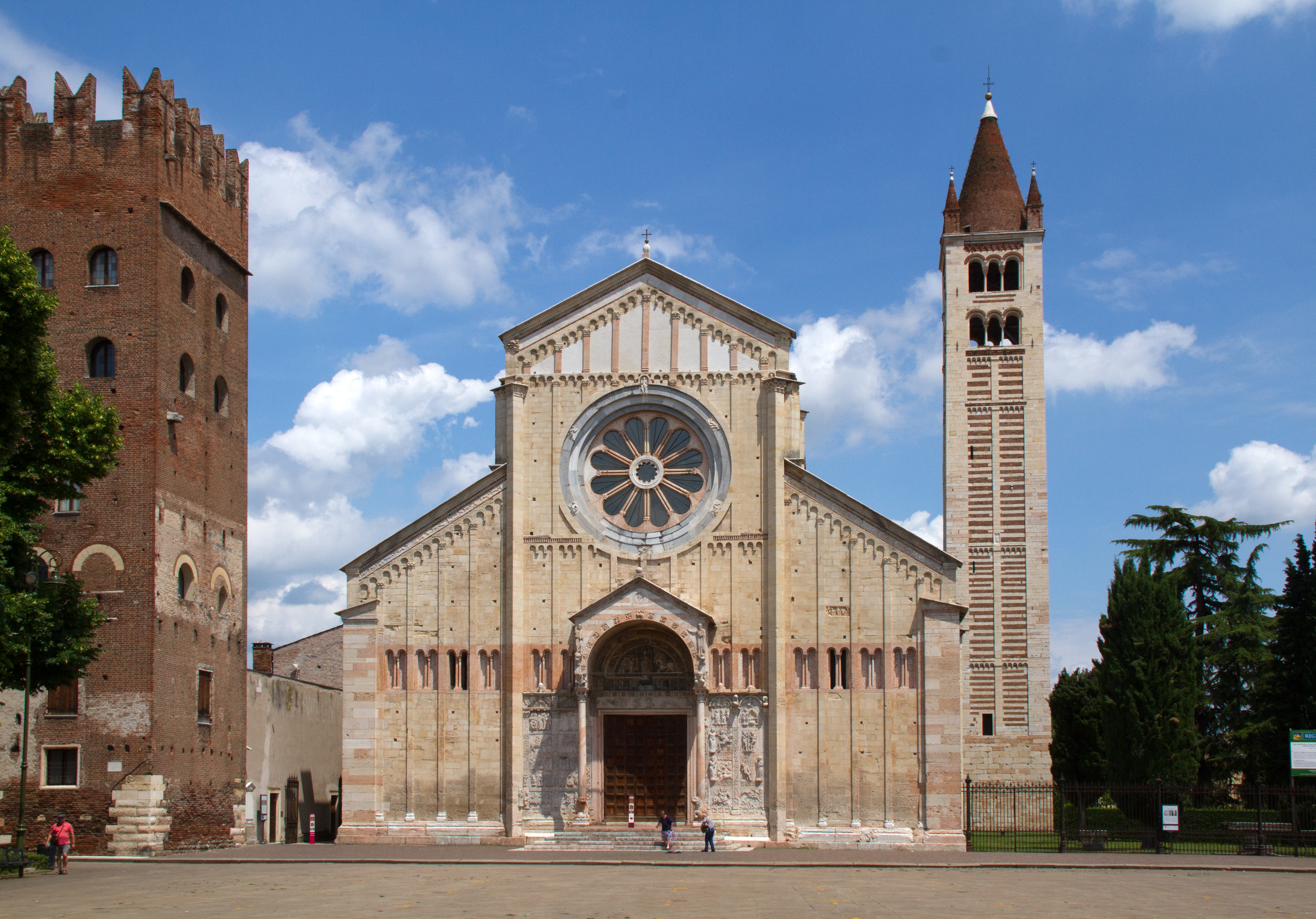
Façade of the basilica

Also noteworthy are the bronze panels on the portal, the work of several medieval master foundrymen, and the large rose window on the facade, called the "Wheel of Fortune", made by the stone mason Brioloto de Balneo. Also on the facade, noteworthy are the bas-reliefs on either side of the portal: those on the left are attributed to master Guglielmo and his helpers, while those on the right belong to master Niccolo and his school. Inside the lunette of the prothyrum there is an additional bas-relief depicting the Consecration of the Veronese Municipality, which, in addition to its artistic value, is also an important historical document that allows one to attest to the birth of the Veronese medieval municipality in 1138, the date of the work's completion.

Construction work on the present bell tower began in 1045 with Abbot Alberico and ended around 1178 through the intervention of "master Martino". It was therefore a long construction site interrupted only by the 1117 earthquake, which was followed by restoration in 1120. It rests on an imposing rectangular plinth made of ashlars of living stone. The use of stone continues above the plinth, both in the corners of the barrel and in the central pilaster of each face, while in the space between these there is an alternating use of tuff and terracotta courses. The belfry has two overlapping orders of triforas on each side and, since 1498, has housed six bells, the largest of which, cast in 1423, weighs close to a ton. Of the older bells all that remains is the small octagonal one with no inscription, known as "del figar". The barrel ends in smooth tuff moldings. Finally, on its corners stand four pinnacles all made of brick; the large central pine cone is also made entirely of brick.

=== Abbey tower ===
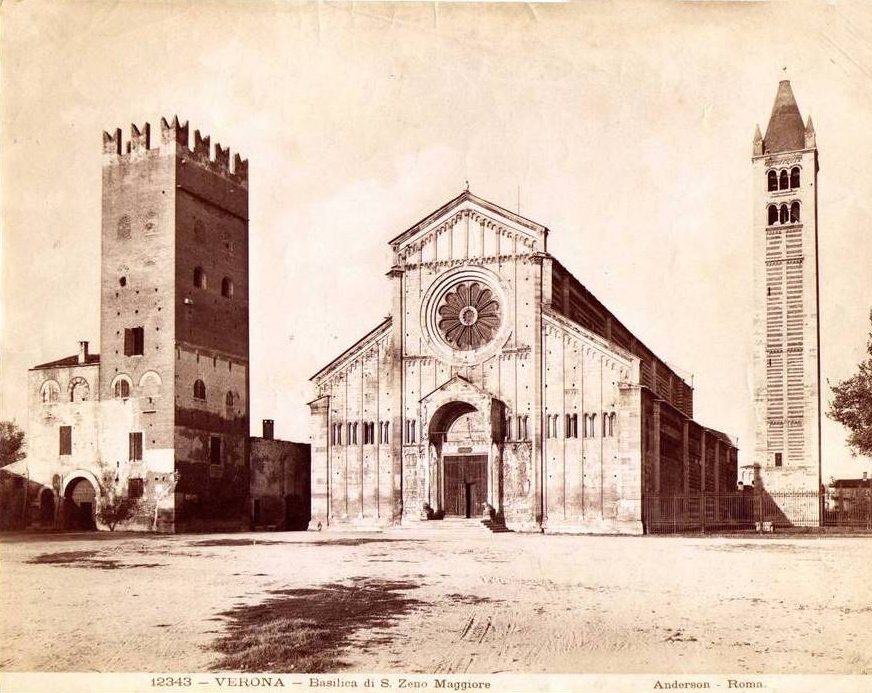
The San Zeno complex with the abbey tower in a 19th century photograph

The construction of the tower, which is first mentioned in two documents from 1169, took place in at least two different phases: most likely the first building can be dated to the 12th century, while in the following century the elevation took place, as can be seen from the bricks used, of different quality in the two areas, and from the characters of the windows, with tuff ferrules at the bottom and terracotta at the top.

In the 14th century a second building was leaned against it along the northern wall, so tall that it almost went to cover the balcony of the third floor of the tower. This second building, also known as the "Abbot's palace", was partially demolished in the early 19th century, so today the remaining part is showing one floor less and half the length of the first building. This complex, which had the access to the monastery on the ground floor, was intended for the abbot and the most prestigious guests, as the abbey until even the 14th century served as a hotel for the emperors of the Holy Roman Empire.

Inside the complex is an original painting depicting a procession of various peoples on their way to pay homage to a ruler, with a turreted city in the background. This is a rather unusual painting because of the flashy headdresses that make the different peoples distinguishable, but also because of the difficulties of iconographic interpretation and the unique painting technique used. In addition, there is a fragment of a fresco depicting the lower part of a "Wheel of Fortune", with a clinging human figure and the inscription "sum sine regno", the same subject found in the rose window placed on the facade of the Basilica of San Zeno, a work executed between the end of the 12th century and the beginning of the following century by master Brioloto de Balneo.

=== Cloister ===
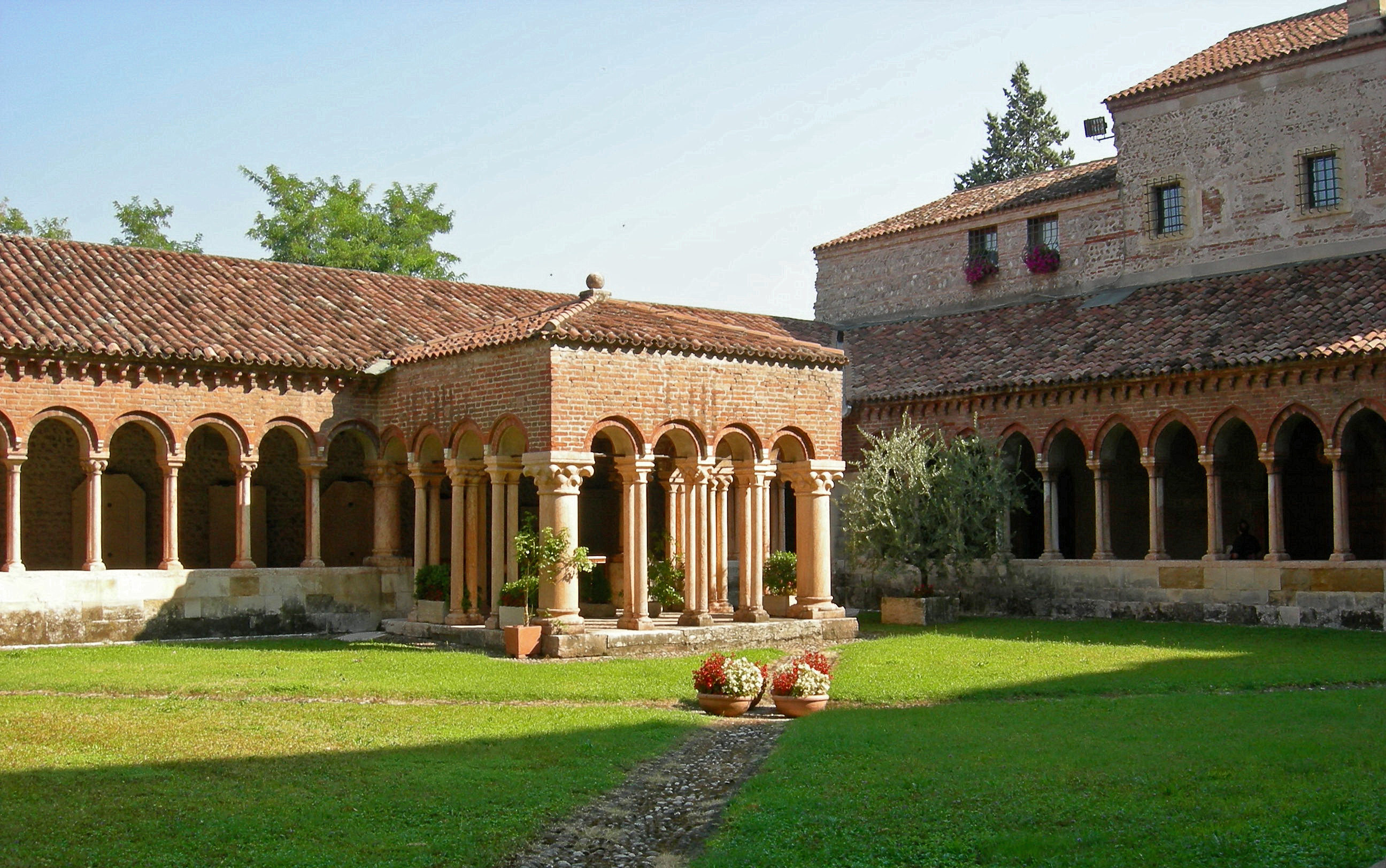
Cloister of the abbey with the projecting aedicule where the well was once located

The earliest record of the cloister's presence dates it to the 10th century but its present arrangement is due to a renovation carried out between 1293 and 1313. The four sides are formed by small pointed arches on two sides and round arches on two others, supported by paired columns made of red Verona marble. On the northern side protrudes a quadrangular aedicule in which the ancient abbey well was located. On the perimeter walls of the ambulatories are placed sarcophagi and tombstones, among which the tomb of Giuseppe della Scala stands out, dating from 1313 and enriched by a lunette with a fresco by a painter of the Giotto school.

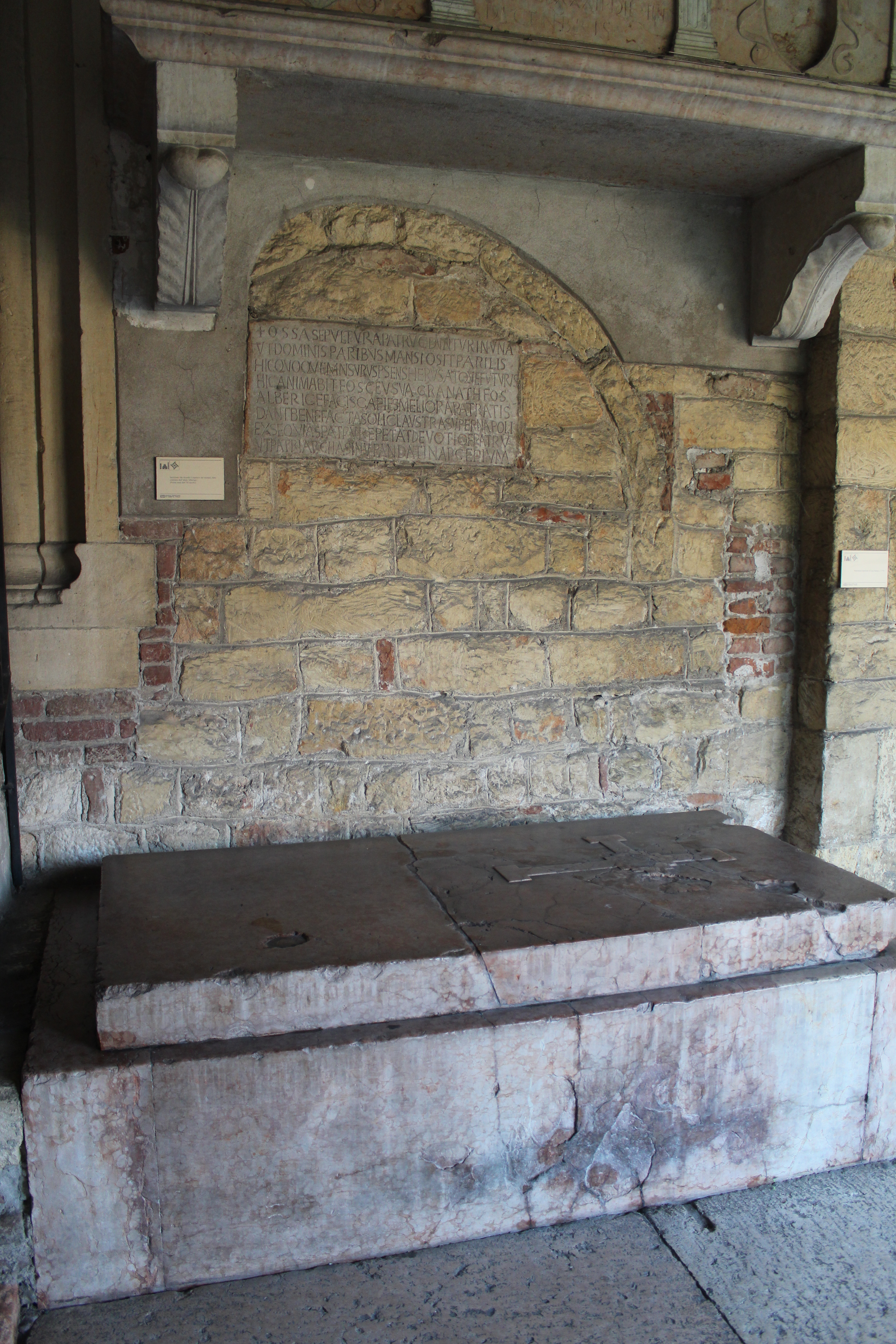
Monks' tomb with the inscription above commemorating it

On the southern side is the aforementioned tomb of the monks of the abbey built in the 11th century by Abbot Alberico; though it is not certain that the present one is the original one, it is a red marble tomb enclosed by a thick slab on which there is a large cross in relief, and above it an inscription remembers it. (Note: The inscription on the tombstone reads as follows: "OSSA SEPULTURA PATRUM CONDUNTUR IN UNA, UT DOMINIS PARIBUS MANSIO SIT PARILIS: HIC QUOQUE MANSURUS PRESENS HERUS ATQUE FUTURUS HIC ANIMABIT EOS, CEU SUA GRANA, THEOS. ALBERICE FACIS, CAPIES MELIORA PATRATIS, DANT BENE FACTA SOLI, CLAUSTRA SUPERNA POLI EXSEQUIAS PATRUM REPETAT DEVOTIO FRATRUM, UT PATRIARCHA SINUM PANDAT IN ARCE PIUM". In Simeoni (1909, p. 12).) Next to it opens the door leading to the upper church, provided with a lunette with a fresco from the early 14th century depicting a Madonna with two angels.

On the wall of the eastern side is a vast fresco by the Veronese painter Jacopo Ligozzi in which he depicted the Last Judgment and the Allegory. On the same wall opens a door that allows access, by descending a few steps, to the so-called sacellum of St. Benedict, above which there is a lunette frescoed in the late 14th century with a Madonna with two bishop saints.

=== Sacellum of St. Benedict ===
Along the southern flank of the cloister is a door through which one can enter the so-called sacellum (or oratory) of St. Benedict. It is a small, square room divided into three small naves of equal size, covered by nine rib vaults supported by four supports largely made through reused materials dating from very different eras. Among these, noteworthy are a sixth-century pulvino in Byzantine style and a Roman cippus placed in a wall pillar. The walls have a 14th-century yellow, red, and green square decoration, while there is a fragment of a fresco on the north wall that is not easily readable.

Several epochs have been proposed to date the construction of said sacellum, among the most reliable being the one formulated by art historian Wart Arslan, who considers it to be a work of the 12th century, while others, while agreeing on the dating, propose that it was a renovation of an earlier small building that would date as far back as Roman times (4th-5th centuries). Several suppositions have been made about the original function of said room, among them it has been proposed that it could have been the ancient sacristy or chapter house. The name "St. Benedict" comes from the fact that in 1723 a plaque was found whose engraving told how a monk of the abbey had had "hoc opus ecclesie sancti benedicit" built at his own expense.

== See also ==
- Verona
- Basilica of San Zeno, Verona
- Zeno of Verona

== Bibliography ==
- Arslan, Edoardo (1939). L'architettura romanica veronese. Verona: La Tipografica veronese.
- Benini, Gianfranco (1988). Le chiese di Verona: guida storico-artistica. Arte e natura libri.
- Biancolini, Giovanni Battista (1749). Notizie storiche delle chiese di Verona. Verona.
- Borelli, Giorgio, ed. (1980). Chiese e monasteri di Verona. Verona: Banca Popolare di Verona.
- Castagnetti, Andrea (1972). "I possessi del monastero di S. Zeno di Verona a Bardolino". Studi medievali. serie III, vol. XIII: 95–159.
- Borelli, Giorgio, ed. (1983). Un lago, una civiltà: il Garda. Vol. 1. Verona: Banca Popolare di Verona. pp. 31–114.
- Castagnetti, Andrea (1991). Le città della Marca Veronese. Verona: Libreria Universitaria Editrice.
- Cozzi, Enrica (1992). Mauro Lucco (ed.). La pittura nel Veneto. Il Trecento. Milano: Electa.
- Da Lisca, Alessandro (1941). La basilica di San Zenone in Verona. Verona: Scuola Tipogafica Don Bosco.
- da Persico, Giovanni Battista (1838). Verona e la sua Provincia, nuovamente descritte. Verona: presso Francesco Pollidi.
- Fainelli, Vittorio, ed. (1940). Codice diplomatico veronese. Vol. I. Venezia: Deputazione di Storia Patria per le Venezie.
- Fainelli, Vittorio, ed. (1963). Codice diplomatico veronese. Vol. II. Venezia: Deputazione di Storia Patria per le Venezie.
- Lorenzoni, Giovanni; Valenzano, Giovanna (2000). Il Duomo di Modena e la Basilica di San Zeno. Verona: Banca Popolare di Verona.
- Parolotto, Alessia (2002). La biblioteca del monastero di San Zeno in Verona (1318-1770). Verona: Della Scala.
- Patuzzo, Mario (2010). San Zeno: gioiello d'arte romanica. Vago di Lavagno: Editrice La Grafica.
- Puppi, Loredana Olivato (1981). San Zeno. Verona: Banca Popolare di Verona.
- Simeoni, Luigi (1959). Studi su Verona nel medioevo. Vol. I. Verona.
- Simeoni, Luigi (1909). S. Zeno di Verona. Studi con nuovi documenti. Verona: Baroni.
- Solinas, Giovanni (1981). Storia di Verona. Verona: Centro Rinascita.
- Varanini, Gian Maria (2005a). "Ricerche di storia gardesana. Il territorio fra l'Adige, il Baldo e il Garda nei secoli IX e X". Medioevo. Studi e documenti. 1. Verona: Libreria Universitaria: 163–176.
- Varanini, Gian Maria (2005b). "Ricerche di storia gardesana. Insediamento, organizzazione del territorio, società nell'alto Garda veronese: Brenzone e Campo di Brenzone (secoli XII-XV)". Medioevo. Studi e documenti. 1. Verona: Libreria Universitaria: 177–226.
- Varanini, Gian Maria (1997). "Crisi della grande proprietà monastica nel basso medioevo: l'esempio della Gardesana veronese". Il priorato di San Colombano di Bardolino e la presenza monastica nella Gardesana Orientale, Atti del Convegno, Bardolino 26-27 ottobre 1996. Torri del Benaco: Centro Studi per il Territorio Benacense. pp. 39–63.
