= San Nicolò all'Arena, Verona =

San Nicolò all'Arena
- Chiesa di San Nicolò all'Arena
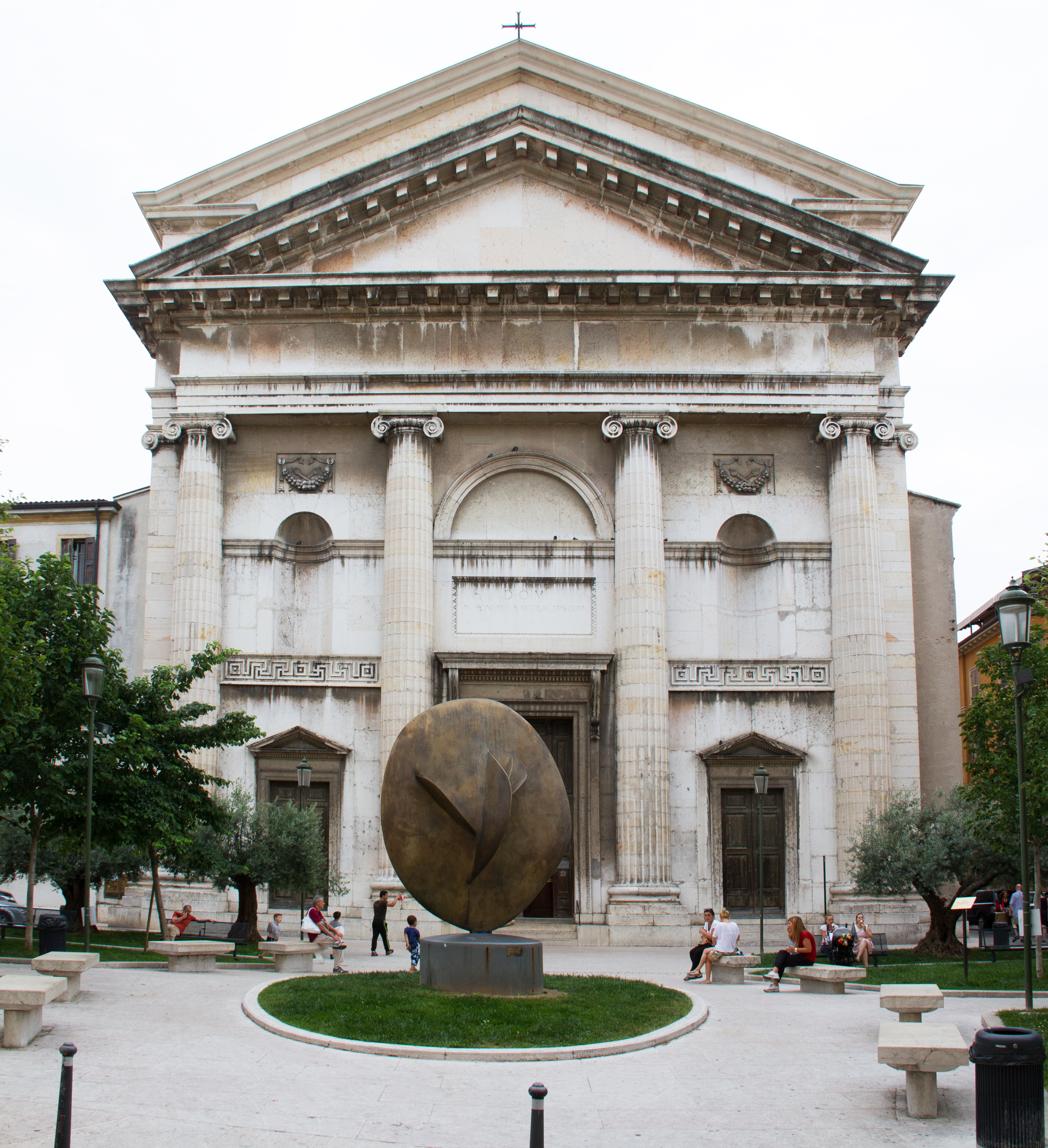
- Façade of the church in 2014
- San Nicolò all'Arena
- 45°26′23″N 10°59′44″E
- Location: Verona
- Country: Italy
- Denomination: Roman Catholic
- Religious order: Theatines (1598–1806)

History
- Status: Parish church
- Founded: 12th century or earlier (first church)
- Dedication: Saint Nicholas
- Consecrated: 1697

Architecture
- Functional status: Active
- Architect: Lellio Pellesina
- Style: Romanesque (original church); Baroque and neoclassical (present church)
- Years built: 1627–1683; 1951–1953 (façade)

Specifications
- Materials: Brick and stone

Administration
- Diocese: Verona

San Nicolò all'Arena is a Roman Catholic parish church in the historic centre of Verona, Italy dedicated to Saint Nicholas. It is located close to the Arena, a well-preserved 1st century AD Roman amphitheatre. The present Baroque building was constructed between 1627 and 1683 on the site of an earlier Romanesque church which had existed since the 12th century or earlier. The church's façade remained incomplete until the neoclassical façade of the church of San Sebastiano was relocated to San Nicolò in the 1950s, after the former church was destroyed during World War II.

== History ==
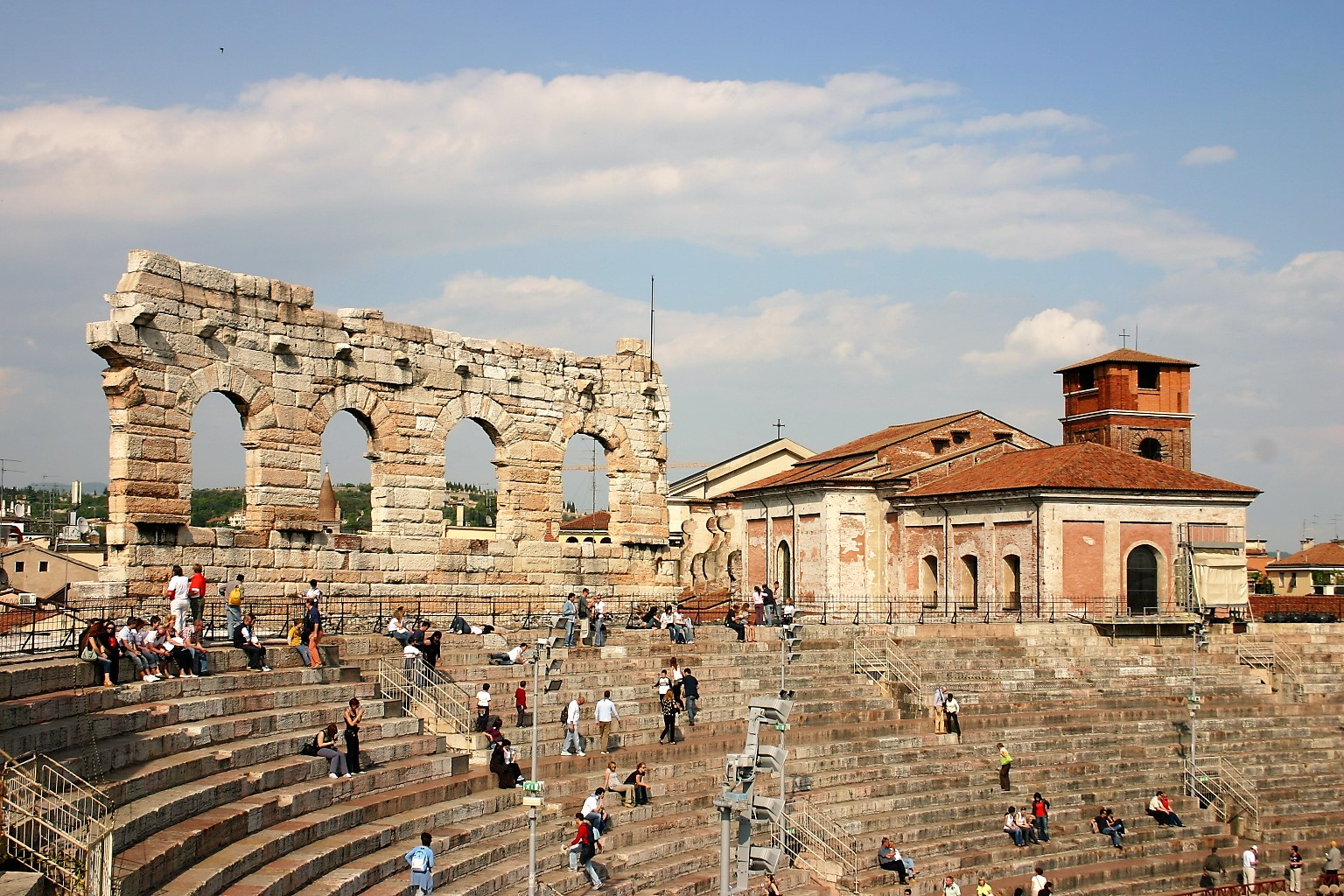
The rear of the church as viewed from inside the Verona Arena

The earliest known reference to San Nicolò all'Arena dates back to the 12th century, when a Romanesque church known as San Nicholai de Buchadarena stood on its site. The building got its name from its proximity to the Roman Arena, and it is believed to have been a parish church by 1336. Some relics which included the remains of martyrs were discovered inside the building in 1519.

The church and the surrounding area were acquired by the Theatines in 1598, who made plans to reconstruct the church and build a monastery. It ceased to be a parish church in 1603. Reconstruction began on 21 March 1627 to designs of the architect Lellio Pellesina and the Romanesque church was demolished in 1630, but during that year work was interrupted due to a plague outbreak. After the plague ended, a crypt dedicated to Christ the Redeemer was built within the church to commemorate deliverance from the outbreak. Construction of the crypt began on 15 March 1631 and it was completed in 1640. The church itself was finished in 1683, although the planned dome was never built and the stone cladding on the façade was never installed. It was consecrated by the bishop Pietro Leoni in 1697.

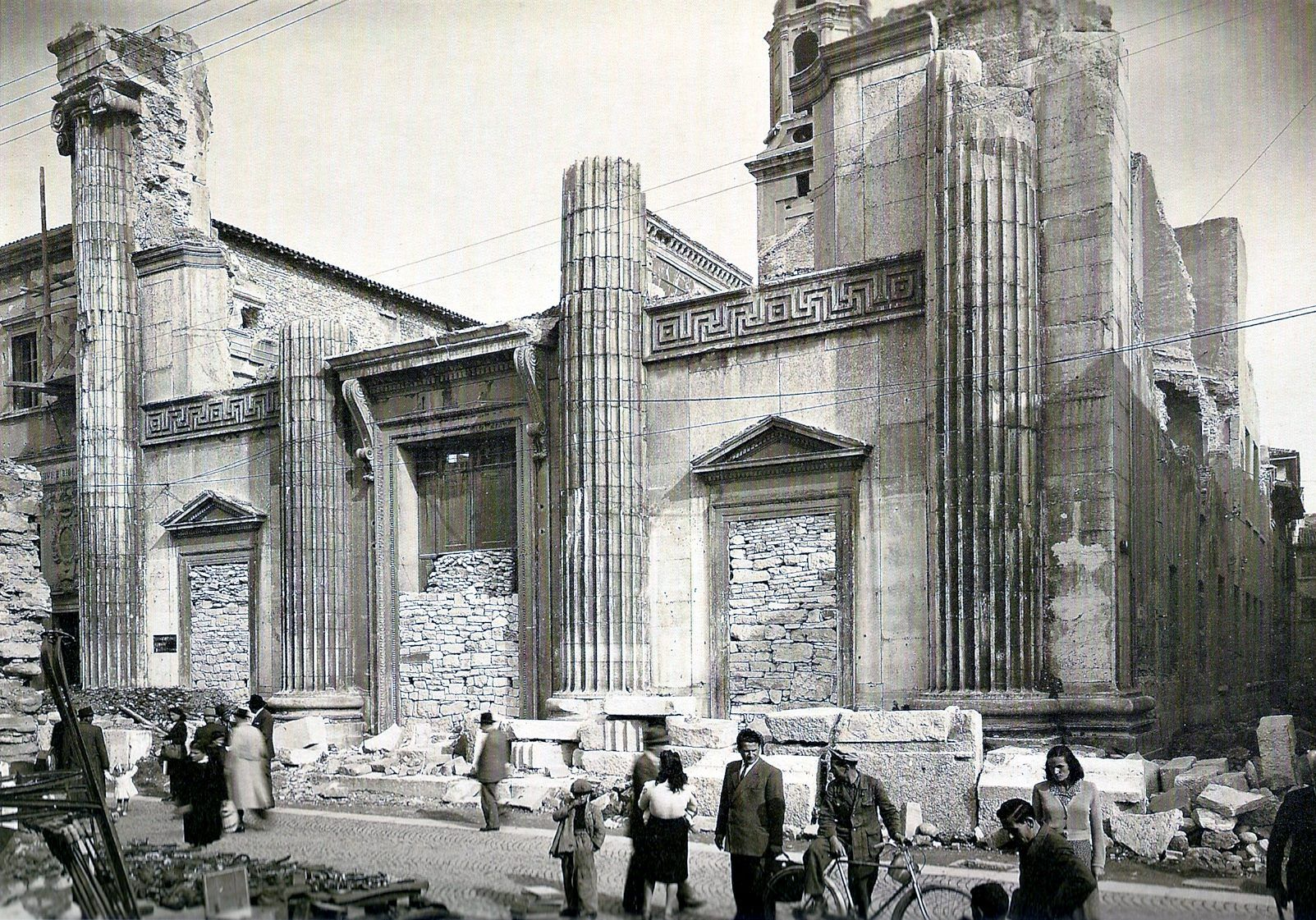
Ruins of the church of San Sebastiano in 1946, before its façade was relocated to San Nicolò all'Arena

In 1806, during Napoleonic rule, the Theatines were evicted from the church. It became a parish church once again in 1810. The façade remained incomplete until the mid-20th century, when the façade of the church of San Sebastiano was relocated to San Nicolò all'Arena. San Sebastiano had been bombed during World War II, and its façade (which had been completed in 1830 by the architect Giuseppe Barbieri) was dismantled and rebuilt at the new location between 1951 and 1953. During the relocation, some changes had to be made to the façade to accommodate for the larger dimensions of San Nicolò all'Arena, including the construction of a concrete tympanum.

Restoration work in the nave and transept were carried out in 1998 and 1999 under the direction of the architect Oreste Valdinoci. In 2001, a ramp was added to the side entrance by the architect Paola Bogoni in order to improve accessibility. Restoration of the internal flooring was carried out between 2001 and 2002 by the architect Massimiliano Valdinoci, and the church's interior and exterior were consolidated and restored between 2012 and 2015 by the architect Giovanni Castiglioni.

== Architecture ==
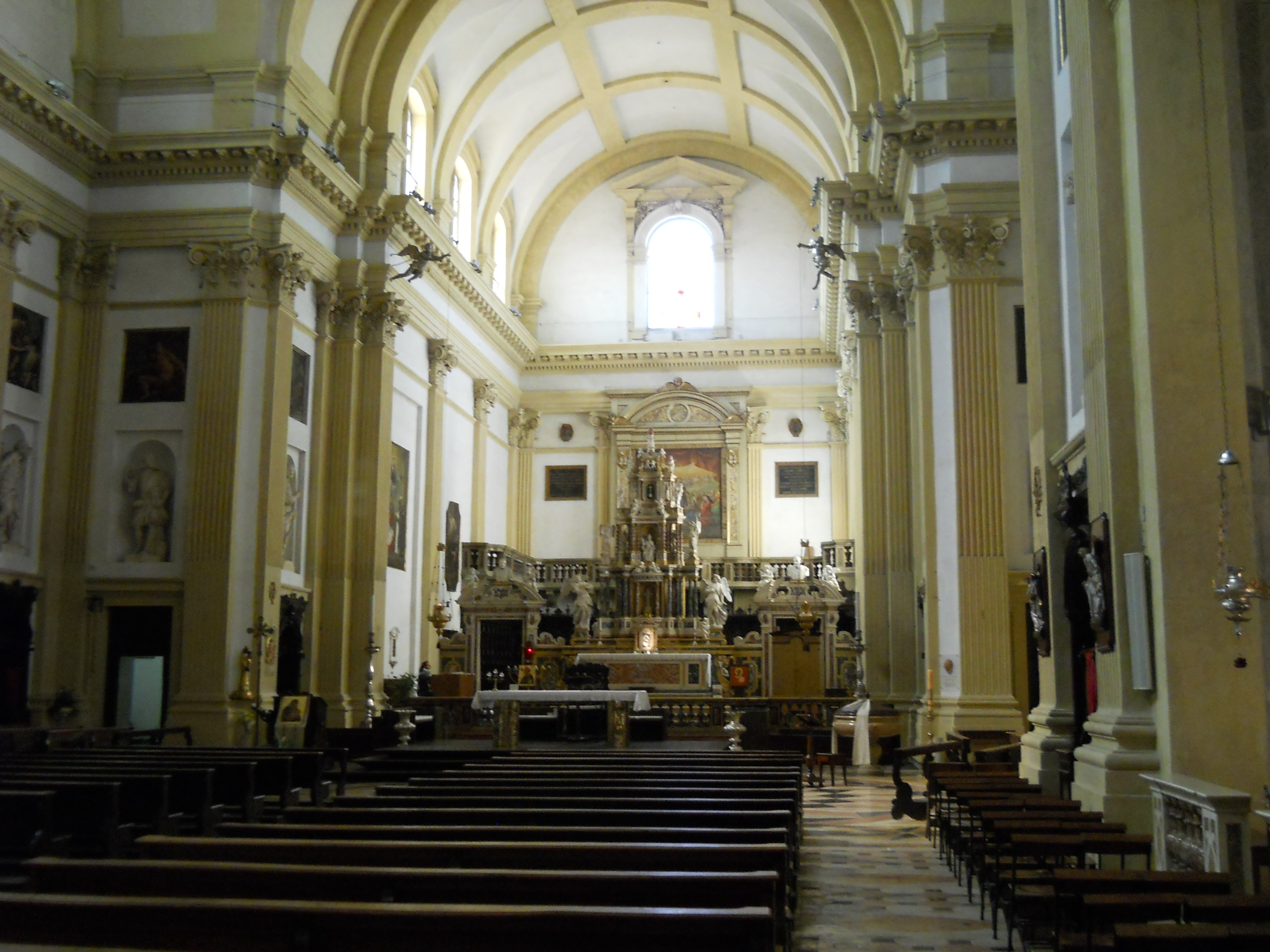
The church's interior with the deep presbytery

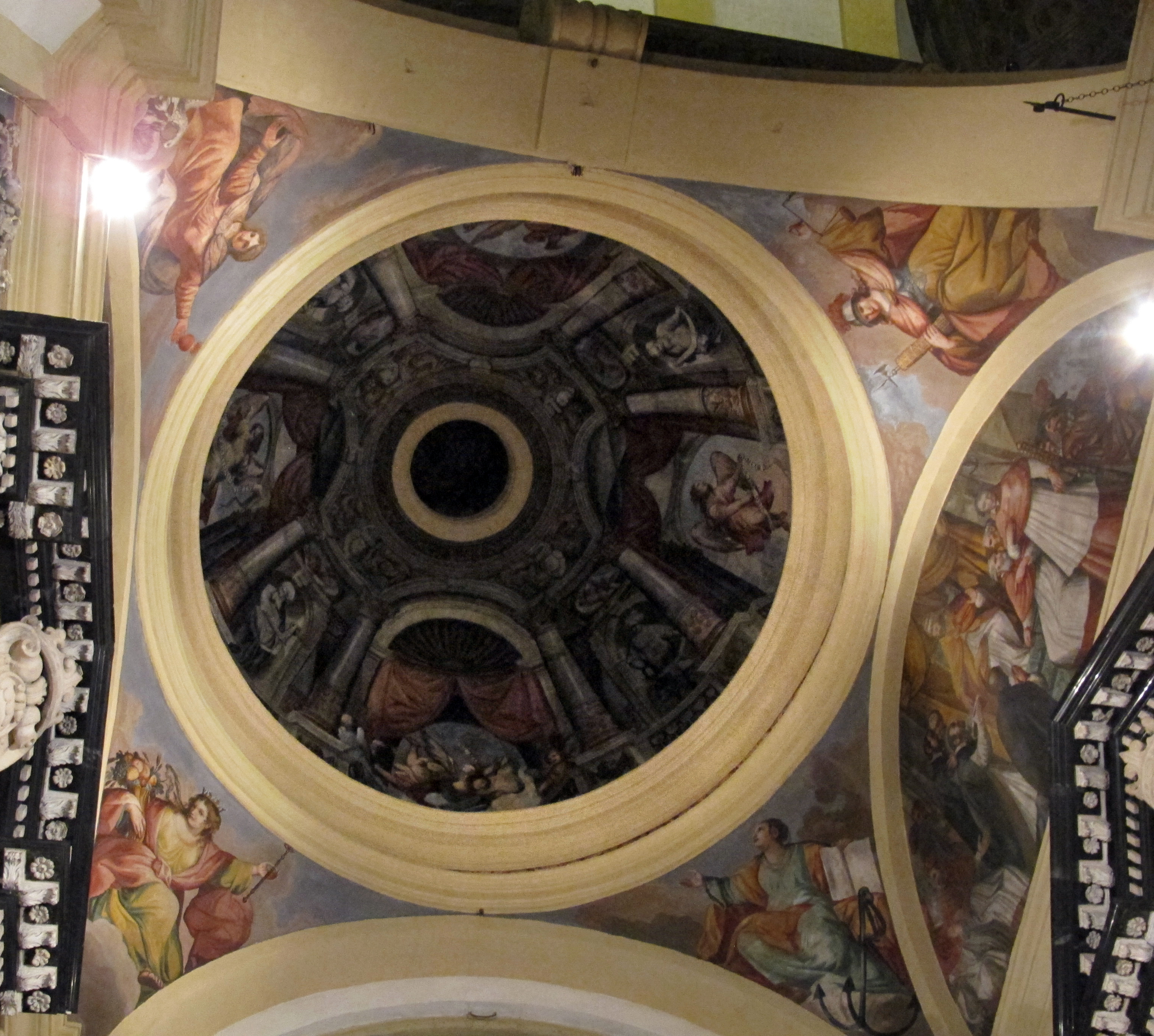
The trompe-l'œil painting of the dome

The present church is built in the Baroque style, while the relocated façade is neoclassical. The latter has four fluted Ionic columns of a giant order which support a triangular tympanum. The main doorway is located in the centre, and this is surmounted by an inscription which reads D.O.M. IN HONOREM S. NICOLAI EPISCOPI. There are two smaller portals which are surmounted by pediments, and above them there are empty niches and decorations of festoons.

The church is built out of brick and stone. It has a cruciform plan with a single nave and side chapels, a short transept and a deep presbytery. One of the chapels has the painting San Giovanni Battista nel deserto (St John the Baptist in the desert) by Antonio Balestra as its altarpiece.

Below the presbytery there is the crypt which has three naves with barrel vaulted roofs separated by rows of low arches supported by pillars. The church has a bell tower which is located at the rear of the building near the sacristy. This is low and stocky, and it was never completed since a large bell tower would have had a negative visual impact on the nearby Arena.

A dome was planned for the building but this was never built, and in its place there is a flat ceiling with a trompe-l'œil simulating a dome.
