= Zeno of Verona =

Italian Catholic bishop and saint

Saint Zeno of Verona
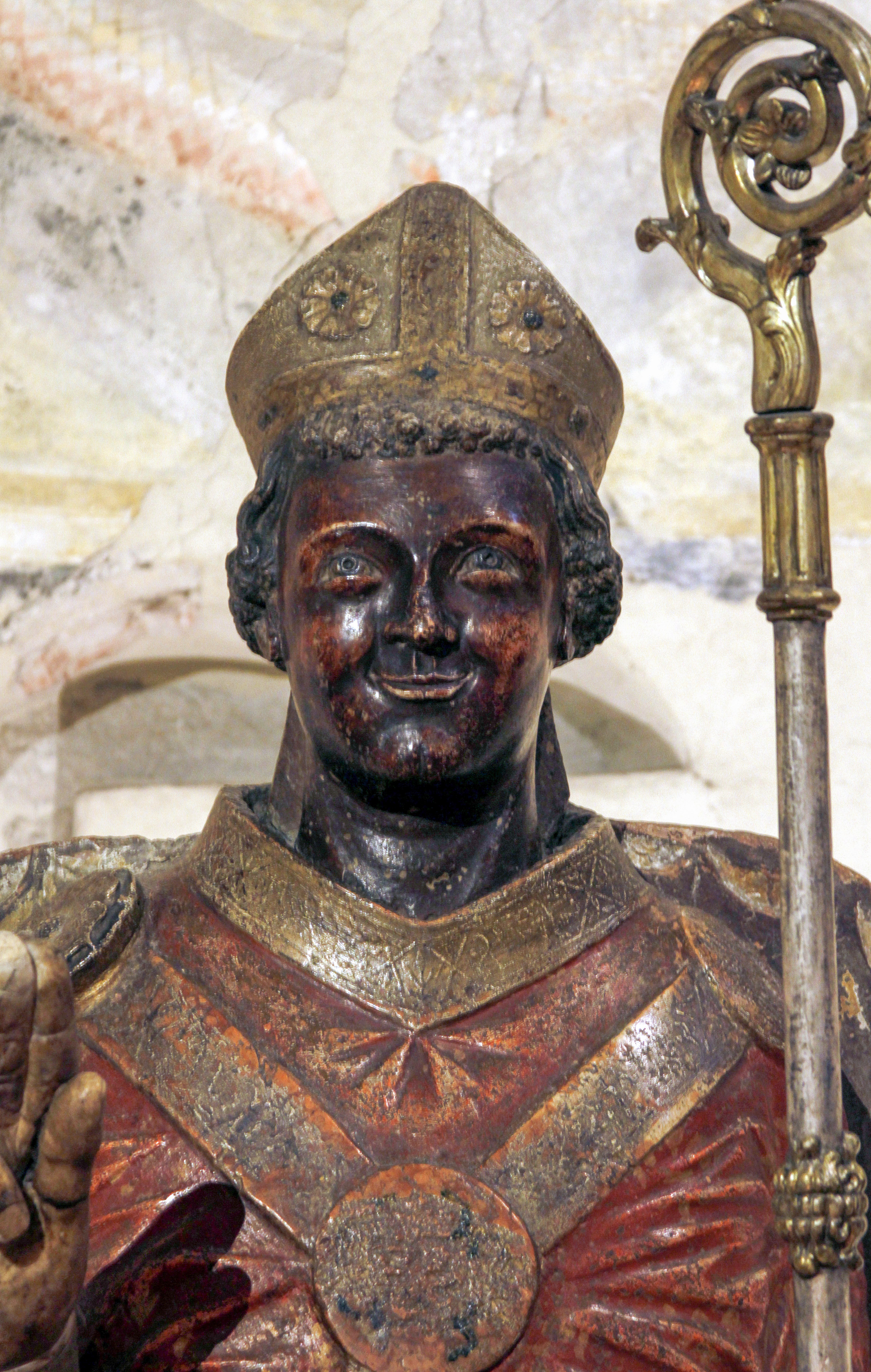
- Statue of Saint Zeno from the Basilica of San Zeno

Bishop, Martyr
- Born: 300; Mauretania
- Died: 12 April 371 (aged 71–72); Verona
- Major shrine: Basilica of San Zeno, Verona
- Feast: 12 April; 21 May (translation of relics)
- Attributes: fish, fishing rod, or a bishop holding a fishing rod, or with a fish hanging from his crozier.
- Patronage: Fishermen, anglers, newborn babies, Verona, Campione d'Italia

Zeno of Verona (Venetian: Xenòn de Verona or Xen de Verona; Italian: Zenone da Verona; about 300 – 371 or 380) was a Mauri Berber Christian figure believed to have either served as Bishop of Verona or died as a martyr. He is venerated as a saint in the Catholic Church and the Orthodox Church.

== Life and historicity ==
In the 7th century, a Veronese notary named Coronatus wrote a biography of Zeno, Sermo de vita Zenonis. He claimed that Zeno was a native of Mauretania who taught children of Africa about the Catholic religion and also helped them with their education.^{[a]} Another claim was that Zeno was a follower of Athanasius, patriarch of Alexandria, and accompanied his master when the latter visited Verona in 340.^{[a]}

The literary style of the more than 90 Sermones attributed to Zeno is also considered evidence of his African origins, since Christian African writers of the time frequently used neologisms and wordplay.^{[a]} Many of the Sermones concern Old Testament exegesis and are said to "have a definite anti-Semitic element in them".^{[b]} This interpretation is not shared by Giuseppe Laiti, expert on San Zeno's work.

Staying in Verona, Zeno entered the monastic life, living as a monk until around 362, when he was elected successor to the See of Verona after the death of Bishop Gricinus.^{[a]}

Zeno had "received a good classical education".^{[b]} As bishop he baptized many people and won converts back from Arianism. He lived a life of poverty. He trained priests to work in the diocese and set up a convent for women. In addition, he reformed how the Agape feast was celebrated and forbade that funeral masses be accompanied by attendees' loud groans and wailing.^{[b]} Zeno's other reforms included instructions concerning adult baptism, which occurred by complete immersion. He instituted the issuing of medals to people newly baptized in the Catholic faith.^{[b]}

Zeno's episcopate lasted for about ten years; the date of his death is sometimes given as 12 April 371.^{[a]}

Zeno is described as a confessor of the faith in early martyrologies.^{[b]} Saint Gregory the Great calls him a martyr in his Dialogues, though Saint Ambrose, a contemporary of Zeno, does not.^{[b]} Ambrose speaks of Zeno's "happy death", although as a confessor, Zeno may have suffered persecution (but not execution) during the reigns of Constantius II and Julian the Apostate.^{[b]} The entry in the modern Roman Martyrology lists his death date as 12 April, but makes no mention of martyrdom.

The first evidence for his existence was found in a letter written by Saint Ambrose to Bishop Syagrius in which Ambrose referred to the holiness of Zeno. Later, Bishop Saint Petronius of Verona (r. 412–429) wrote of Zeno's virtues and also confirmed the existence of a cult dedicated to Saint Zeno.^{[a]}

A poem written between 781 and 810, called the Versus de Verona, an elegy to the city in verse, states that Zeno was the eighth bishop of Verona.^{[a]}

== Veneration ==
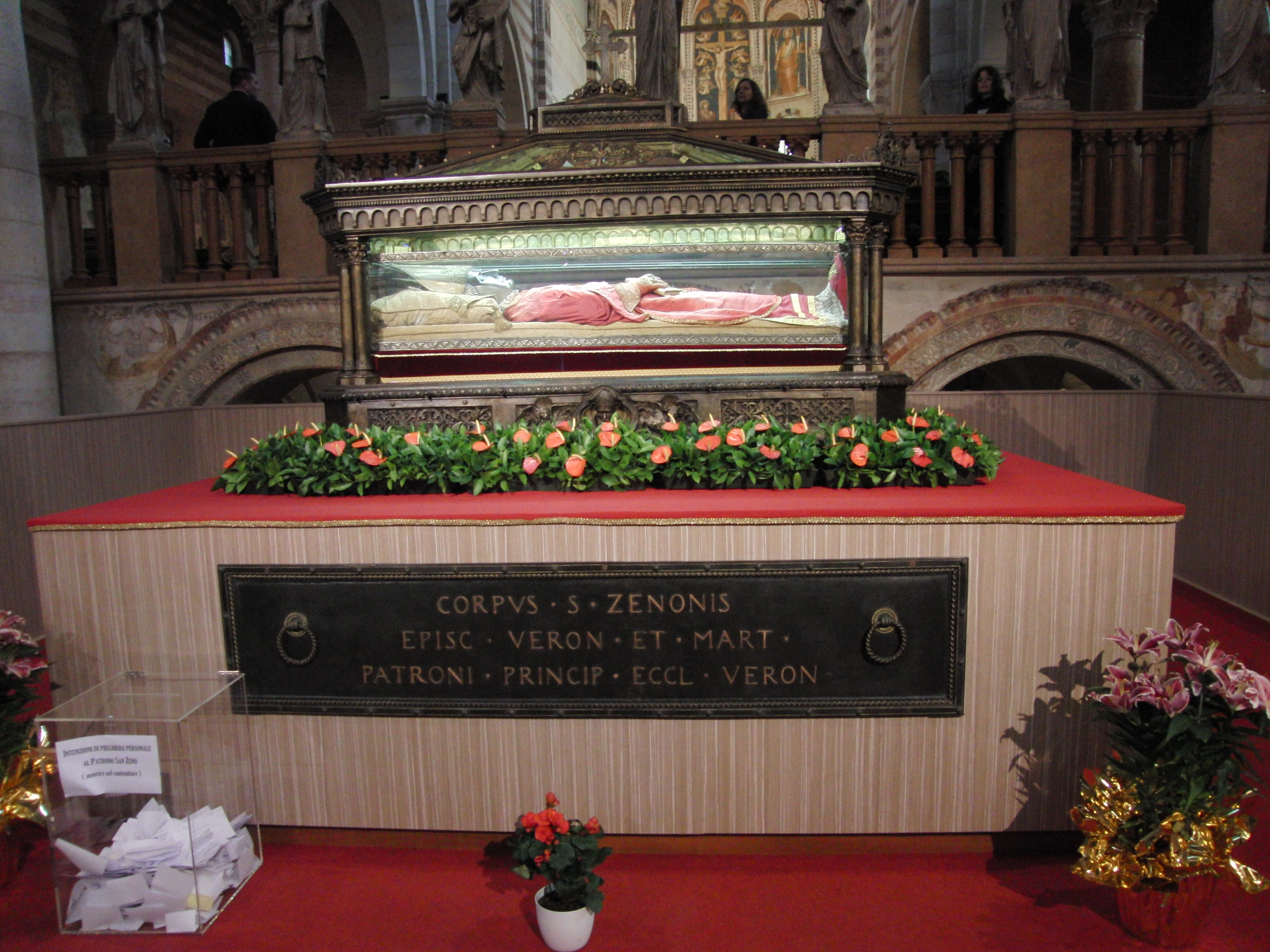
St Zeno's body ready for his feast day procession on 21 May 2012

Zeno's liturgical feast day is celebrated on 12 April, but in the diocese of Verona a celebration is also held on 21 May, to commemorate the translation of his relics on 21 May 807.^{[a]}

Tradition states that Zeno built the first basilica in Verona, probably situated in the area occupied by the present-day cathedral.^{[a]} The church named after him in its present location dates to the early ninth century, when it was endowed by Charlemagne and his son Pepin, King of Italy. It was consecrated on 8 December 806. Two local hermits, Benignus and Carus, were assigned the task of translating Zeno's relics to a new marble crypt.^{[a]} King Pepin was present at the ceremony, as were the Bishops of Cremona and Salzburg, and an immense crowd of townspeople.^{[a]}

The church was damaged at the beginning of the tenth century by Hungarians, though the relics of Zeno remained safe.^{[a]} The basilica was rebuilt, making it larger and stronger. Financial support was provided by Otto I, and it was re-consecrated in 967 at a ceremony presided over by Bishop Ratherius of Verona.^{[a]}

The present church of San Zeno in Verona is for the most part a work of the twelfth, thirteenth, and early fifteenth centuries. It is well known for its bronze doors (c. 1100 – c. 1200) which depict, besides stories from the Bible, images drawn from the stories of the miracles of Saint Zeno including those recorded by the notary Coronato.^{[a]} The church is also known for the facade sculpture signed by Nicholaus and an associate Guglielmus, and the rose window (c. 1200), which is the work of Brioloto.

== Legends and iconography ==
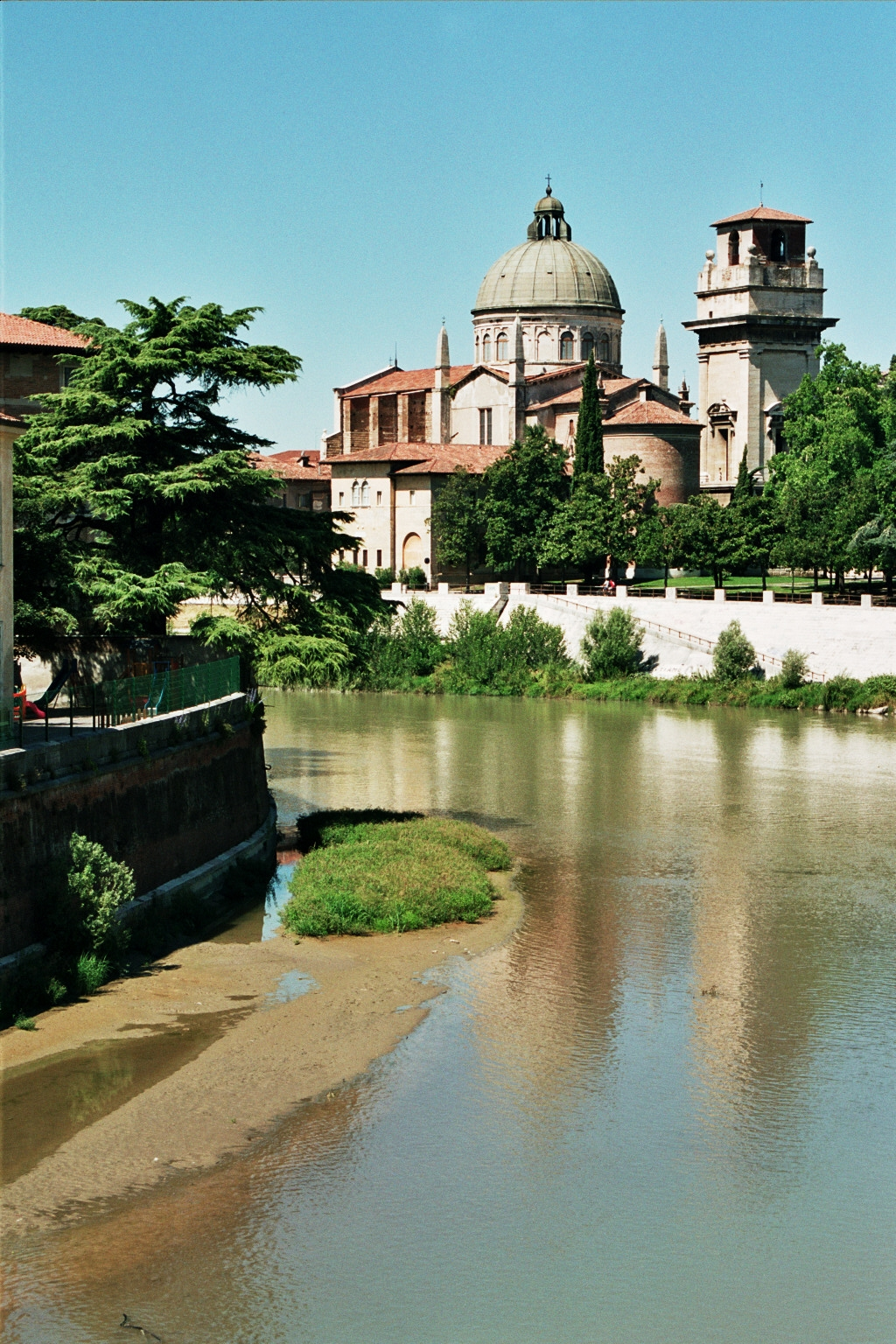
The Adige flowing through Verona

Zeno is the patron saint of fishermen and anglers, the city of Verona, newborn babies, and children learning to speak and walk. Some 30 churches or chapels have been dedicated to him, including Pistoia Cathedral.

According to legend, he was stolen at birth and briefly replaced by a demonic changeling. One story relates that Saint Zeno, fishing on the banks of the Adige, which he did in order to feed himself, saw a peasant crossing the river in a horse and cart. The horses became strangely skittish. Zeno, believing this behavior to be the work of the devil, made the sign of the cross, and the horses calmed down.^{[a]} Zeno was often said to combat the devil, and is sometimes depicted treading on a demon. Another story relates that he exorcised a demon from the body of the daughter of the Emperor Gallienus, although Zeno probably did not live during the reign of Gallienus. The story relates that the grateful Gallienus allowed Zeno and other Christians freedom of worship in the empire.^{[a]}

Saint Gregory the Great, at the end of the 6th century, related a miracle associated with the divine intercession of Zeno.^{[a]} In 588, the Adige flooded its banks, inundating Verona. The floodwater reached the church dedicated to Saint Zeno, but miraculously did not enter it, even though the door was wide open. The church was then donated to Theodelinda, an alleged eyewitness to the miracle and wife of king Authari.^{[a]}

Zeno is most often represented with fishing-related items such as a fish or fishing rod, or as a bishop holding a fishing rod, or with a fish hanging from his crozier. "Local tradition says the bishop was fond of fishing in the nearby river Adige", writes Alban Butler, "but it is more likely that originally it was a symbol of his success in bringing people to baptism."^{[b]}

== Gallery ==
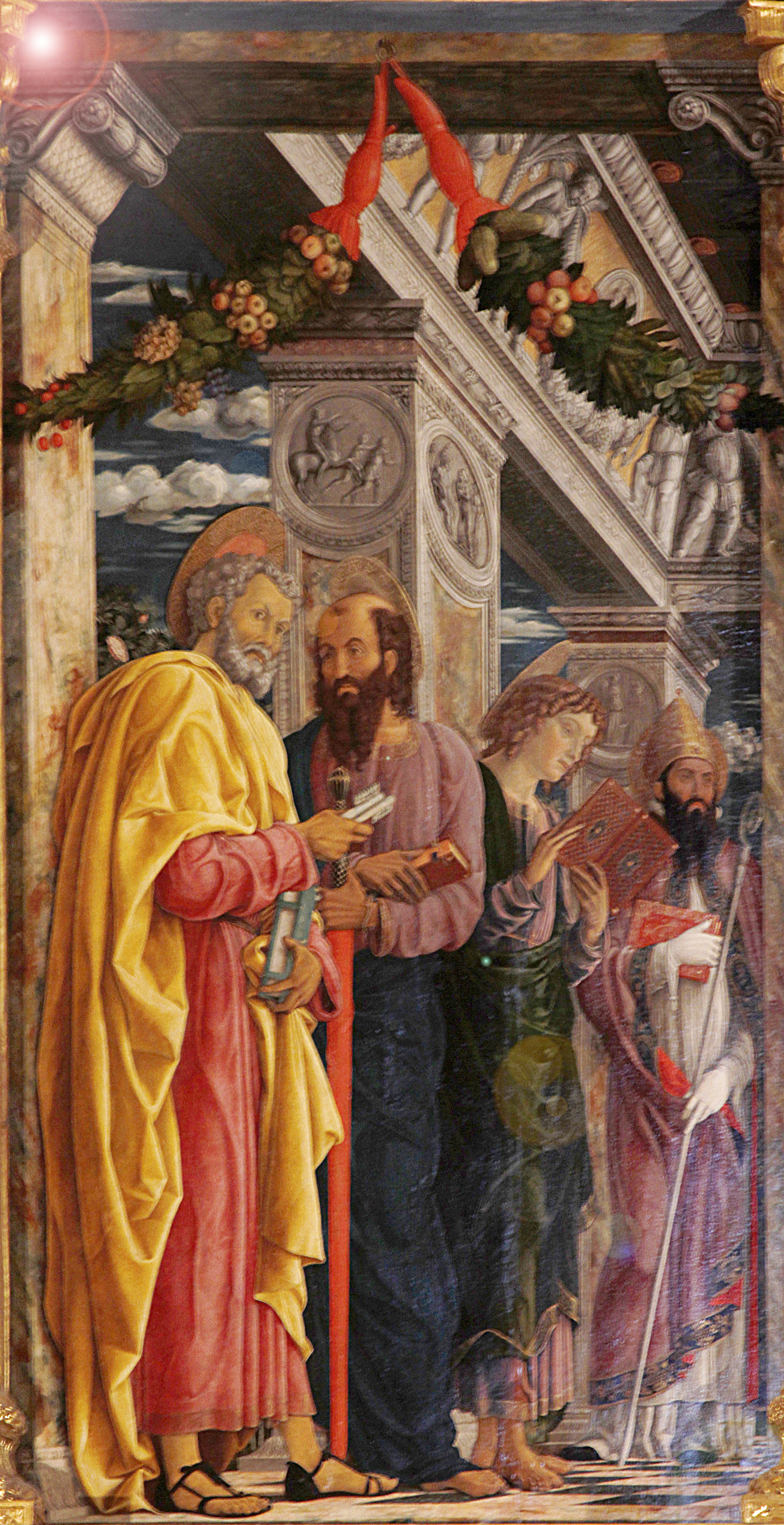
San Zeno Altarpiece. Zeno is on the far right

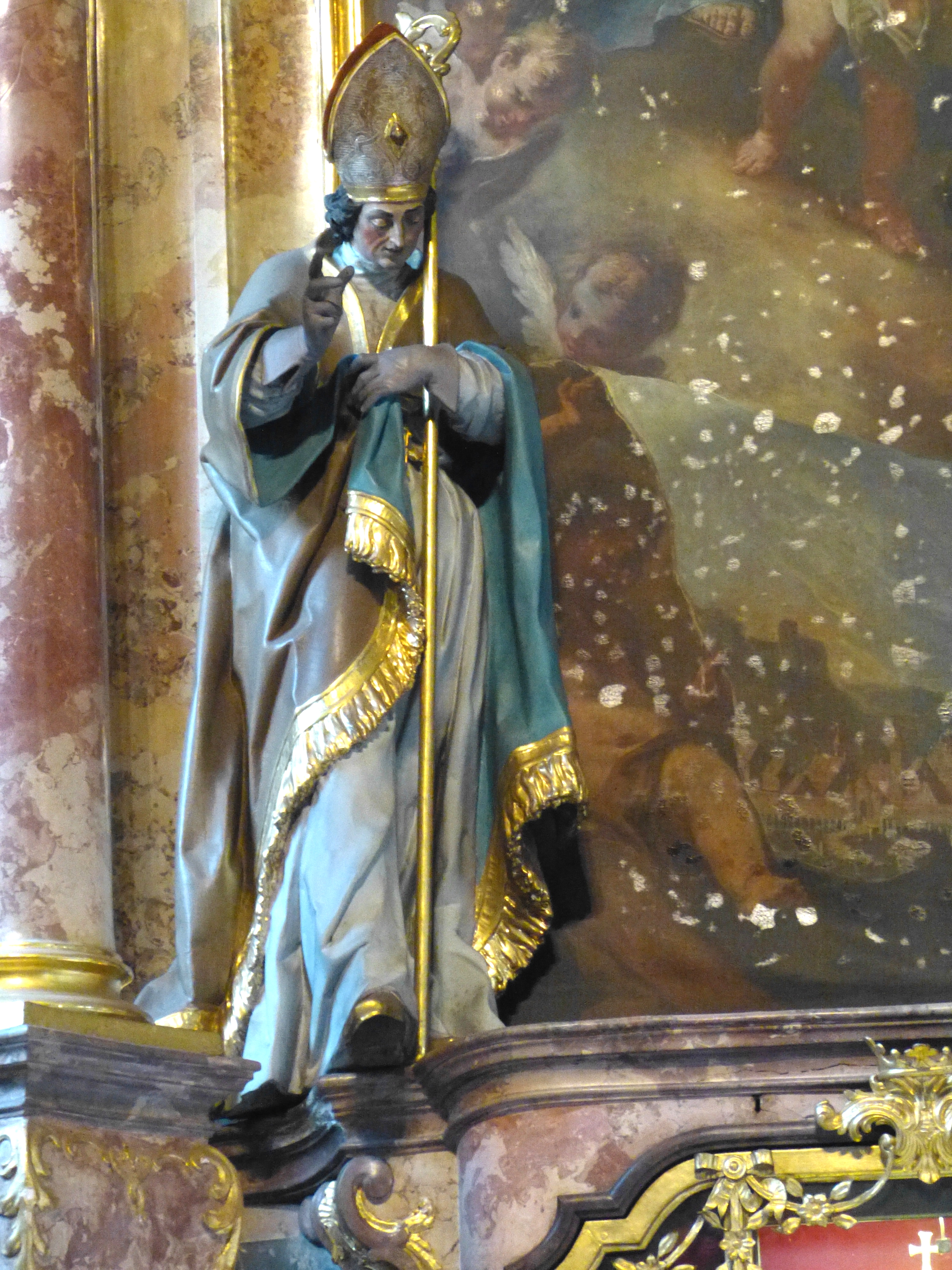
Statue of Zeno at the Radolfzell Minster

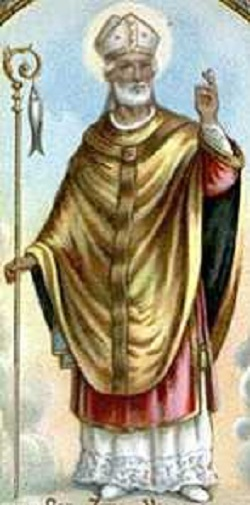
Zenon with a fish on his crozier

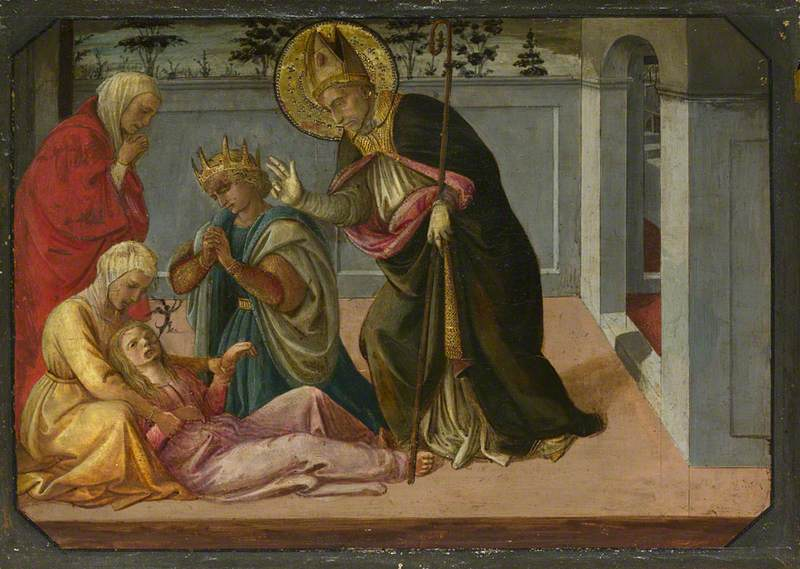
Zeno exorcising the daughter of the Emperor Gallienus

== See also ==
- Abbey of San Zeno, Verona
