= Waterleaf (architecture) =

Sculptural motif

In architecture, a waterleaf is a distinctive sculptural motif used on the capitals of columns and pilasters in European buildings during the late twelfth century. It is a highly simplified plant motif, characteristic of the "late Norman" style of Romanesque architecture.

A waterleaf capital is formed of broad, smooth leaf-shapes (typically four in number), unribbed except for a central fold, which curve upward and outward before curling over at the tips where they meet the abacus (the flat slab at the top of the column, normally square but sometimes octagonal). The curled tip of the waterleaf may be small and neat or large and bulbous; it usually curves inward towards the abacus, but may occasionally turn outwards (both forms can sometimes be seen in adjacent capitals of the same period, as for example at Geddington, Northamptonshire, UK.).

== Gallery ==
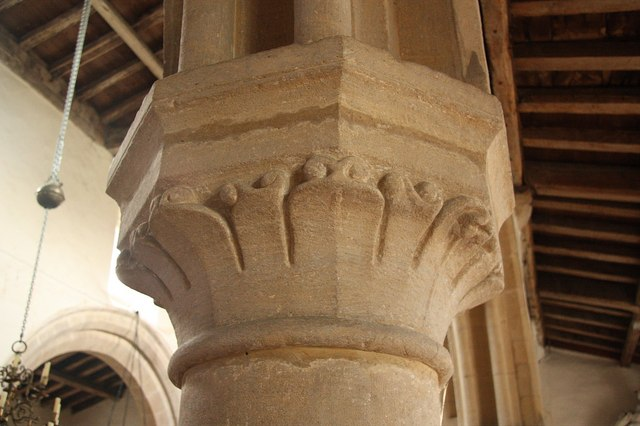
English Romanesque waterleaf capital

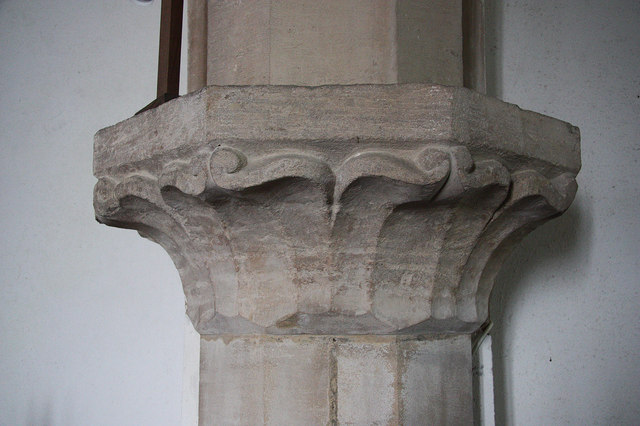
English Romanesque waterleaf capital

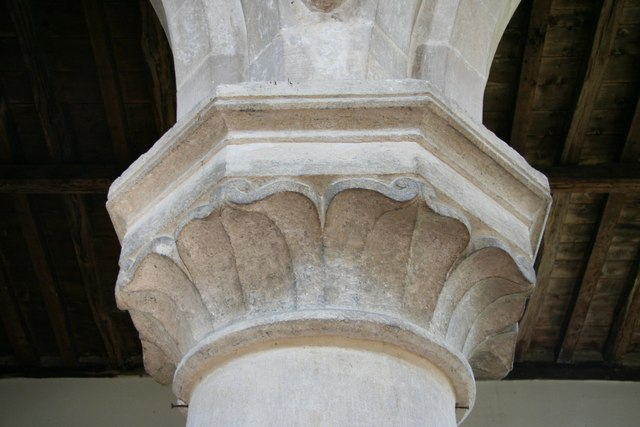
Early English capital in the Church of St.John the Evangelist, Ryhall

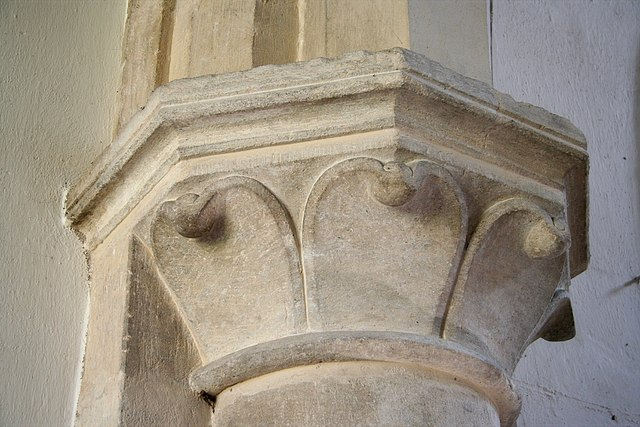
A variation on waterleaf on a 13th century respond capital at Ryhall

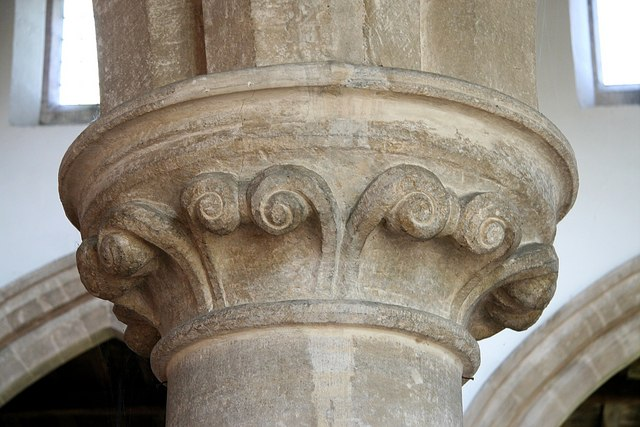
Crocketed waterleaf capital at Ryhall

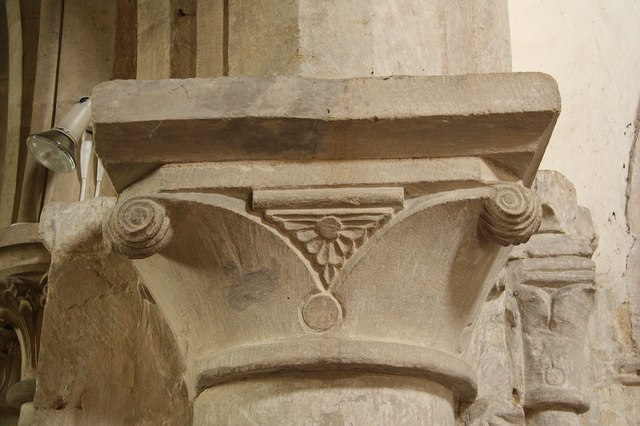
English Romanesque waterleaf capital

Capital of c.1170 in the tower arch (south side), St Giles' Church, Oxford

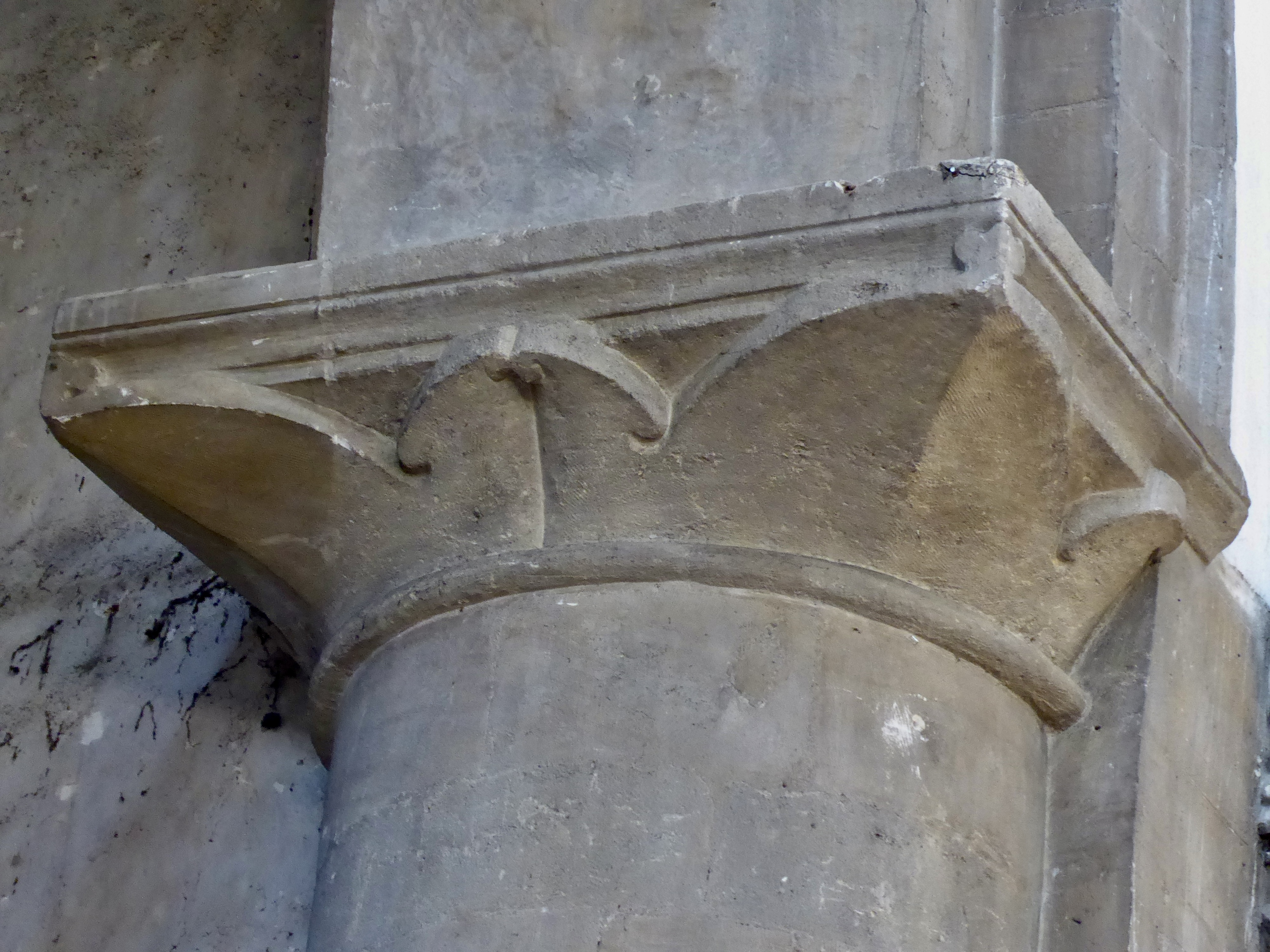
Capital of c.1170 in the tower arch (north side), St Giles' Church, Oxford

== See also ==
- Abacus (architecture)
- Pulvino
- Rais-de-cœur may incorporate waterleaves.
- Stiff-leaf
