= Boutel =

Boutel may refer to:

- Bowtell
- Mrs. Boutel, actress
