= Pulvino =

Architectural element

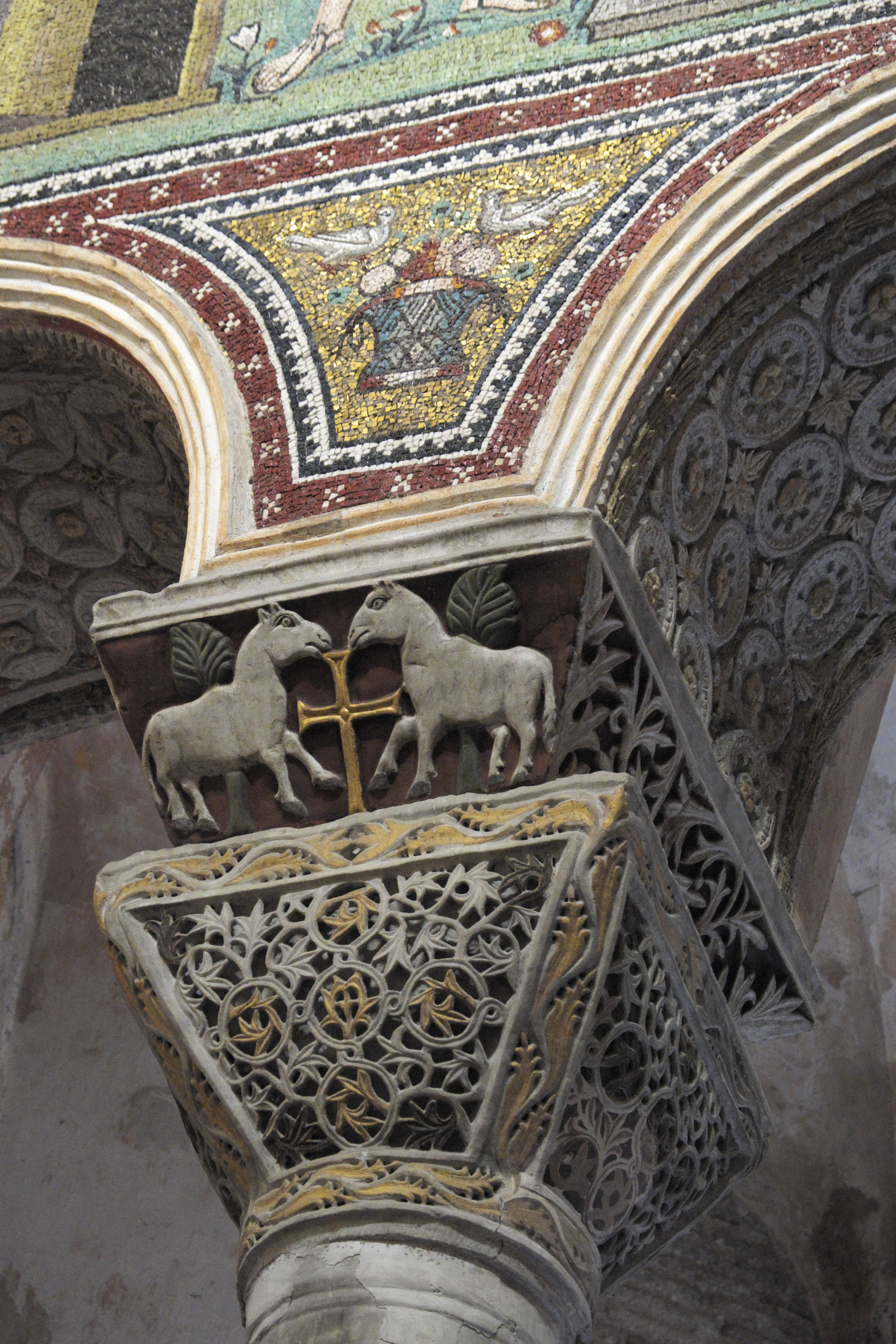
Pulvino in the Basilica of San Vitale

A pulvino (or impost block) is an architectural structural element (dosseret) having the shape of an inverted pyramid cushion, which is placed between the column capital and the arch base.

== Overview ==
Usually decorated with fretwork or relief ornamental motifs, the pulvino reaches its maximum expression in the Byzantine architecture; some examples can be found in the early Christian architecture of Ravenna. Its particular convex shape gives the pulvino the structural function of concentrating the tensions generated by the loads above it and passing the tensions on the column located below the capital. An example can be seen in the church of San Lorenzo in Florence designed by Filippo Brunelleschi around 1420. There he resorted to additional segments of entablature improperly defined as "Brunelleschian nut". The pulvino in this case created a balanced entablature, on which the round arches are set.

== Modern engineering ==
By analogy with the static function of the pulvino on a column, it is also attributed to certain structural elements that have the function of distributing a load from a superimposed structure with higher mechanical resistance characteristics, to a lower structure with lower specific resistance and, therefore, dimensioned in such a way as to reduce the unitary stresses to admissible values.

In contemporary engineering, the pulvino is used as a structural element to distribute the load between an overlying part with less mechanical resistance and an underlying part with higher resistance. For example, it is used in railways to transfer the load of rails onto sleepers. Generally, it is made of cast iron.

== Gallery ==
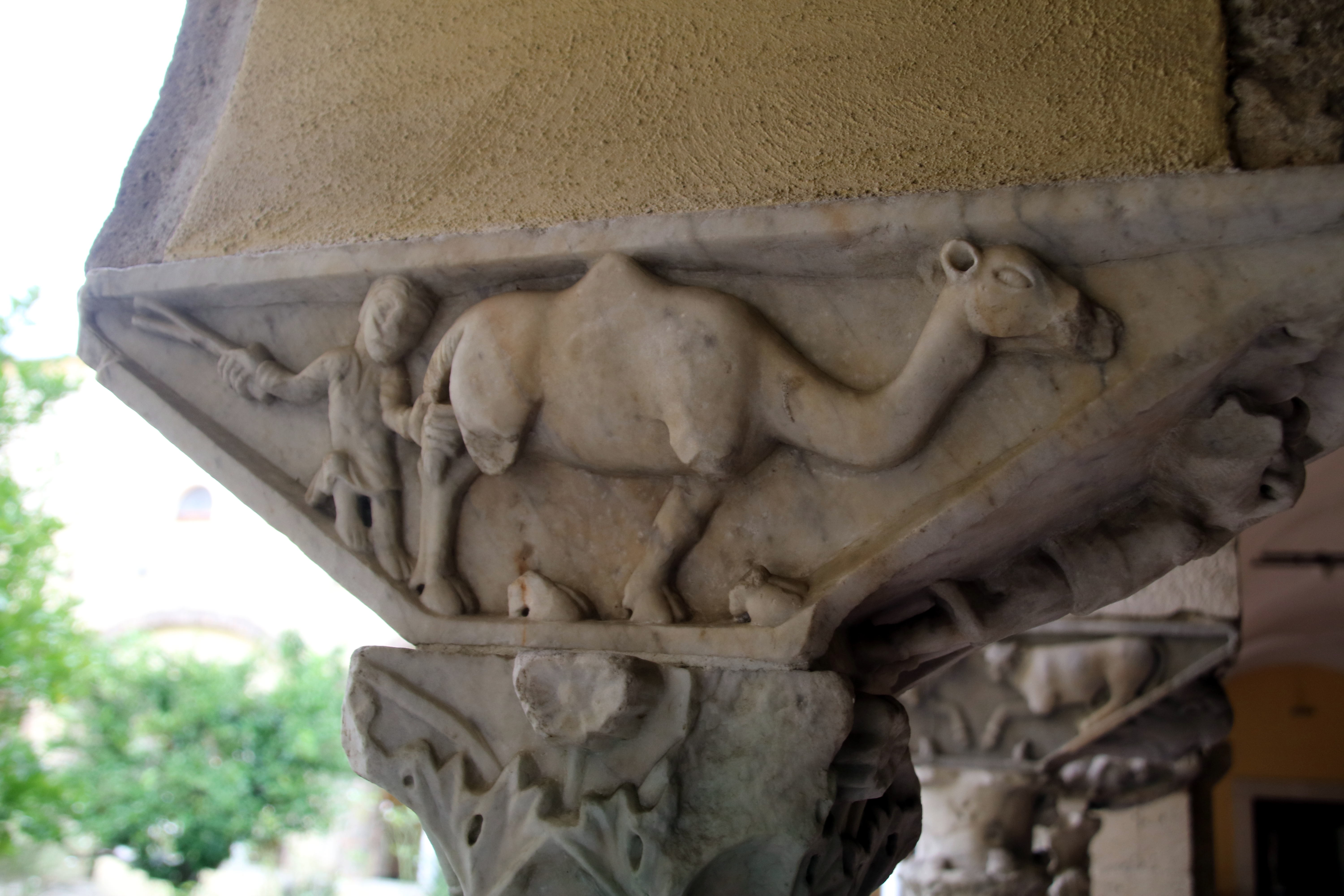
Santa Sofia, Benevento

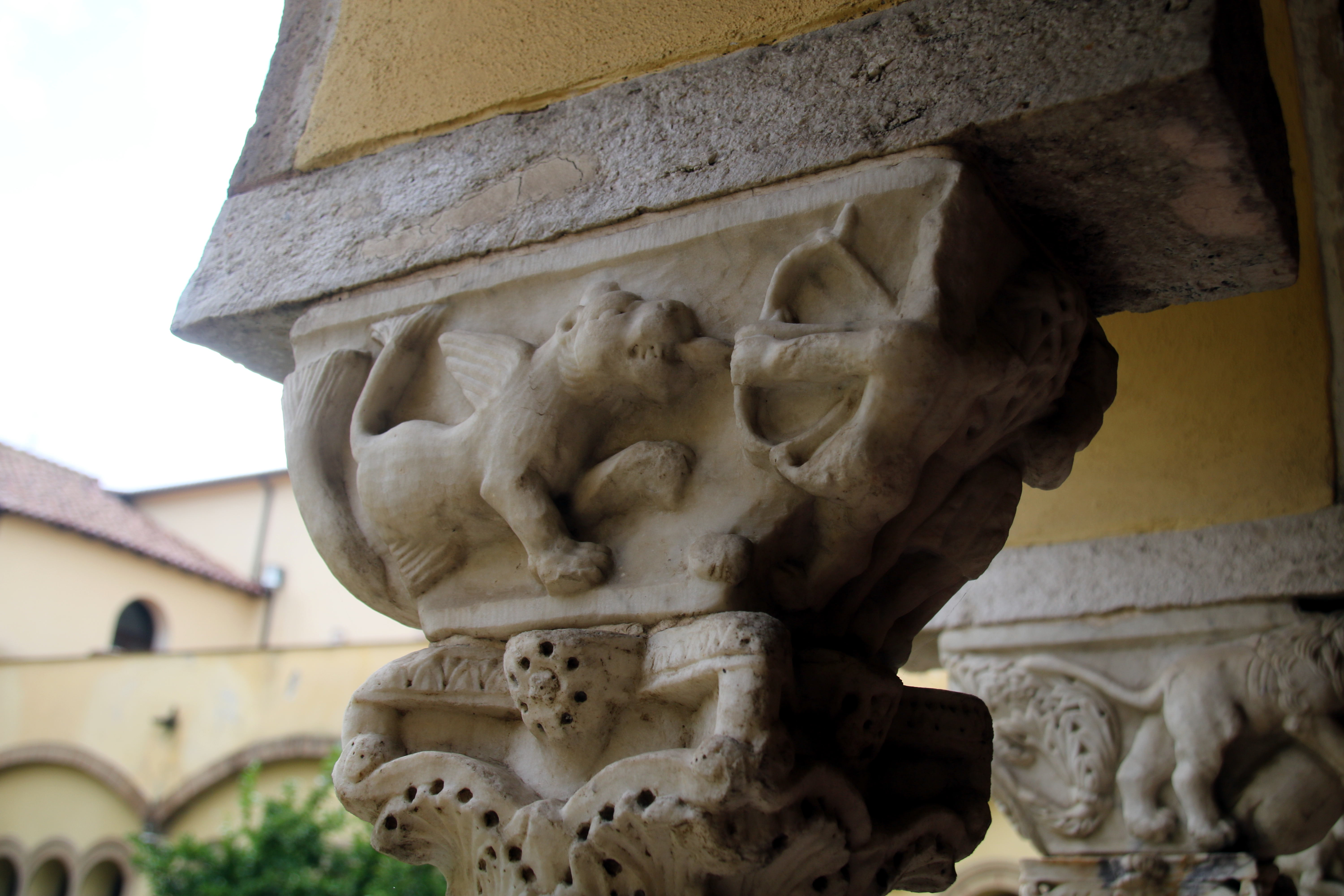
Santa Sofia, Benevento

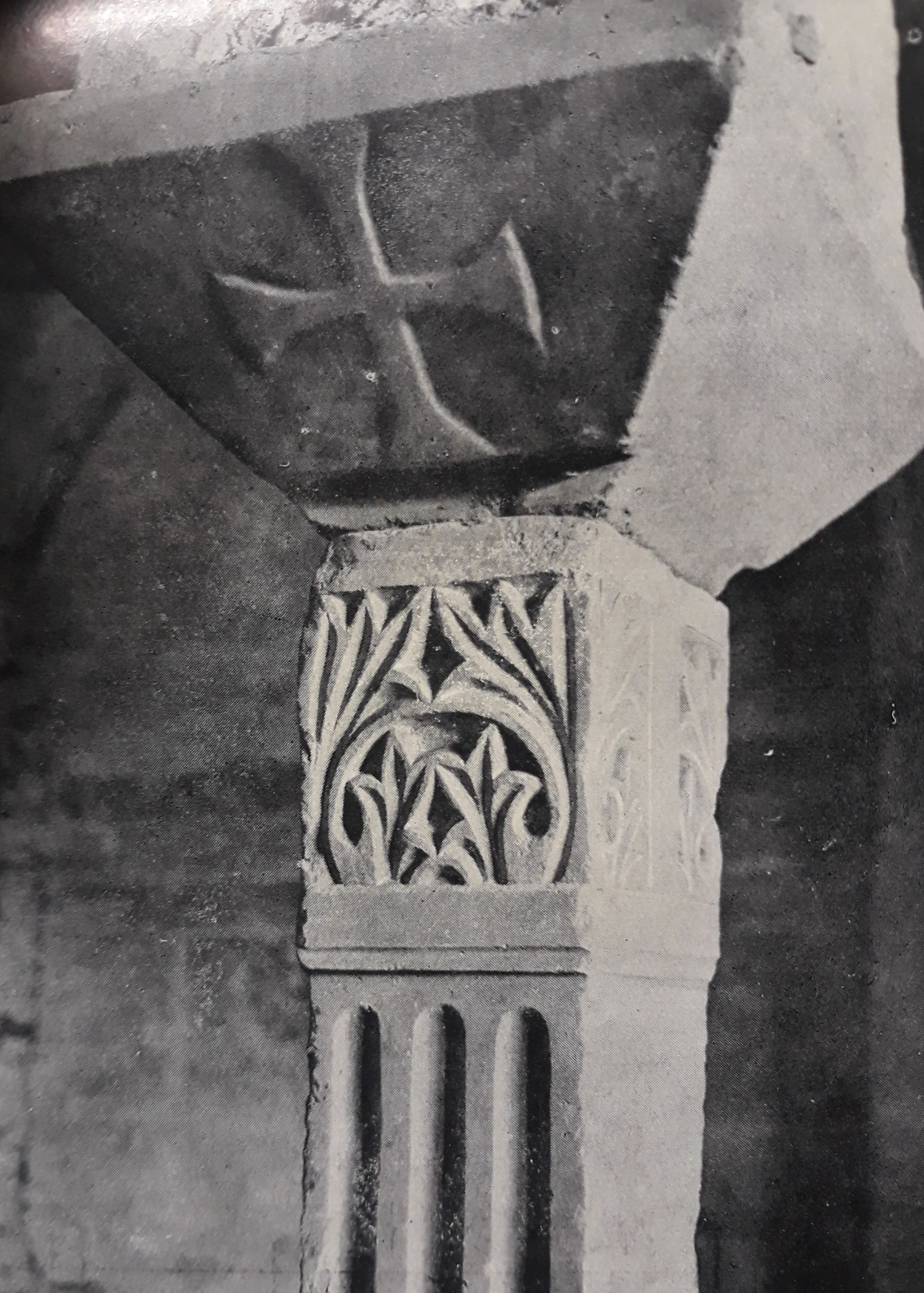
Basilica of San Zeno, Verona

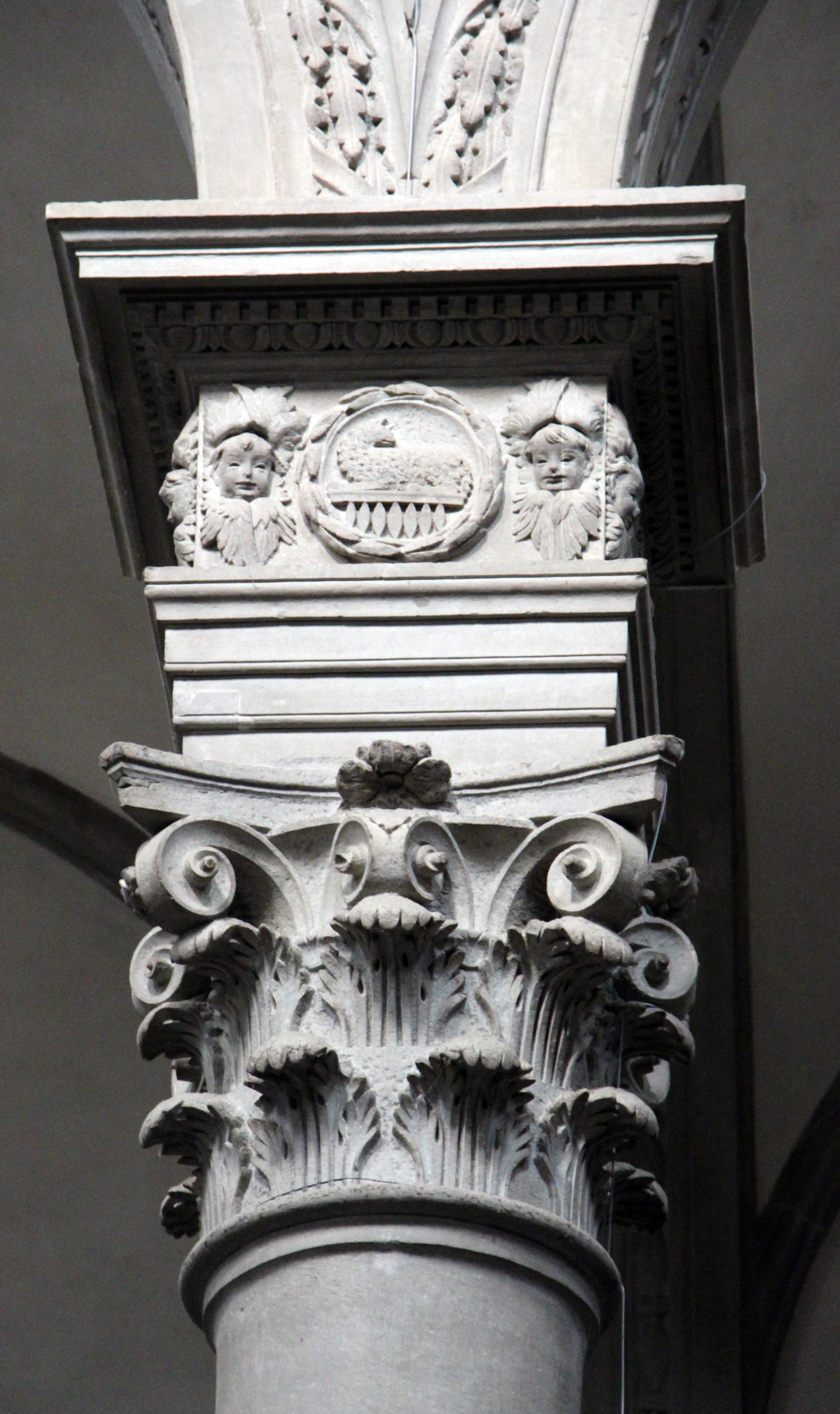
Basilica di San Lorenzo di Firenze

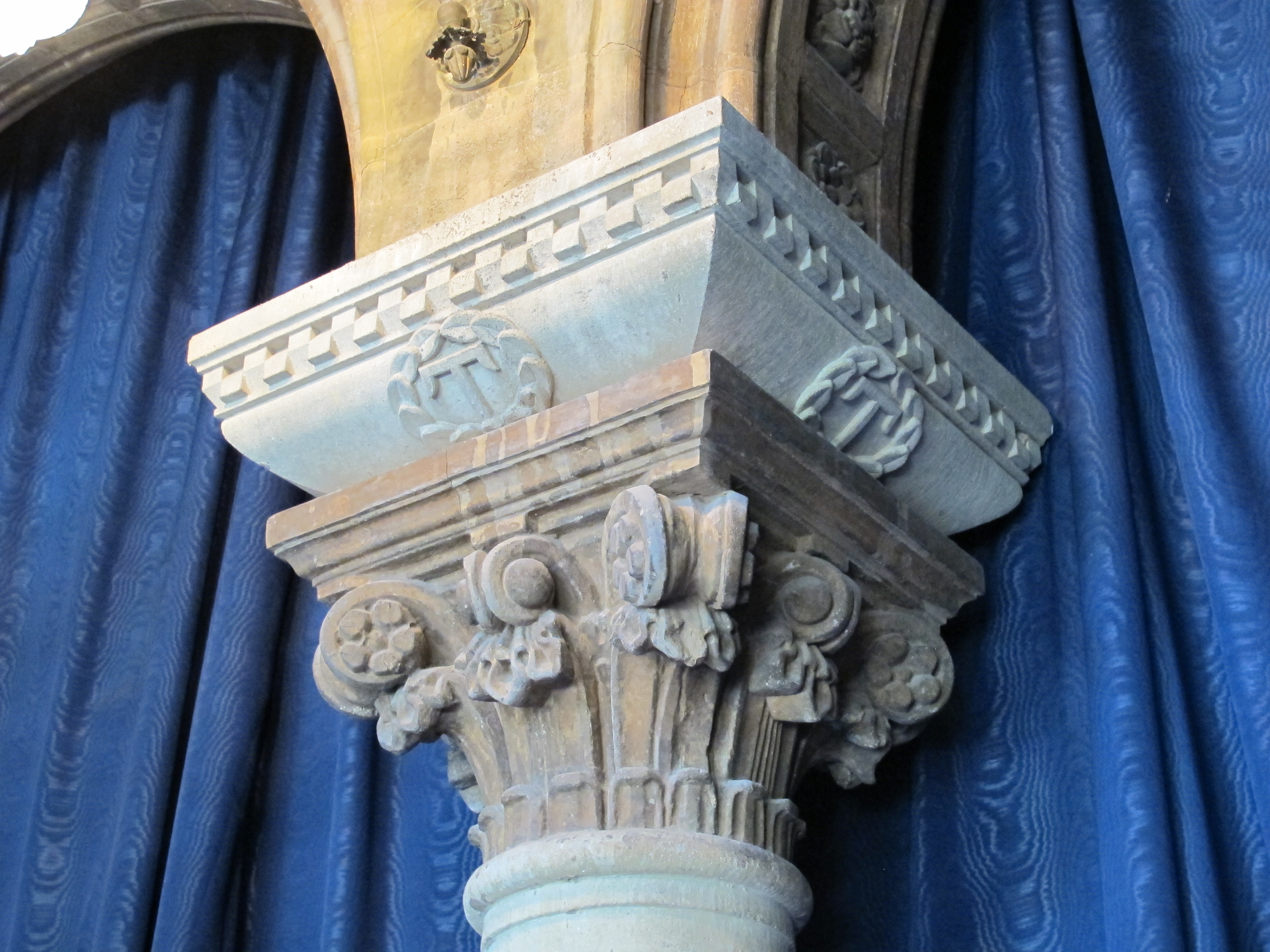
Pulvino over a capital

== See also ==
- Abacus
- Capital
- Impost
- Waterleaf
