= Impost (architecture) =

Architectural arch element

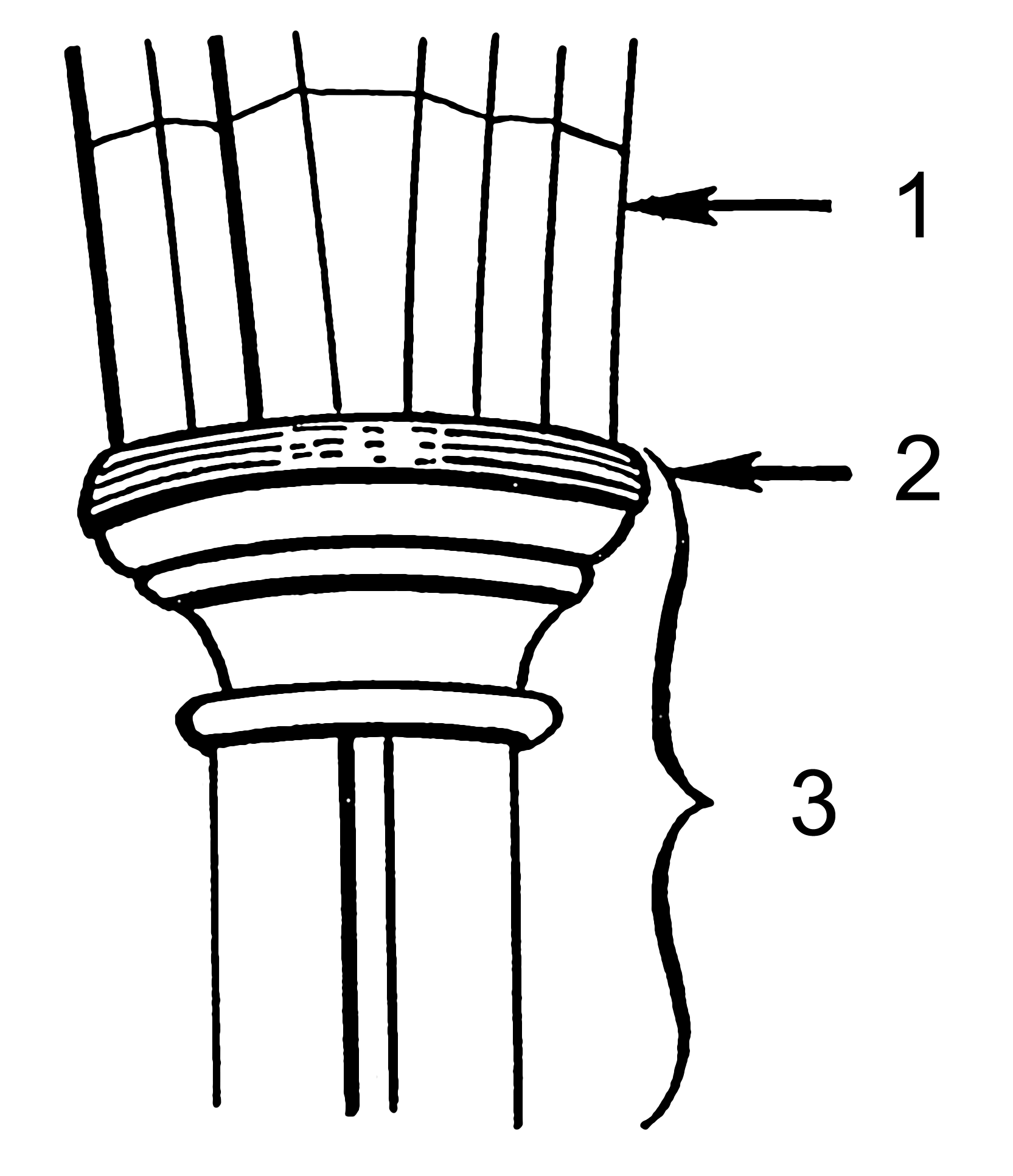
1. Arch 2. Impost 3. Column

In architecture, an impost or impost block is a projecting block resting on top of a column or embedded in a wall, serving as the base for the springer or lowest voussoir of an arch. The term impost capital is also used when appropriate.

== Ornamental training ==
The imposts are left smooth or profiled, and "then express a certain separation between abutment and arch." The Byzantine fighters are high blocks, which are sometimes referred to as pulvino. The Romanesque designed the impost ornamentally or figuratively, similar to the capitals. In the Gothic period, the fighter almost completely disappeared from the calyx bud capital. The architecture of the Renaissance returns to the formation of the imposts of the ancient column orders.

Sometimes, the complete entablature of a smaller order is employed, as in the case of the Venetian or Palladian window, where the central opening has an arch resting on the entablature of the pilasters which flank the smaller window on each side. In Romanesque and Gothic work, the capitals with their abaci take the place of the impost mouldings.

== See also ==
- Capital (architecture)
- Abacus (architecture)
- Pulvino
