= Leaf-and-dart =

Classical ornament used in friezes

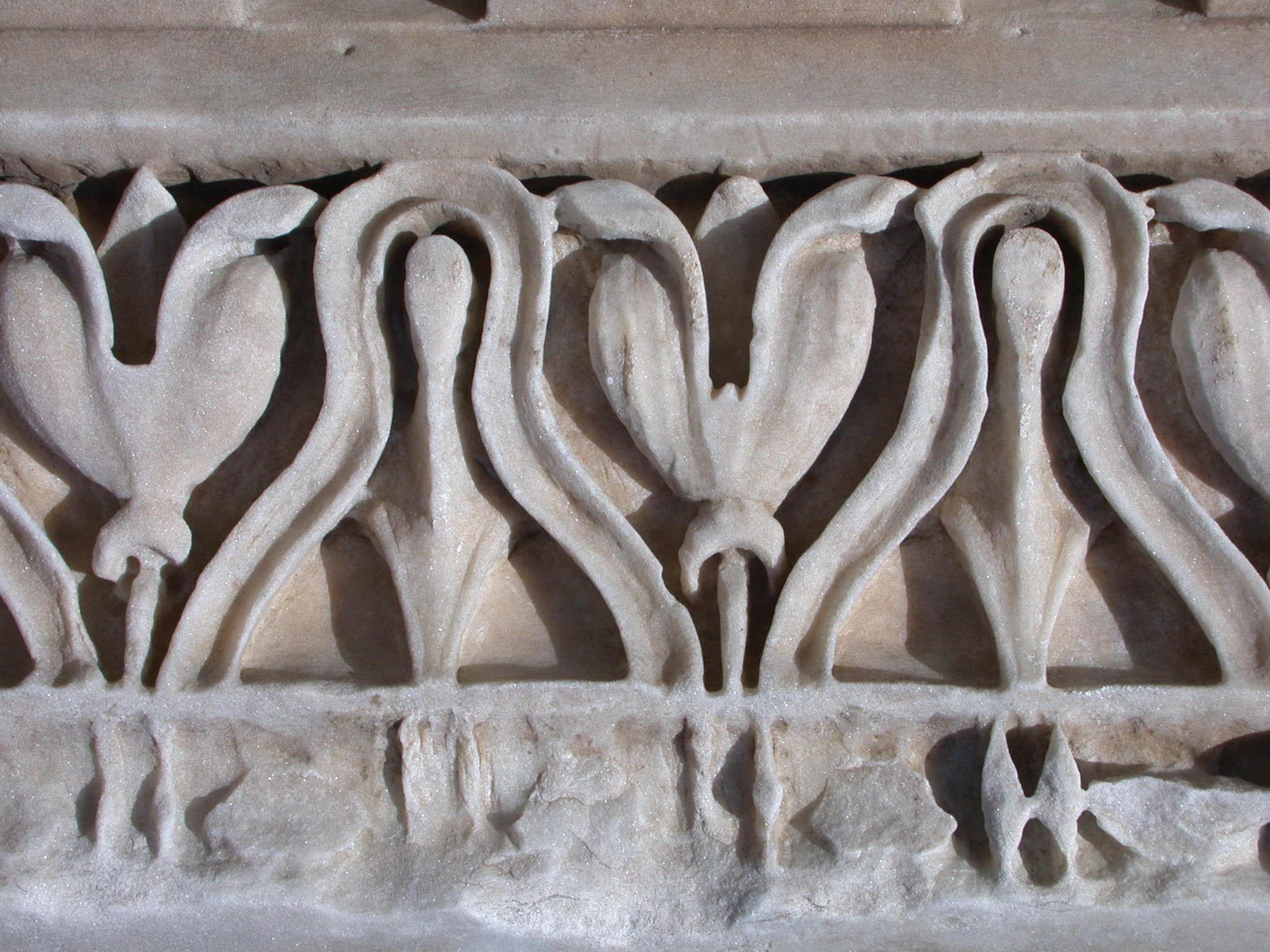
Relief with leaf-and-dart

Leaf-and-dart (also known as rais-de-cœur and heart-and-dart) is an ornamental motif made up of heart-shaped leaves (or waterleaves inside hearts) alternating with spearheads (or darts). This motif was used in Ancient Greek and Roman architecture. It was taken up again during the Renaissance, abundantly in the 18th century, being used in the Louis XVI style.

The French word literally means "rays (beams of light) from heart[s]" (its Italian equivalent being raggi a cuori), as the "darts" can resemble triangular lightrays emerging from between the hearts. The singular equivalent (rai-de-cœur) is rarely used.

== Gallery ==
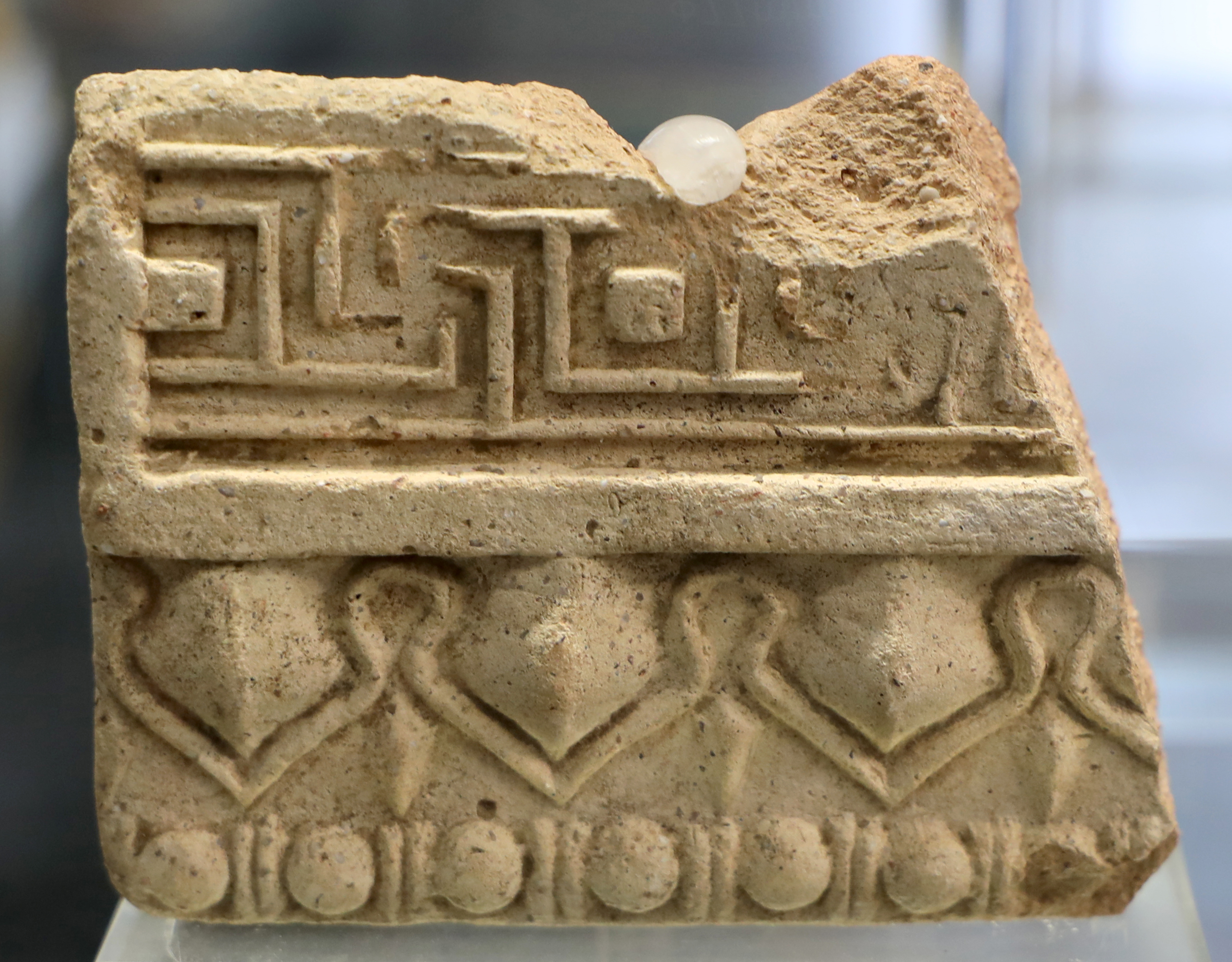
Ancient Greek leaf-and-dart on an antefix fragment, 450-400 BC, unknown material, Museo archeologico nazionale di Crotone, Crotone, Italy

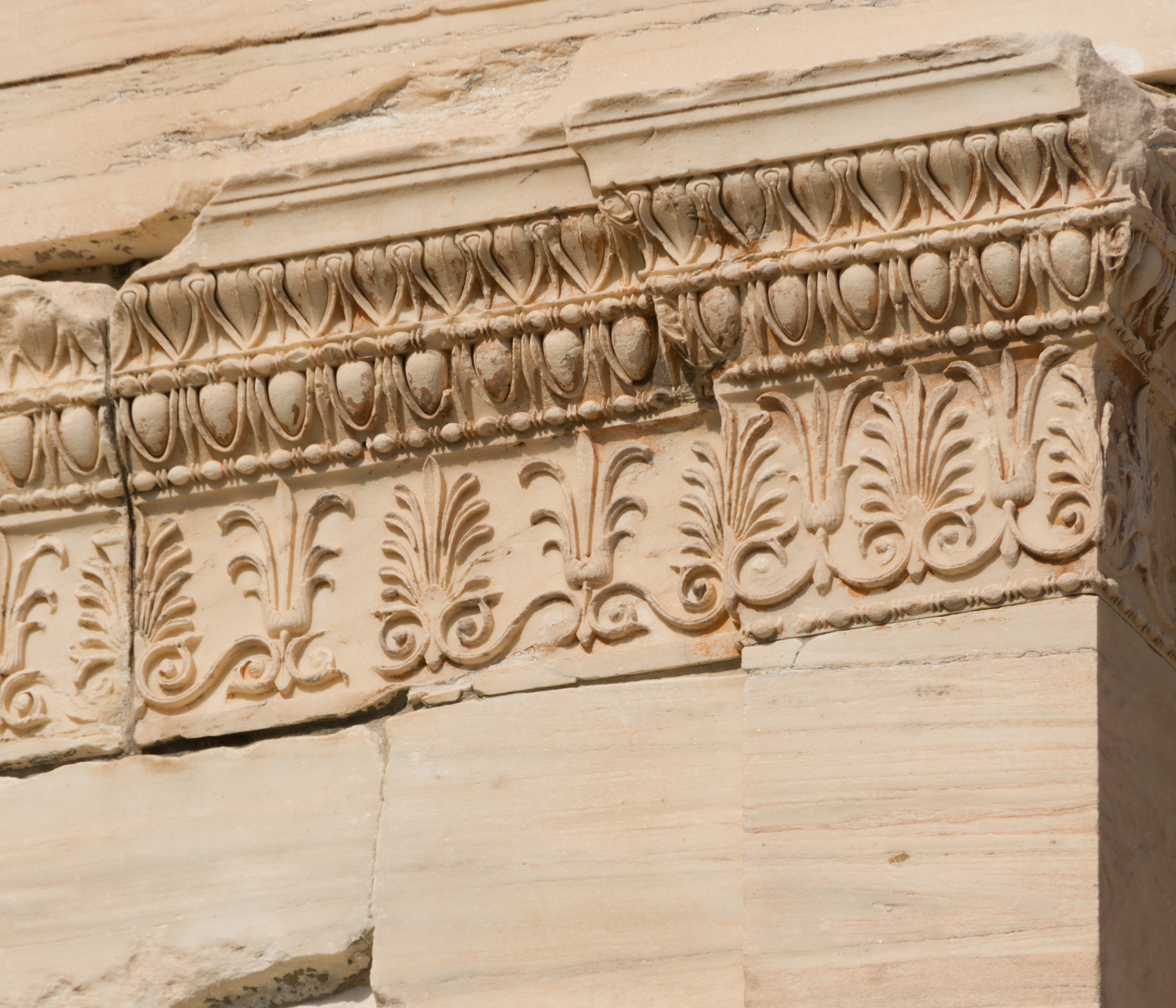
Ancient Greek leaf-and-dart (right above the egg-and-dart) on the Erechtheion, Athens, Greece, unknown architect or sculptor, 421-405 BC

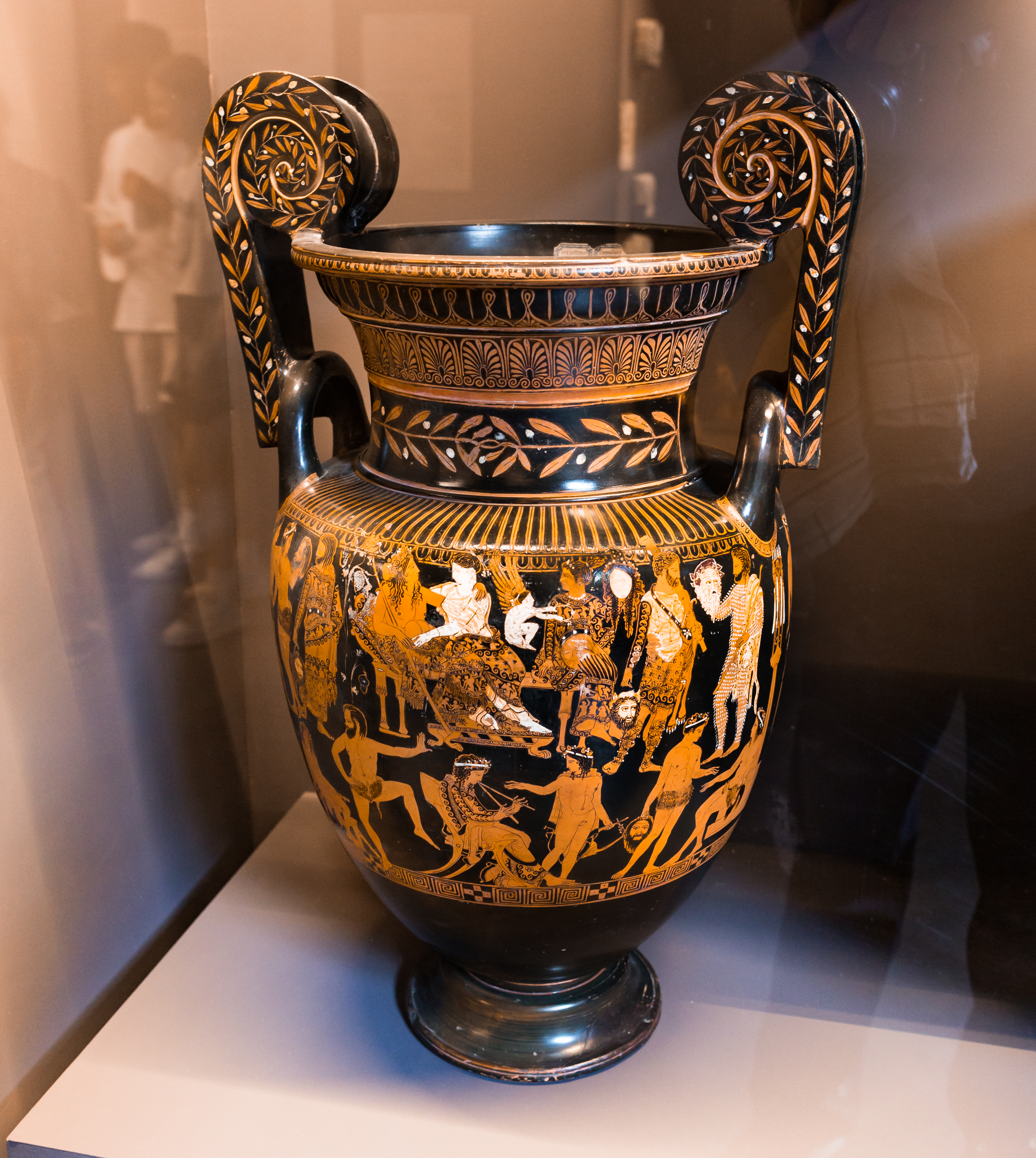
Ancient Greek leaf-and-dart painted (right under the egg-and-dart lip) on the Pronomos Vase, c.410, ceramic, National Archaeological Museum, Naples, Italy

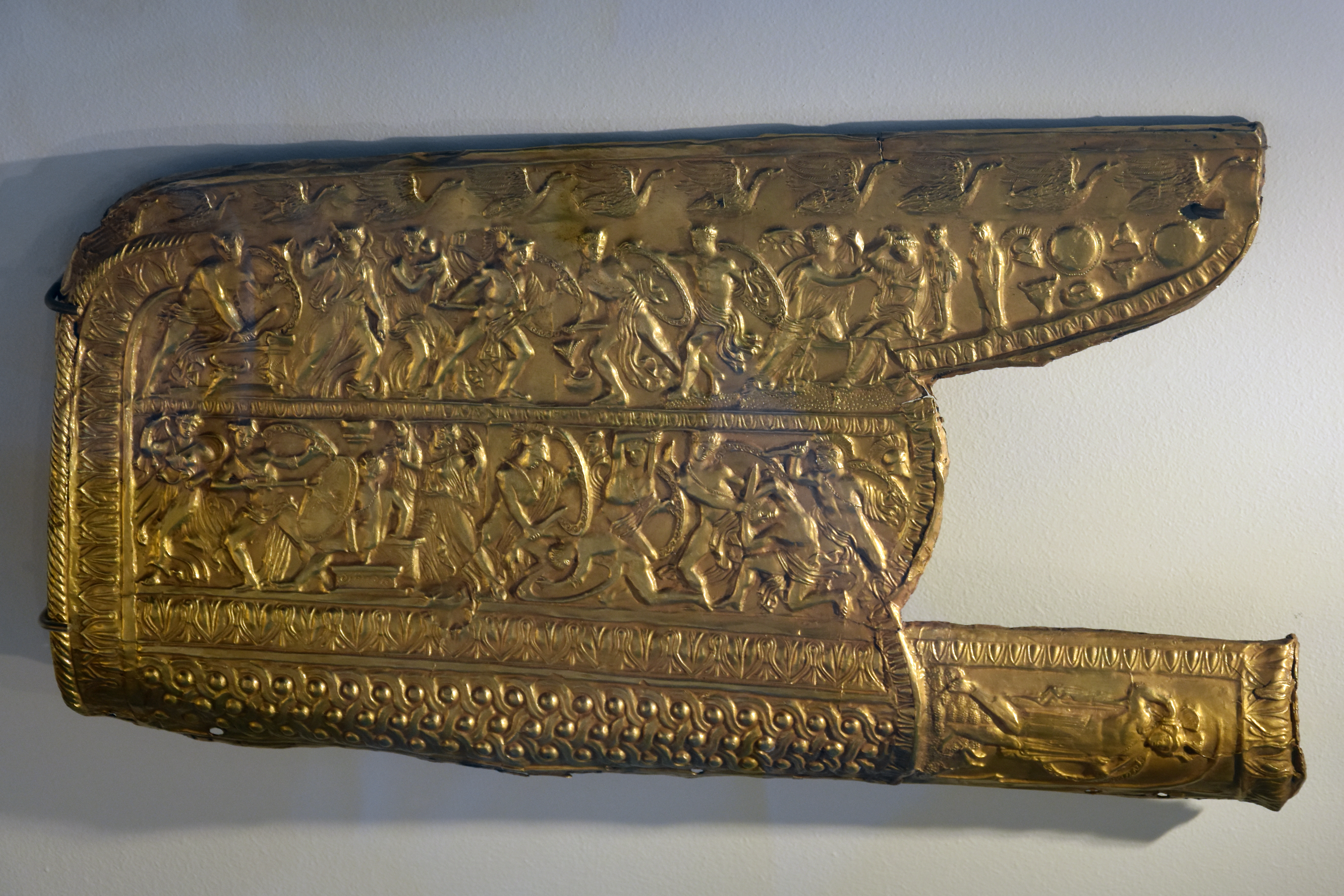
Ancient Greek leaf-and-dart on a gorytos, 400-336 BC, silver and gold, Museum of the Royal Tombs of Aigai, Vergina, Greece

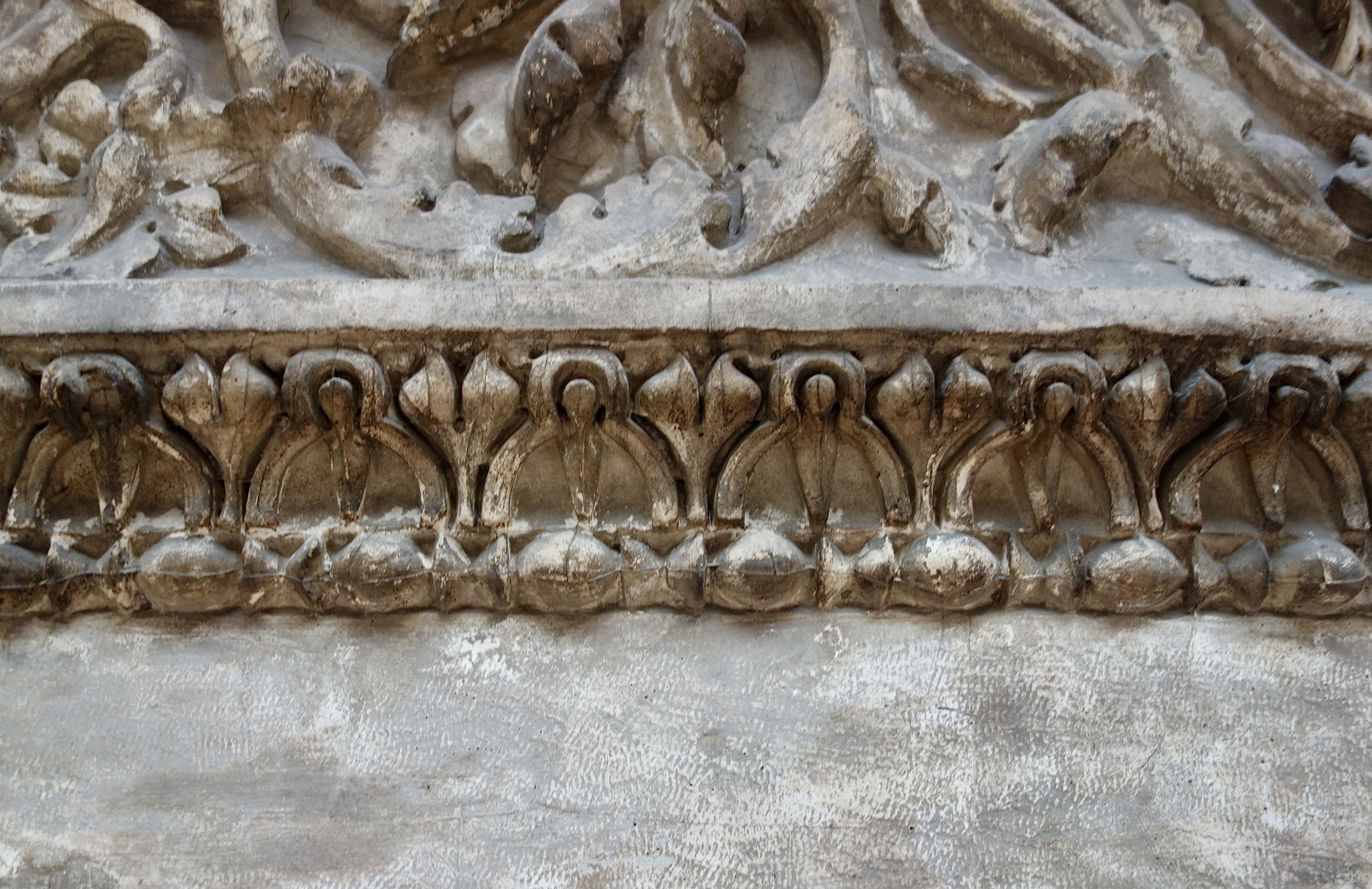
Roman leaf-and-dart of a portico of the Trajaneum from Pergamon, 115-130 AD, stone, Pergamon Museum, Berlin

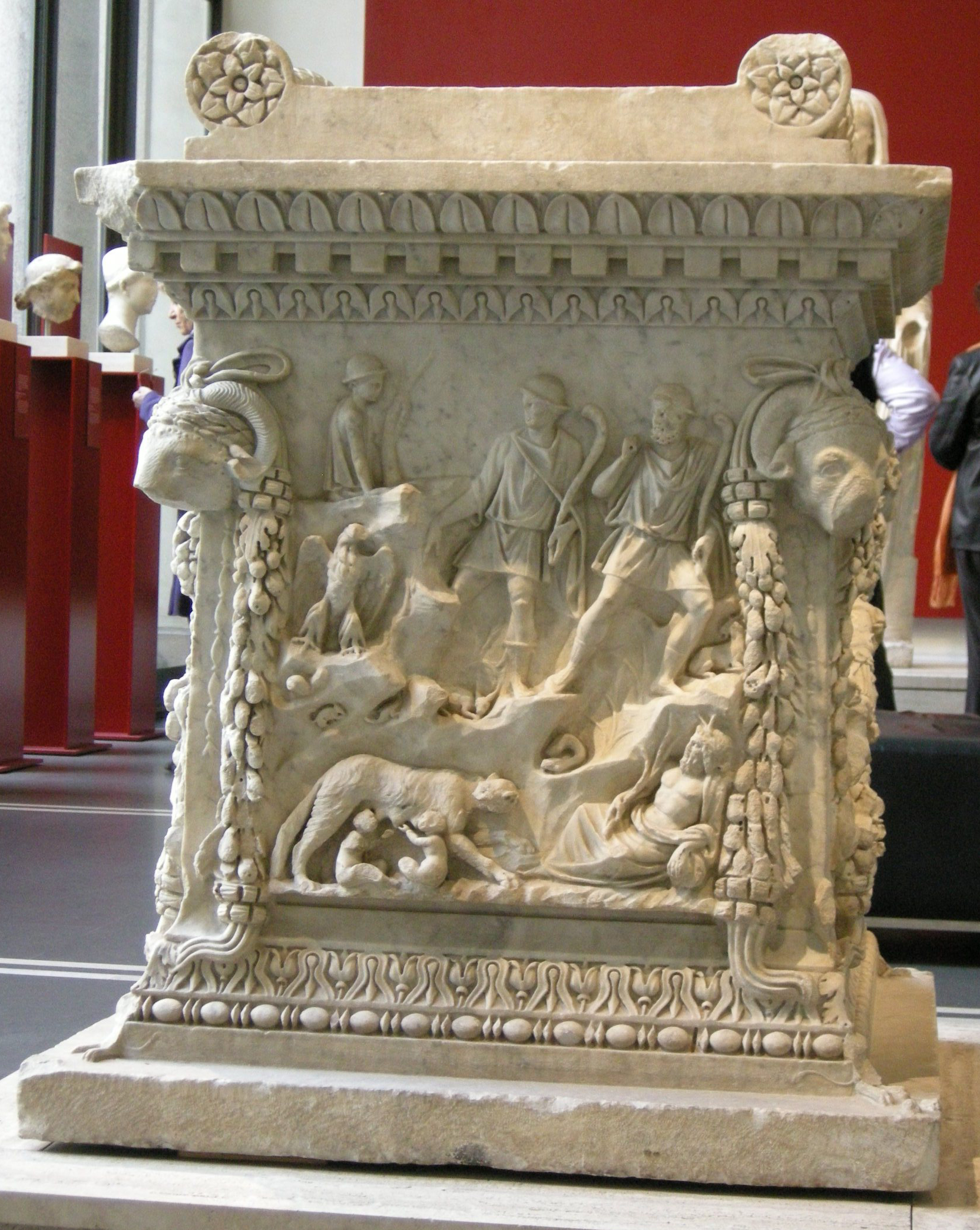
Roman leaf-and-dart on an altar of Mars and Venus, 124, marble, National Roman Museum of Palazzo Massimo, Rome

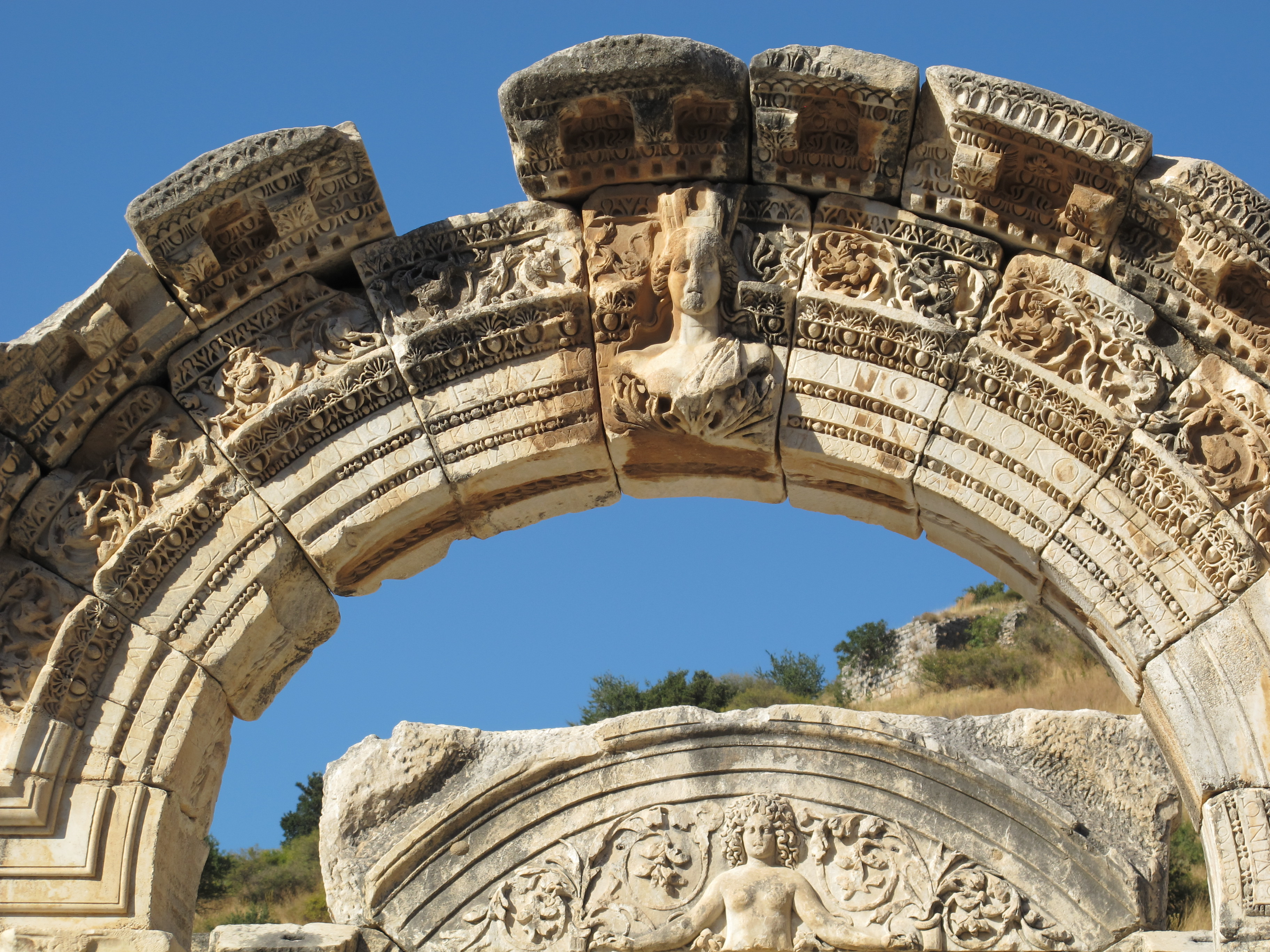
Roman leaf-and-dart right above the rinceaux and under the dentils, on the Temple of Hadrianus, Ephesus, Turkey, unknown architect, 138

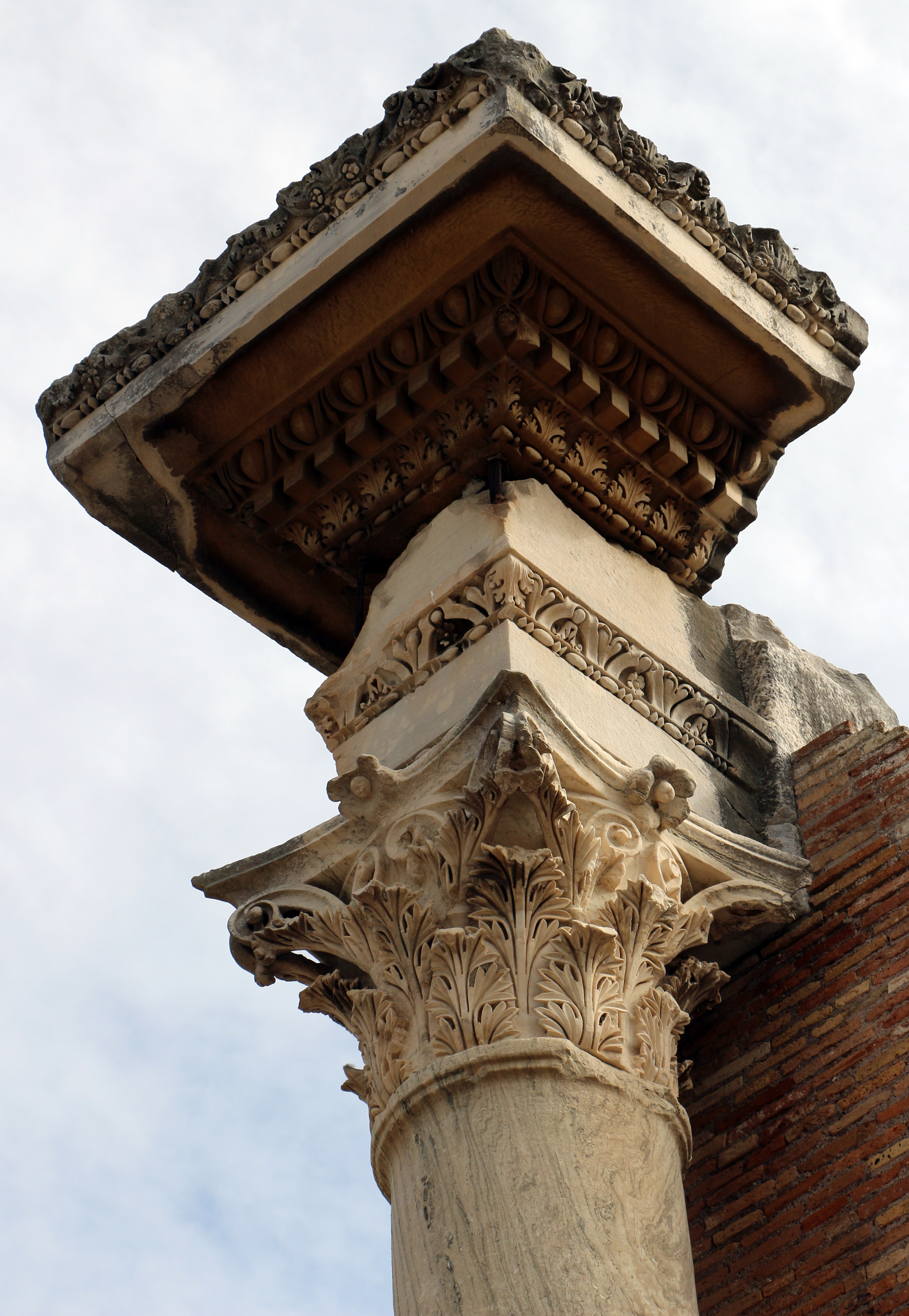
Roman leaf-and-dart on an entablature of the Baths at Ostia, Ostia Antica, near modern Ostia, southwest of Rome, unknown architect, unknown date

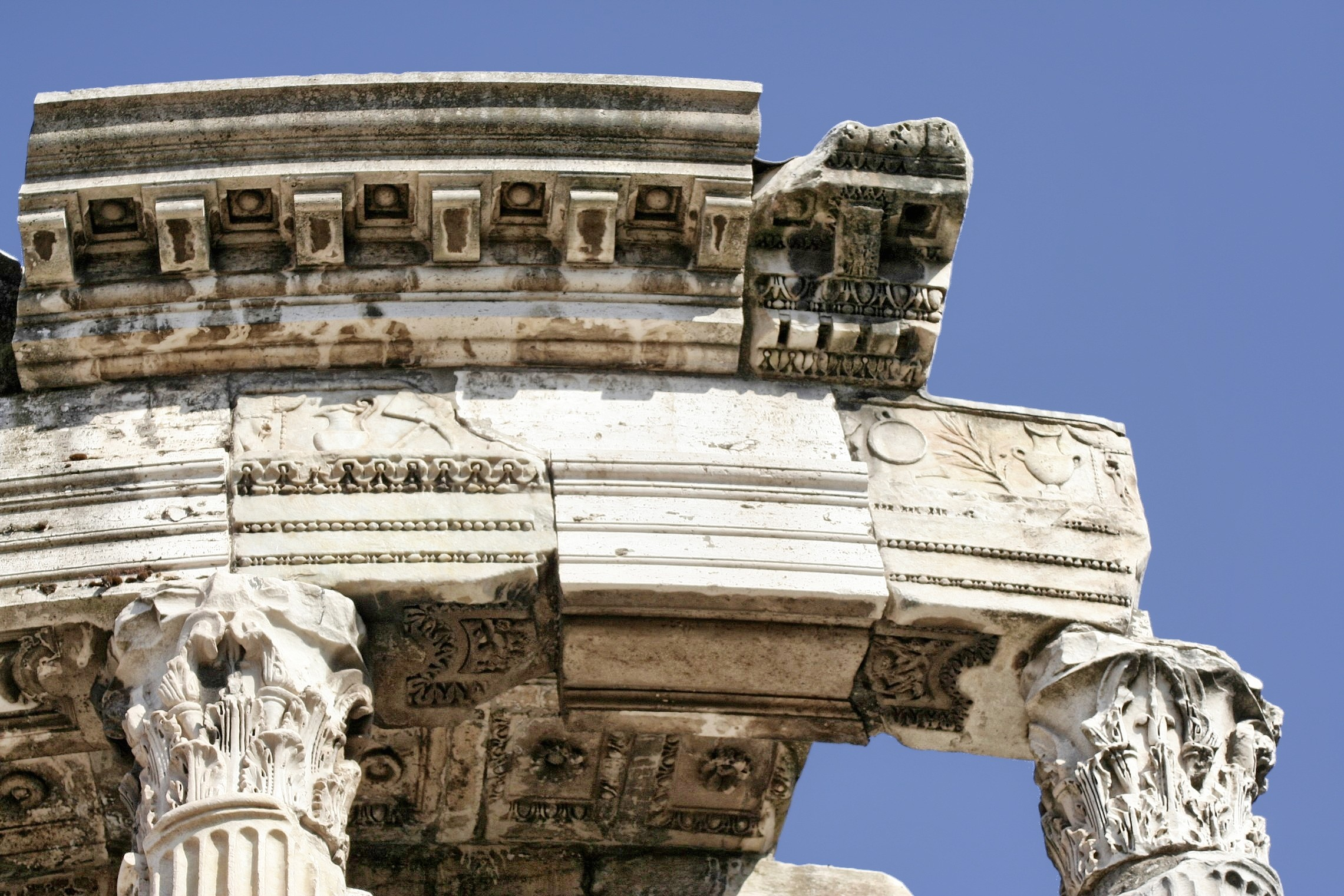
Roman leaf-and-dart on the entablature of the Temple of Vesta, Rome, unknown architect, unknown date

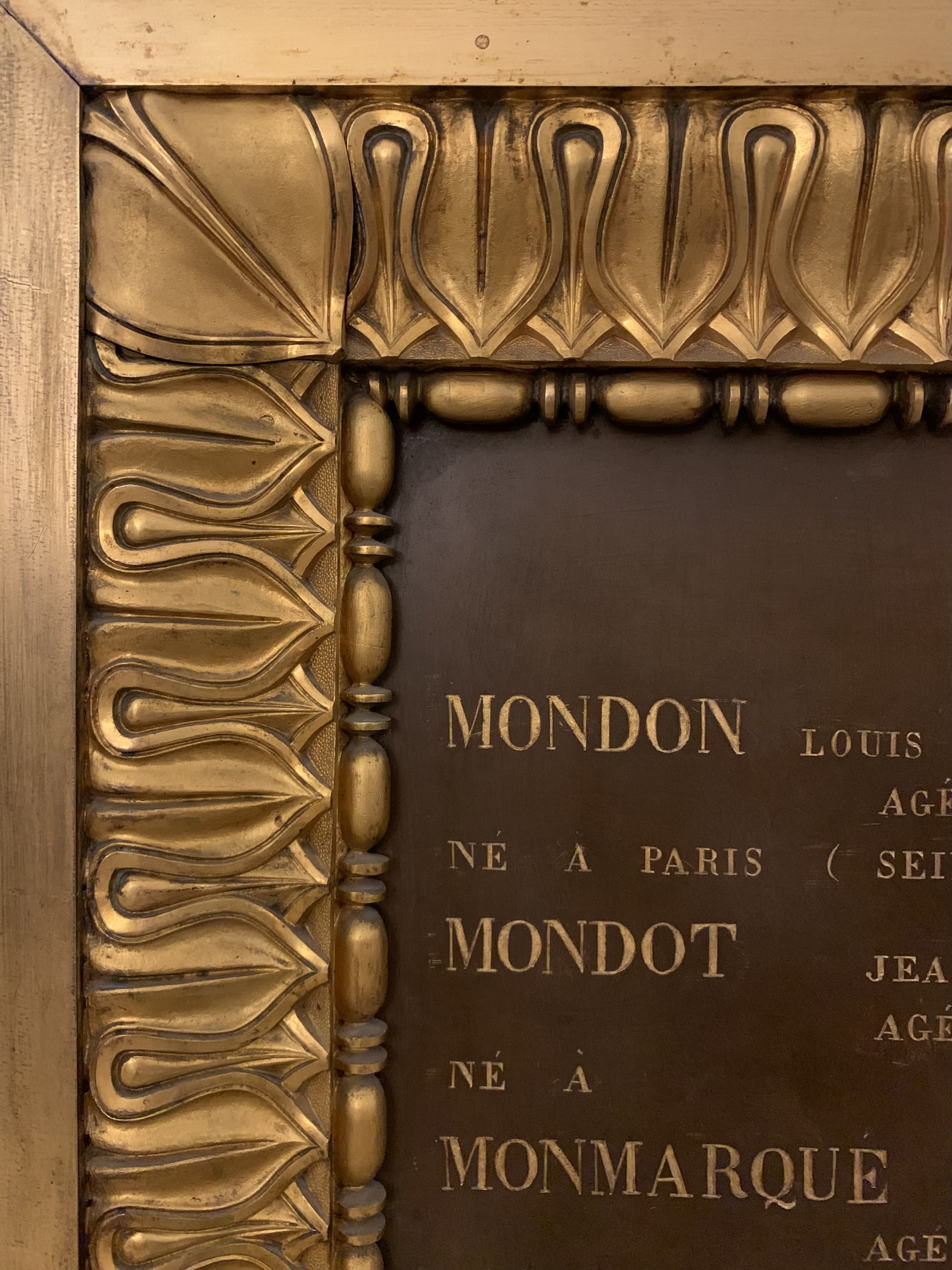
Neoclassical leaf-and-dart under the Panthéon, Paris, unknown architect, unknown date

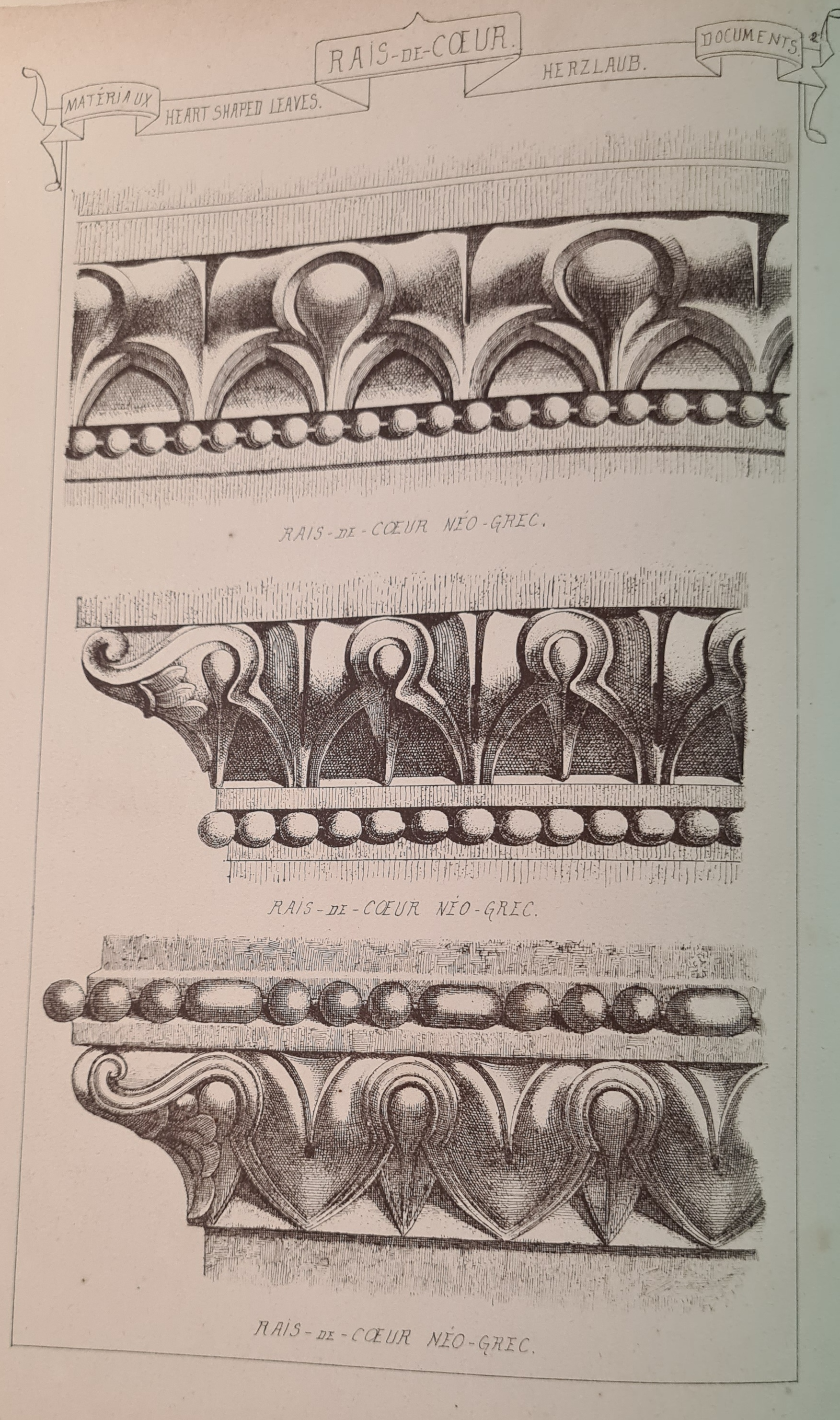
Greek Revival leaf-and-dart, illustrations from Materials and Documents of Architecture and Sculpture, by R. Raguenet, 19th century

== See also ==
- Egg-and-dart, a similar motif
