= Bowtell =

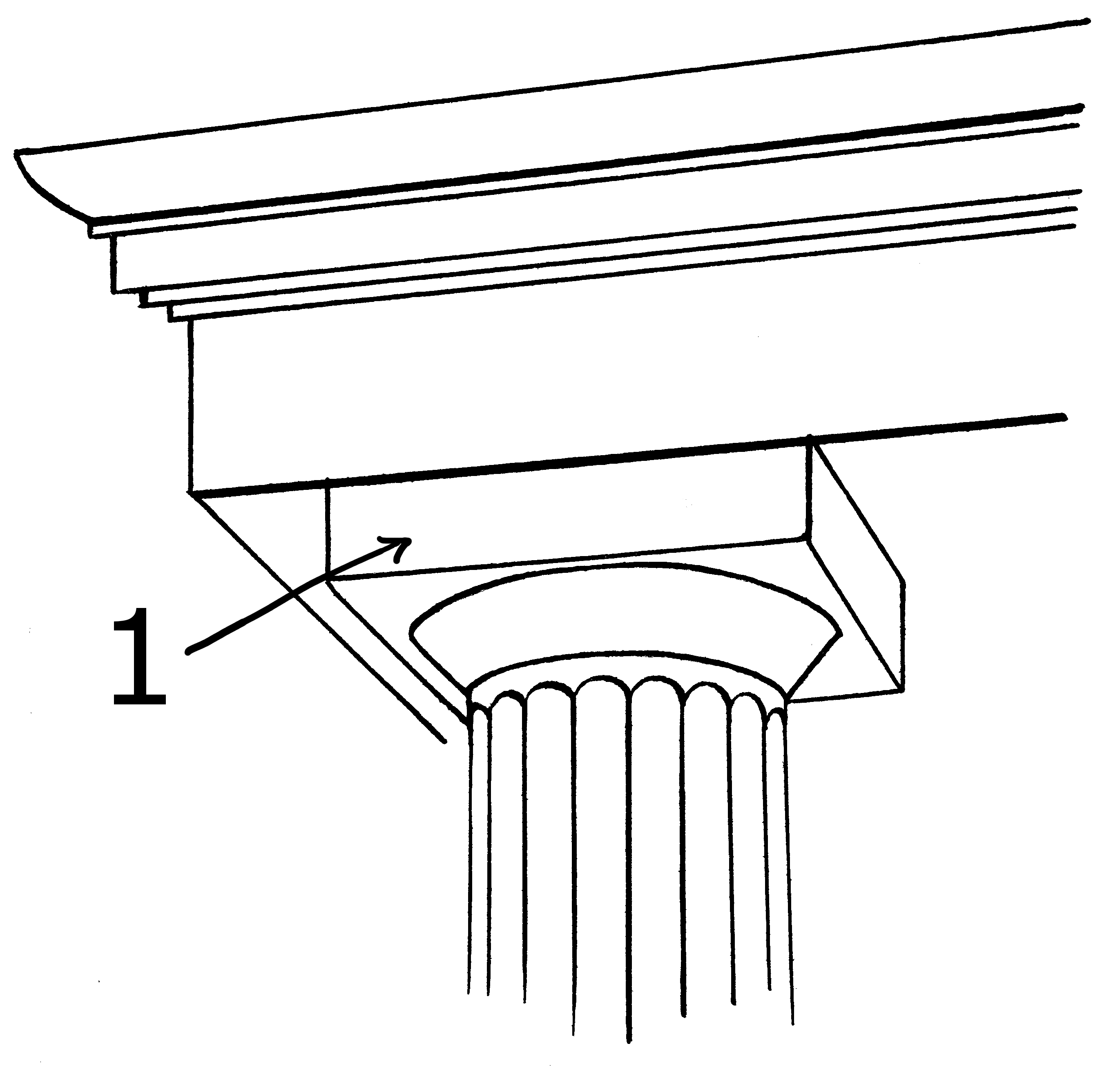
Bowtell - upwardly expanding curved surface found beneath the abacus - rectangle found on top of column, labelled number 1.

Bowtell is derived from the medieval term bottle; in architecture it refers to a round or corniced molding below the abacus in a Tuscan or Roman Doric capital; the word is a variant of boltel, which is probably the diminutive of bolt, the shaft of an arrow or javelin. A roving bowtell is one which passes up the side of a bench end and around a finial, the term roving being applied to that which follows the line of a curve.
