= Trial by water =

Trial by water can refer to:

- Trial by ordeal
- Castelseprio, the apocryphal Christian story of the trial of Mary and Joseph by water
