= Fondo Ambiente Italiano =

Italian national trust

- Founded: 1975
- Type: Nonprofit organization

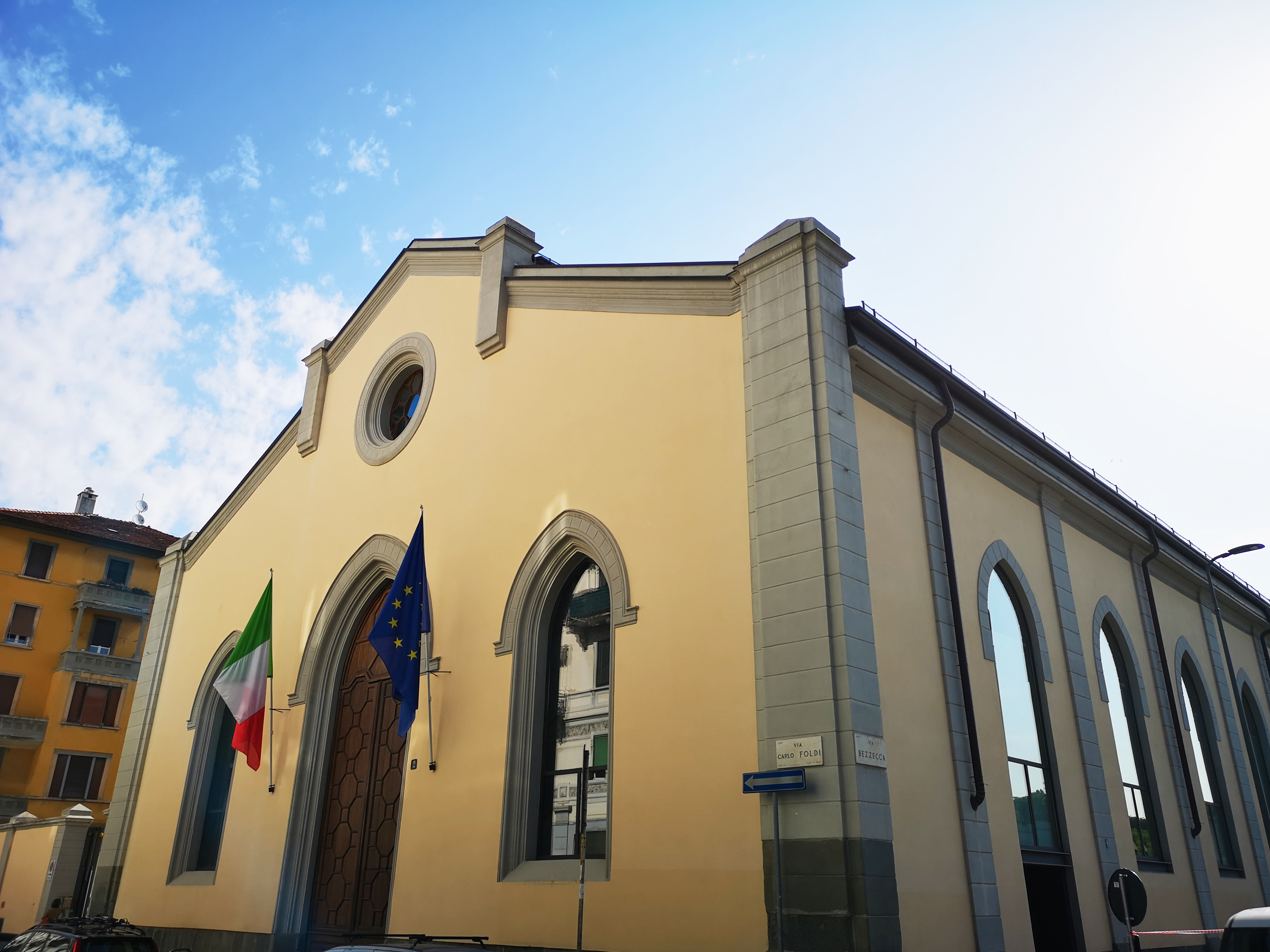
The headquarters in Milan

The Fondo Ambiente Italiano (FAI) is the National Trust of Italy.

The organisation was established in 1975 as the Fondo Ambiente Italiano, based on the model of the National Trust of England, Wales, & Northern Ireland. It is a private non-profit organisation and has over 190,000 members as of 2018. Its purpose is to protect elements of Italy's physical heritage which might otherwise be lost.

== History ==
The foundation goes back to the initiative of Elena Croce, the daughter of the Italian philosopher Benedetto Croce. Elena Croce wanted to apply the UK National Trust for Places of Historic Interest or Natural Beauty model to Italy. Giulia Maria Crespi, Renato Bazzoni, Alberto Predieri and Franco Russoli sign the founding act of the FAI in 1975. Shortly after its founding, the FAI received its first important foundations and donations.

The first donation was made in 1976 by the lawyer Piero de Blasi. He gave the FAI 1,000 m^{2} of land on Panarea, one of the Aeolian Islands off Sicily, thereby preventing much of the island from being built on and destroyed. In 1977 countess Emanuela Castelbarco, duchess d'Aquarone (granddaughter of Arturo Toscanini), donated the medieval Castle of Avio in Trentino, a property of the Castelbarco family since 1199 c., to the FAI. The FAI began an extensive restoration of the castle while allowing the Castelbarco family to continue to occupy parts of the castle. However, the FAI alone was responsible for the costs of the restoration, administration and later opening of the castle to the general public. The FAI thus established a new model of monument protection in Italy. Also in 1977, the FAI began restoration work at the Monastery of Torba, Castelseprio, in the northern Italian province of Varese. The monastery was initially purchased at her own expense by the founder of the foundation, Giulia Maria Mozzoni Crespi, and then donated to the FAI to save it from total decay. Today the monastery complex is one of the most important testimonies of the Lombards in Italy and thus a UNESCO World Heritage Site.

== Properties ==
As of early 2007 the organisation had twenty-two properties including castles, gardens, monastic buildings and other cultural assets. These are spread throughout Italy, but the majority are in the north of the country.

- Province of Agrigento
  - Giardino della Kolymbetra (Valle dei Templi, Agrigento)
- Province of Bergamo
  - Mulino di Baresi (Roncobello)
- Province of Como
  - Villa del Balbianello (Lenno, Lake Como)
- Province of Cuneo
  - Castello della Manta (Manta)
- Province of Genoa
  - Casa Carbone (Lavagna)
  - Historic barber's shop (Genoa)
  - San Fruttuoso Abbey (Camogli)
  - Torre di Punta Pagana (Rapallo)
- Province of La Spezia
  - Villa Rezzola (Lerici)
- Province of Lucca
  - Teatrino di Vetriano (also known as the Teatro Catalani) (Vetriano di Pescaglia)
- Province of Mantua
  - A kiosk in the Liberty style (Mantua)
- Province of Messina
  - Cala Junco (an area of Panarea, one of the Aeolian Islands)
- Province of Milan
  - Casa Necchi Campiglio Milan
  - Collezione Alighiero de' Micheli (Milan)
- Province of Naples
  - Bay of Ieranto (Massa Lubrense)
- Province of Padua
  - Villa dei Vescovi, Luvigliano, a frazione of Torreglia, in the Euganean Hills)
- Province of Rome
  - Park of the Villa Gregoriana (Tivoli)
- Province of Sassari
  - The Talmone Battery (Italian: Batterie Talmone) a system of military defenses (Palau)
- Province of Sondrio
  - Castel Grumello (Montagna in Valtellina)
- Trentino
  - Castello di Avio (Sabbionara di Avio)
  - The wildlife sanctuary of Maso Fratton-Valaia (Spormaggiore)
- Province of Turin
  - Castello di Masino (Caravino)
- Province of Varese
  - Torba Monastery (Gornate-Olona)
  - Torre di Velate (Varese)
  - Villa Della Porta Bozzolo (Casalzuigno)
  - Villa Panza (Varese)
- Province of Veneto
  - Brion tomb
