= Castle of Avio =

Medieval castle in Avio, Trentino, Italy

Coordinates: 45.7464°N 10.9521°E

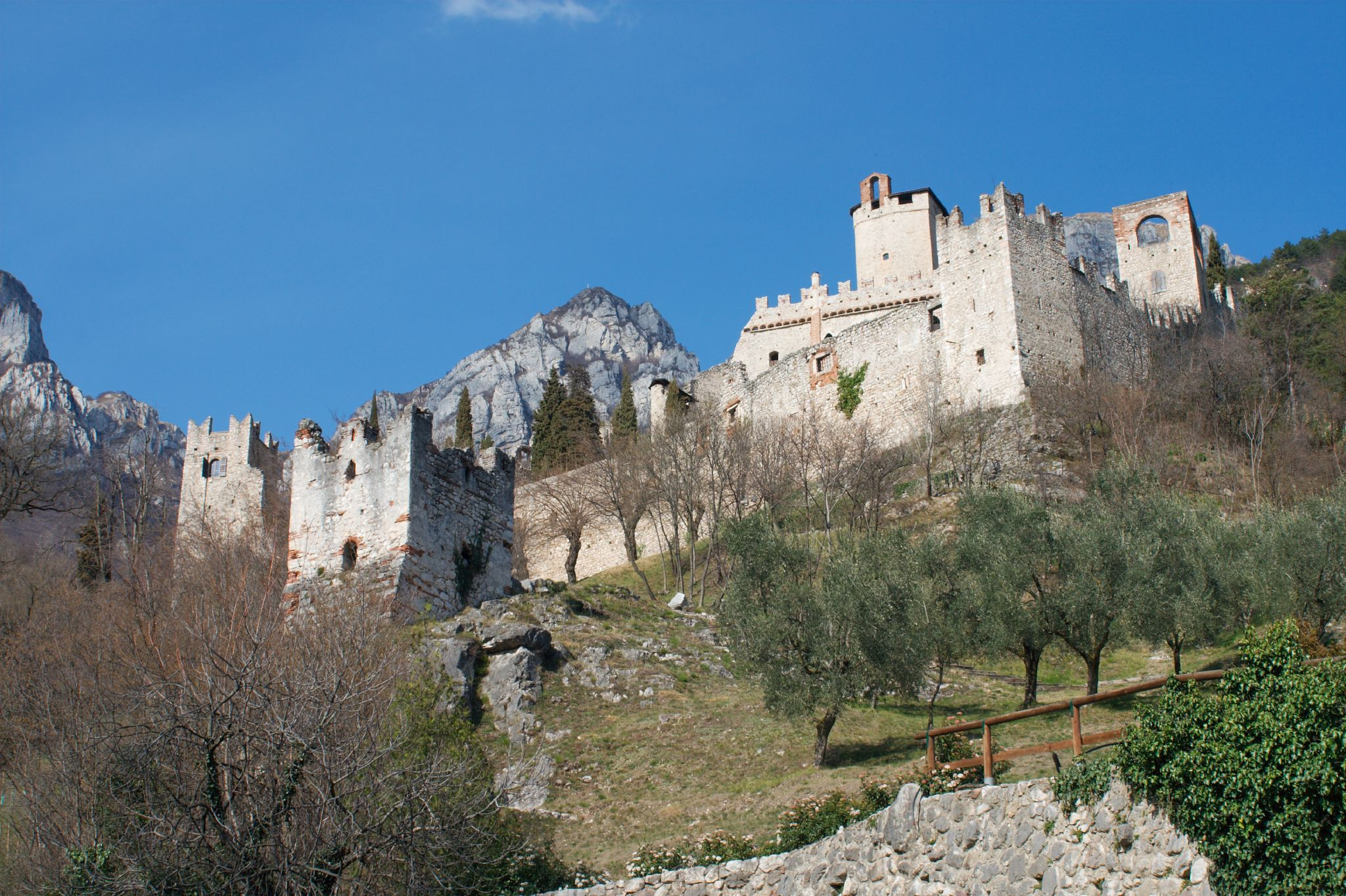
Castle of Avio

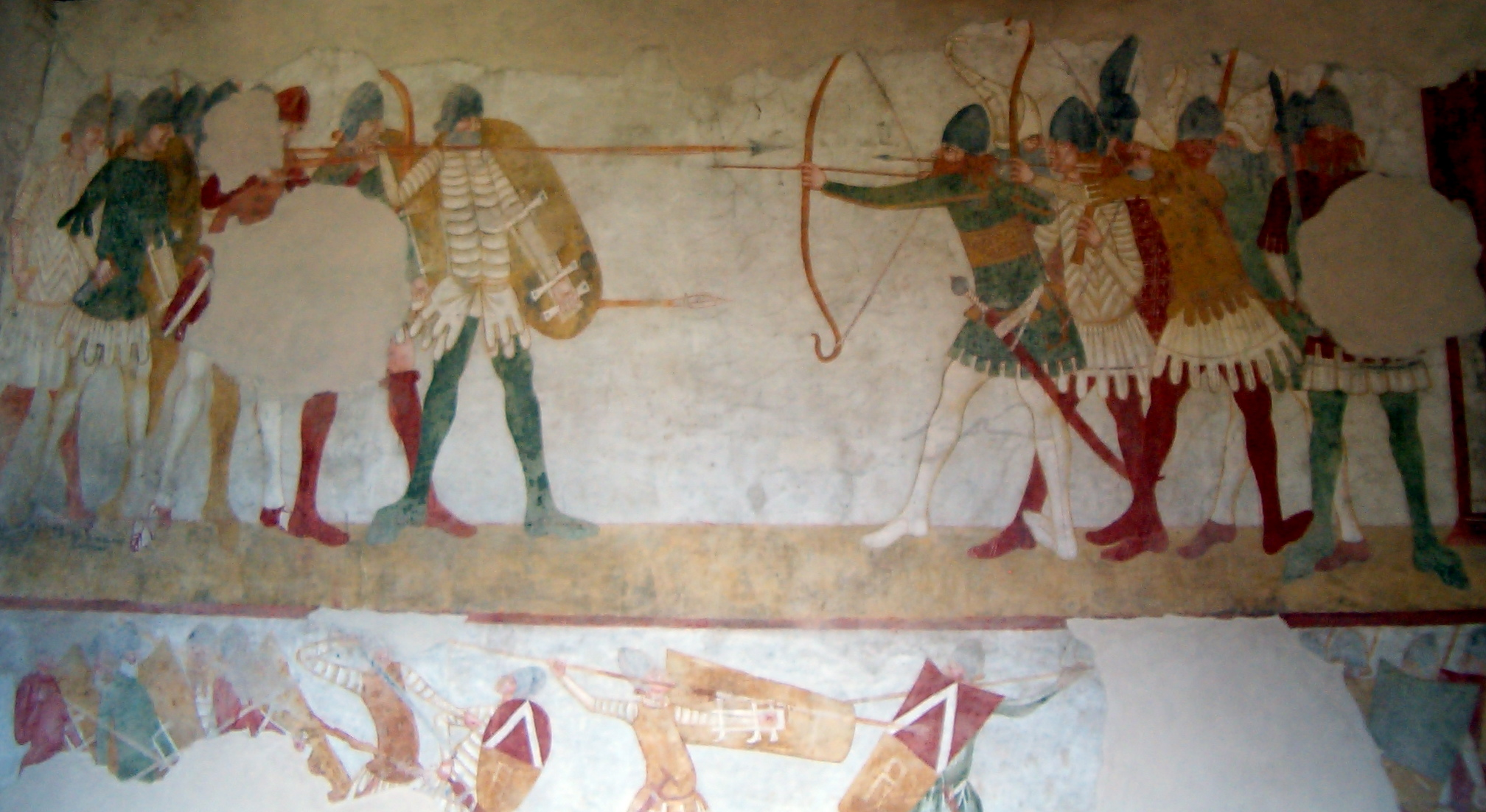
View of the frescoes in the castle

The Castle of Avio (also known as the Castle of Sabbionara, Italian: Castello di Avio, old German: Schloß Aue) is a medieval castle in the comune Avio, Trentino, northern Italy. It is currently held by the Fondo per l'Ambiente Italiano (FAI). It is one of the several castles commanding the Vallagarina valley of the Adige River. It features several rooms with medieval frescoes.

== History ==
The castle is mentioned for the first time in a 1053 document as Castellum Ava. In the 12th century it was owned by the Castelbarco family, who ceded it to the Republic of Venice in 1411. The latter enlarged it and added a chapel dedicated to St. George, together with a façade showing the doge's coats of arms.

In 1509 the castle was conquered by the troops of Maximilian I of Austria who, after painting his insignia on the façade, gave it to the counts of Arco. After several changes of property, in the 17th century the counts of Castelbarco bought it back.

== Architecture ==
The castle features three lines of walls, with five towers. Among the latter, the so-called Torre della Picadora was the place where executions (through hanging) were carried on. In the interior is the massive mastio, surrounded by several edifices, including the baronial Palace.

== Frescoes ==
The castle's rooms are decorated by a series of frescoes, undertaken in two different campaigns. The first is the "Chamber of Love" (Camera di Amore), dating to c.1330 and painted by an unknown workshop that had already worked in the Chiesa dei Domenicani in Bolzano. This room features scenes of love visible through the openings of a large painted brocade or curtain. Cupid, mounted on horseback, chases after a lover and shoots him with arrows. He is then shown making love to a young woman.

The second cycle was executed two or three decades later, c.1350, and features less elaborate paintings of battles.

== References and further reading ==
- Castelnuovo, E., ed. Castellum Ava. Il castello di Avio e la sua decorazione pittorica. Trent, 1987.
- Dunlop, Anne. "A Certain Inborn Suffering: Chambers of Love." In Anne Dunlop, Painted Palaces: The Rise of Secular Art in Early Renaissance Italy. University Park, PA: Pennsylvania State University Press, 2009.
- Dunlop, Anne. “The Look of Love.” In A Wider Trecento: Studies in 13th- and 14th-Century European Art Presented to Julian Gardner, eds. Louise Bourdua and Robert Gibbs, 154–165. Leiden and Boston: Brill, 2012.
