= Paluselli =

Paluselli is an Italian surname. Notable people with the surname include:

- Cristina Paluselli (born 1973), Italian cross-country skier
- Ignazio Paluselli (1744–1779), Italian painter
