= Torba Abbey =

Unesco world heritage site in northern Italy

Coordinates: 45.7294°N 8.8633°E

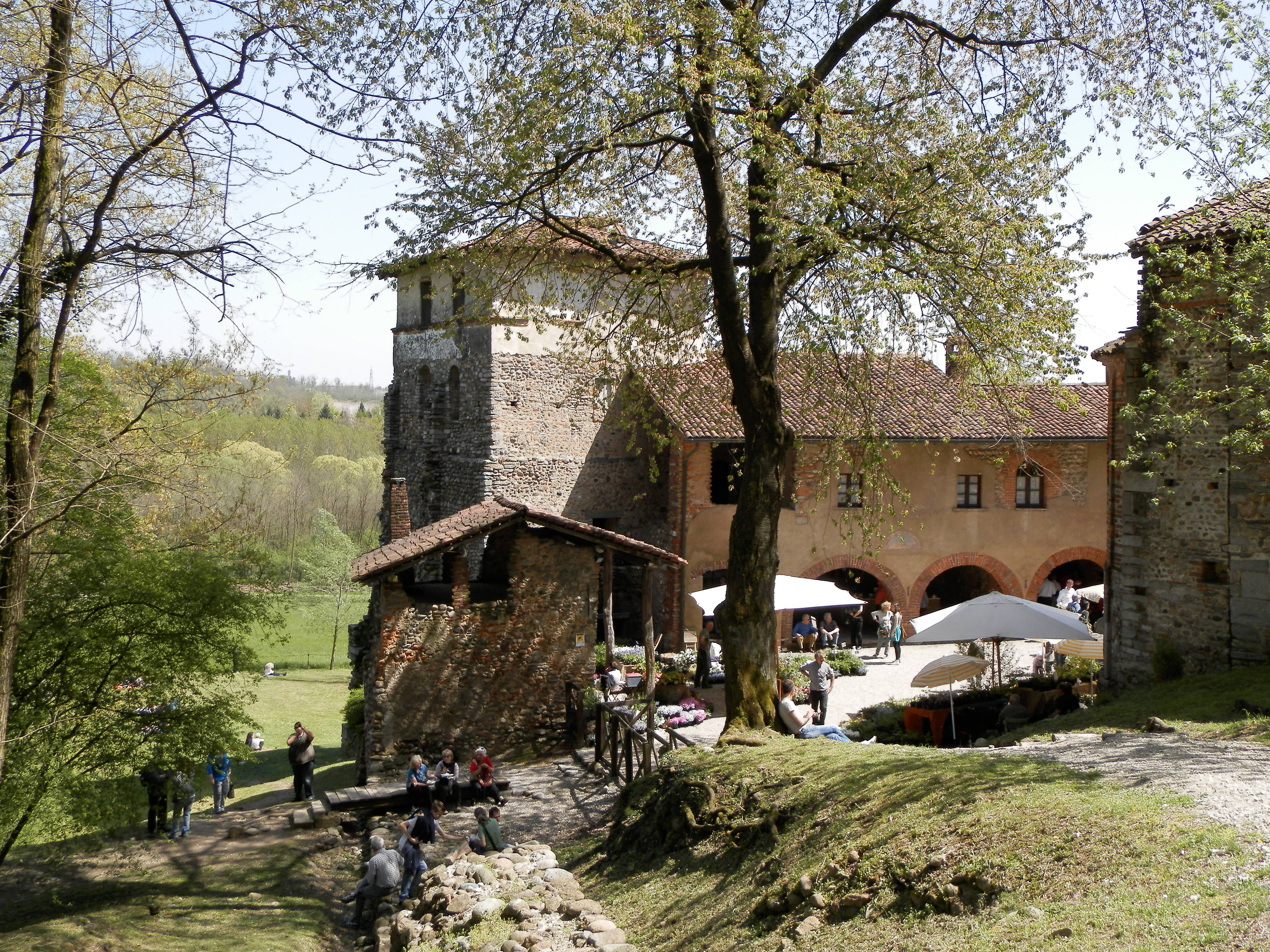
Torba Monastery: view over the tower and the ditch below

Torba Abbey, otherwise Torba Monastery (Italian: monastero di Torba, abbadia di Torba) is a former Benedictine nunnery in Torba, a frazione of Gornate Olona, Lombardy, Italy, in the Castelseprio Archaeological Park. The buildings are part of a list of structures associated with "Longobards in Italy, Places of Power (568–774 A.D.)", that is dating to the Lombard era of the early middle ages. The abbey was entered on the UNESCO List of World Heritage Sites in June 2011.

== History ==
The first nucleus of the Castelseprio complex, of which Torba is part, originated under the Romans in the fifth century A.D. as part of one of the military outposts built to defend against barbarian incursions along the south-western face of the Alps. The area around the river Olona where Torba was founded, the Seprio (originally called Sibrium), was a place of some strategic importance in the Roman period, partly because of its water supply, partly because of its position on an important axis of communication across the Alps. A castrum or fortress was built here, the origin of the present Castelseprio. One of its outliers was a look-out station and tower, at what is now Torba.

The castrum was used over the next few centuries by the Goths, the Byzantines and finally the Lombards. During the long period of the pax longobarda the group of buildings at Torba lost its military function and acquired a religious one, thanks to the settlement here in the 8th century of a group of Benedictine nuns, They led to the construction of a monastery, adding to the original structures further buildings to accommodate the cells, the refectory and the oratory, as well as a portico of three arches to shelter travelers and pilgrims. In the 11th century, a new small church dedicated to the Virgin Mary. During the Frankish period the Seprio became the seat of a count, thus acquiring additional agricultural importance. In the following centuries it became a battleground for some of the most powerful Milanese families, especially the Della Torre and the Visconti in the 13th century. In 1287, Ottone Visconti, Archbishop of Milan, in order to stop his rivals using the fortifications against him, ordered the demolition of the castrum of Castelseprio, with the exception of the religious buildings. At Torba the nunnery included the Roman tower, which thus survived.

From the extant documents (the earliest date from 1049) it is possible to reconstruct the history of the abbey, particularly during the Renaissance. Once order was restored to Lombardy, many noble families sought to have an abbess appointed of their own kin, until the nuns moved to Tradate in 1482, under the influence of the Pusterla family, leaving the site to cultivation by tenant farmers. So began the so-called "agricultural period" of the complex until 1799, in the time of Napoleon, and the suppression of the religious orders. Torba lost all monastic connection, and the buildings were converted to purely utilitarian agricultural purposes: the portico was walled up, the entrance to the church was widened so that it could be better used as a store for carts and tools, and the frescoes were whitewashed over.

The property changed hands many times in the following years, until in 1971, the last farming family abandoned it. After further years of neglect it was acquired in 1977 by Giulia Maria Mozzoni Crespi who gave it to the Fondo per l'Ambiente Italiano, which restored it. In 1986, the long restoration was completed and the site opened to the public.

== Architecture ==
=== Church ===
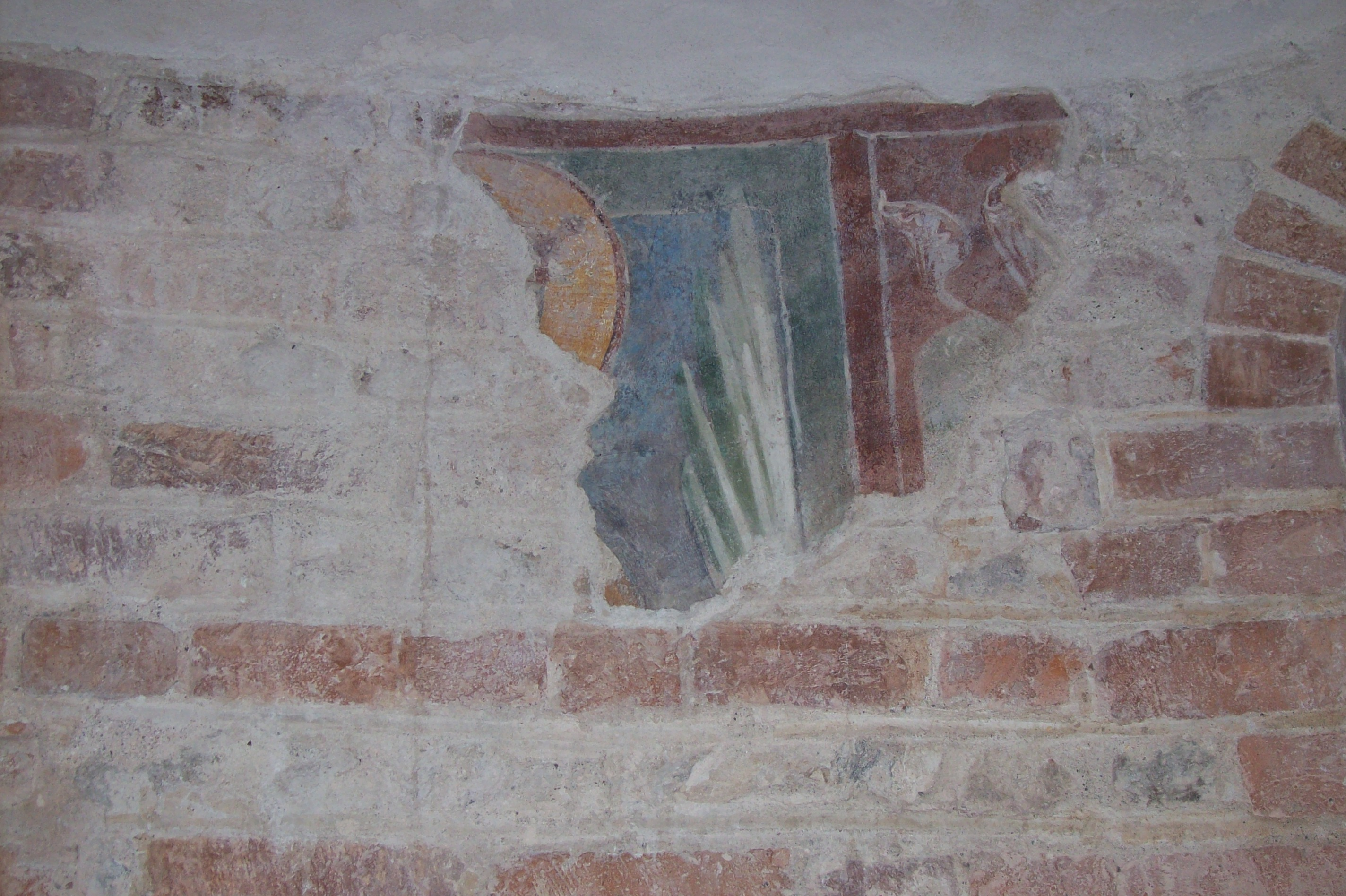
A fragment of the remains of the frescoes

The church, dedicated to the Virgin Mary, was built in several phases between the 8th and 13th centuries, using stones collected from the river Olona bound with sand and lime. The interior contains traces of an earlier ecclesiastical structure: the remains of a campanile with a square outline, pre-dating the present construction, are still visible. The external wall of the apse, with large pebbles, has four lesene dividing it into five parts, within which are single window openings in splayed surrounds. The upper perimeter is decorated with "hanging" or inverted arches in cotto brick, which create an interesting chromatic effect popular in Lombard Romanesque architecture. Inside the church, some tombs have been rediscovered and a crypt with an ambulatory, datable to the 8th century, which is reached by two flights of stone stairs set into the side walls. To the originally rectangular church was added in the 12th and 13th centuries an apse of tufa and brick. To increase the capacity of the building a removable wooden mezzanine structure was added to the main body of the church, over the crypt.

The pictures on the limed walls, because of their poor state of preservation, are rather fragmentary and do not permit the exact identification of their subject matter. The frescoes have two identifiable phases of the frescoes: the older one is of the 9th-10th centuries, and the later one of the 11th-13th centuries. Some visible fragments on the campanile are of the later phase: among them can be identified the face of Joachim, together with the inscription (A)KIM. The variety in the external walling testifies to the tortuous history of the church through the centuries.

=== Abbey ===
The restoration works of the FAI have brought to light the large arches of the portico of the main conventual building, now a refreshment area, set on the Roman line of the wall, still visible inside the refectory, where can also be seen the large original fireplace. The portico was a provision for pilgrims and travellers, who were thus enabled to rest under its cover and to make use of the oven near which is the stairway leading to the upper floor of the tower.

=== Tower ===
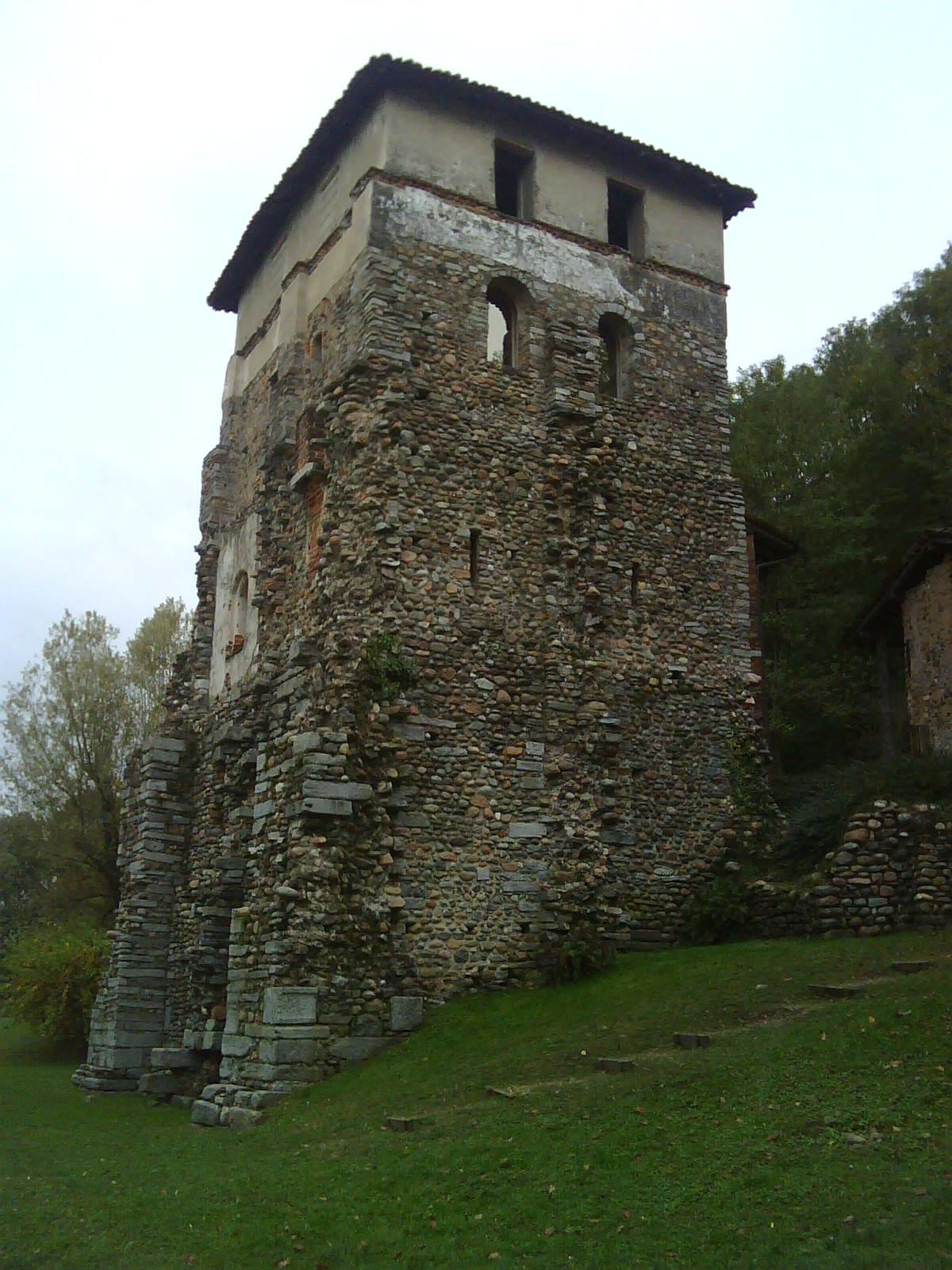
The tower of Torba

The tower, the function of which was to provide a look-out inside the Roman defensive system, forms the point closest to the Olana river and is one of the few remaining specimens in northern Italy of Roman defensive architecture of the 5th-6th centuries. Built of materials salvaged from demolished Roman burial grounds, it is characterised by a powerful yet slender construction. The perimeter walls progressively reduce in thickness from the base (about 2 metres) up to the roof level, where they are about 85 cm, creating a series of steps (known as "offsets") which are visible both inside and outside the structure, which is more than 18 metres high. The angles of the walls are also reinforced with buttresses.

The tower interiors show more evidently the complex history of the building: on the first floor - indeed, next to the loophole windows of the military period - is an ogive window of the 15th century. The scraps of fresco remaining on the walls and the niches cut into them are evidence that in the Lombard period this room was used as the burial place of the abbesses. Among those frescoes still legible can be made out the figure of a nun which has in the inscription the typically Lombard name of Aliberga, and a cross with the Alpha and Omega on the horizontal arms. Among the materials reused for the construction of this floor is a piece of Roman marble with a relief carving of a crested helmet.

Between the 8th and 11th centuries, the second floor was used by the nuns as an oratory, as shown by the presence of an altar (now lost) and depictions of religious figures on the walls. On the east wall are traces of depictions of velaria (Roman awnings), which is a rare subject. Above is the figure of Christ Pantocrator (with no beard), enthroned between two angels and originally close to figures of the Virgin Mary and some apostles. Presently only the figure of Saint John the Baptist can be made out, probably intended to form a Deesis with Mary, and perhaps Saint Peter. On the west wall, it is presumed that there were the figures of saints and martyrs (of whom only that of Saint Euphemia is now recognisable, thanks to a fragment of an inscription) and below them a procession of eight nuns, with their hands expressionistically depicted in attitudes of prayer. On the south wall are the remains of a fresco of the Virgin and Child, with a kneeling petitioner holding a candle. Finally, on the north wall are the remains of a painted lion's head, identified by some as that of Saint Mark, implying that this was once a depiction of the Tetramorph.

== Bibliography ==
- Pier Giuseppe Sironi, I Racconti di Torba, Tradate, Colombo, 1994.
- FAI, Monastero di Torba - Invito alla Visita, 2011.
- Angela Surace, Il Parco Archeologico di Castel Seprio, MIBAC, Soprintendenza Archeologica per la Lombardia, 2005.
