= Pamela H. Smith =

Historian of science

Pamela H. Smith is an American historian of science specializing in attitudes to nature in early modern Europe (1350–1700), with particular attention to craft knowledge and the role of craftspeople in the Scientific Revolution. She is the Seth Low Professor of History, founding director of the Making and Knowing Project, founding director of the Center for Science and Society, and chair of the Presidential Scholars in Society and Neuroscience, all at Columbia University. Smith served a two-year term (2016–2018) as president of the Renaissance Society of America.

Smith received a bachelor's degree from the University of Wollongong, New South Wales, Australia, in 1979 (First Class Honors), and a PhD from Johns Hopkins University, in 1991. Smith was the Margaret and Edwin F. Hahn Professor in the Social Sciences, and professor of history at Pomona College from 1990 to 2005 and the director of European Studies at Claremont Graduate University from 1996 to 2003.

== Awards and fellowships ==
- Smith was a fellow at Wissenschaftskolleg, the Institute of Advanced Study in Berlin in 1994–1995.
- In 1995, Smith received the Pfizer Award for her book The Business of Alchemy: Science and Culture in the Holy Roman Empire (1994).
- Smith was selected as a John S. Guggenheim Foundation fellow in 1997–1998.
- Smith won the Sidney M. Edelstein international fellowship for research in the history of chemistry in 1997–1998.
- Smith served as Getty Research Institute Scholar in 2000–2001.
- In 2003-2004 and 2009–2011, Smith was awarded a New Directions Fellowship by the Andrew Mellon Foundation.
- Her book, The Body of the Artisan: Art and Experience in the Scientific Revolution (2004) won the 2005 Leo Gershoy Prize awarded by the American Historical Association.
- Smith was a Samuel H. Kress Paired Fellow at the Center for Advanced Study in the Visual Arts at the National Gallery of Art in 2008.
- Smith was a Fellow at Princeton University's Davis Center for Historical Studies in 2009–2010.
- Smith was awarded the Joseph H. Hazen Education Prize by the History of Science Society in 2023.
- Smith was awarded the George Sarton Medal by the History of Science Society in 2025.

== Selected publications ==
=== Books ===
- From Lived Experience to the Written Word: Reconstructing Practical Knowledge in the Early Modern World, Chicago: University of Chicago Press, 2022.
- The Matter of Art: Materials, Practices, Cultural Logics, c. 1250-1750, co-edited with Christy Anderson, Anne Dunlop, Manchester University Press, 2015. ISBN 978-0-7190-9060-8
- Ways of Making and Knowing: The Material Culture of Empirical Knowledge, co-edited with Amy Meyers and Harold J. Cook, Bard Graduate Center/University of Michigan Press, 2014. ISBN 978-0-4721-1927-1. Second printing, 2017. ISBN 978-1-9417-9211-7
- Making Knowledge in Early Modern Europe: Practices, Objects, and Texts, 1400-1800 co-edited with Benjamin Schmidt, Chicago: University of Chicago Press, 2008. ISBN 978-0-2267-6329-3
- The Body of the Artisan: Art and Experience in the Scientific Revolution, Chicago: University of Chicago Press, 2004. ISBN 978-0-2267-6423-8
- Merchants and Marvels: Commerce, Science and Art in Early Modern Europe, co-edited with Paula Findlen, New York: Routledge, 2002. ISBN 978-0-4159-2816-8
- The Business of Alchemy: Science and Culture in the Holy Roman Empire, Princeton: Princeton University Press, 1994. Paperback edition, 1996; reprint paperback 2016.; reprint paperback 2016. ISBN 978-0-6911-7323-8 (paperback), ISBN 978-0-2267-6426-9 (ebook)
