= Giulia Maria Crespi =

Italian media proprietor (1923–2020)

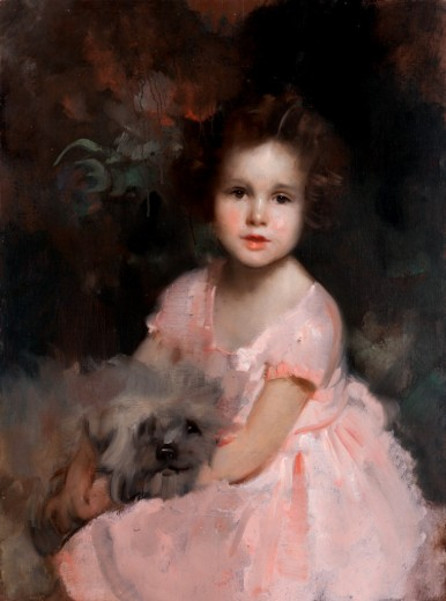
- Born: 6 June 1923; Merate
- Died: 19 July 2020 (aged 97); Milan
- Occupation: Media proprietor

Giulia Maria Crespi (6 June 1923 – 19 July 2020) was an Italian media proprietor. She was a non-profit executive and environmentalist, founder of Fondo Ambiente Italiano. She became Knight Grand Cross of the Order of Merit of the Italian Republic.

Crespi died in Milan on 19 July 2020, aged 97.
