= Kurt Weitzmann =

German-American art historian (1904–1993)

Kurt Weitzmann (March 7, 1904, Kleinalmerode, Witzenhausen – June 7, 1993, Princeton, New Jersey) was a German-born American art historian who was a leading figure in the study of Late Antique and Byzantine art in particular.

He attended the universities of Münster, Würzburg and Vienna before moving to Princeton in 1935, due to Nazi persecution. He is well known for the time he spent researching the icons and architecture at Saint Catherine's Monastery in Egypt. He was elected to the American Philosophical Society in 1964 and the American Academy of Arts and Sciences in 1978. He received the 1995 Lucky Strike Designer Award.

== Works ==
- Greek mythology in Byzantine art, 1951
- Geistige Grundlagen und Wesen der makedonischen Renaissance, 1963
- Illustration roll and codex, 1947, ^{2}1970
- "Studies in manuscript illumination" series
- The Joshua Roll, 1948
- The Fresco Cycle of S. Maria di Castelseprio, 1952
- Ancient book illumination, 1959
- Late Antique and Early Christian Book Illumination, 1970
- The Monastery of St. Catherine at Mount Sinai, The Icons, I. 1976
- Studies in classical and Byzantine manuscript illumination, 1971
- Byzantine book illumination and ivories, 1980
- Byzantine liturgical Psalters and Gospels, 1980
- (with H. L. Kessler) The Frescoes of the Dura Synagogue and Christian Art, 1990

== See also ==
- Paris Psalter
- Castelseprio
- Adolph Goldschmidt
