= Avio, Trentino =

Avio
- Comune
- Comune di Avio
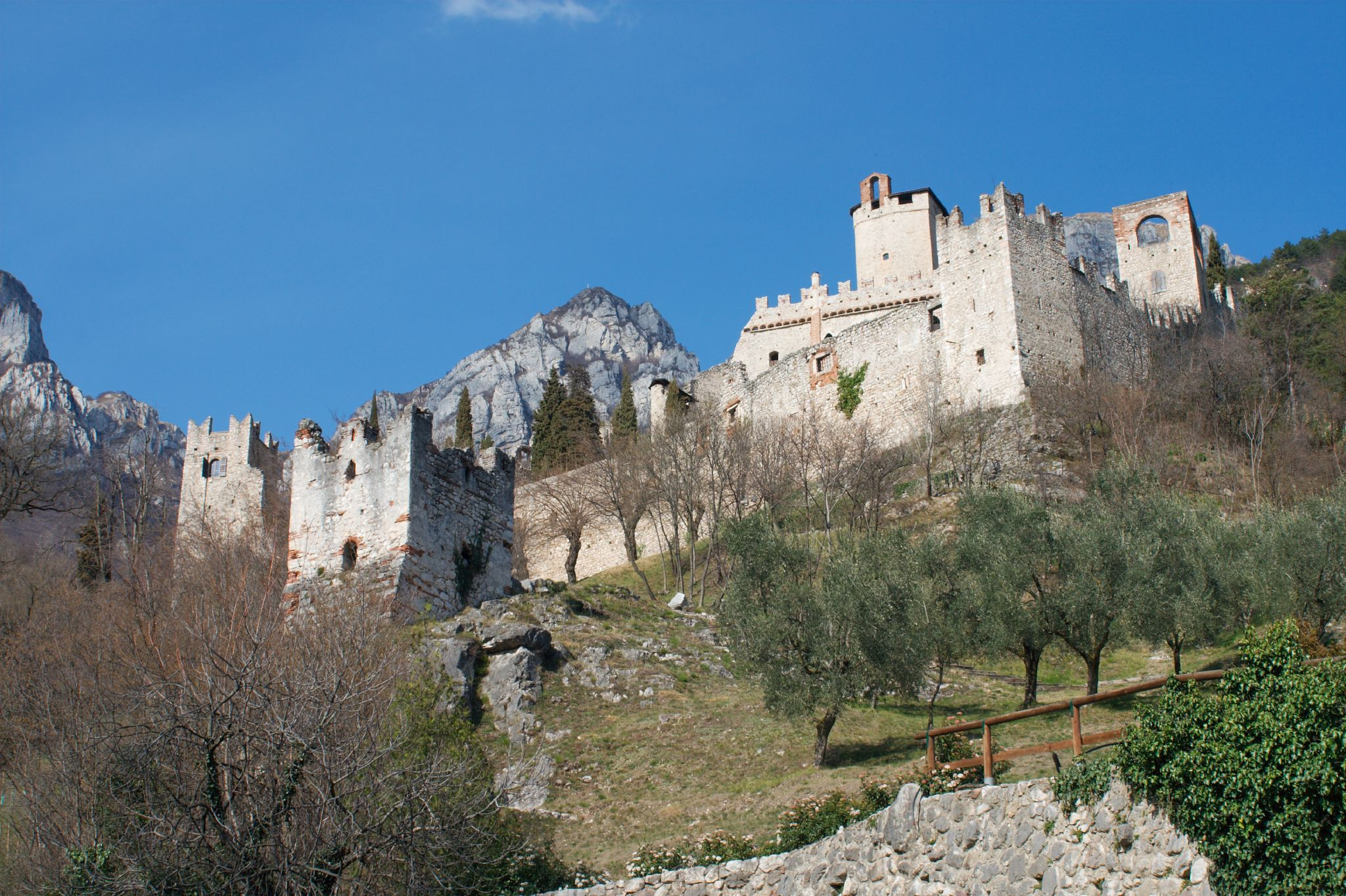
- The Castle of Avio (Sabbionara)

- Coat of arms

- Location within Italy Location within Trentino-Alto Adige/Südtirol
- Coordinates: 45°44′N 10°57′E
- Country: Italy
- Region: Trentino-Alto Adige/Südtirol
- Province: Trentino (TN)
- Frazioni: Borghetto, Mama, Masi, Sabbionara, Vò Destro, Vò Sinistro

Government
  - Mayor: Ivano Fracchetti

Area
  - Total: 68 km^{2} (26 sq mi)
- Elevation: 131 m (430 ft)

Population (2026)
  - Total: 4,118
  - Density: 61/km^{2} (160/sq mi)
- Demonym: Aviensi
- Time zone: UTC+1 (CET)
  - Summer (DST): UTC+2 (CEST)
- Postal code: 38063
- Dialing code: 0464
- Patron saint: Madonna Assunta
- Saint day: 15 August
- Website: Official website

Avio is a comune in Trentino in north Italy. It is about 50 kilometres (31 mi) from Trento, in the Vallagarina, and is crossed by the Adige river. Avio occupies a flat plain, bounded by the Monte Baldo on the east and by the Monti Lessini on the west.

== Main sights ==
- Castle of Avio
- Pieve of Avio
- Parish church of Santa Maria Assunta, housing a 17th-century stucco decoration by Giovanni Angelo Sala and the Via Crucis by Ignazio Paluselli.

== Economy ==
The area of Avio is especially renowned for the production of wine, such as the autochthonous Enantio.
