= Anne Dunlop =

Canadian art historian

Anne Dunlop FAHA

Academic background
- Education: Queen's University at Kingston; University of British Columbia
- Alma mater: University of Warwick
- Thesis: Advocata nostra: Central Italian paintings of Mary as the Second Eve, c.1335–c.1445 (1997)

Anne Elizabeth Dunlop FAHA is a Canadian-born art historian. As of 2022 she is Herald Chair of Fine Art at the University of Melbourne.

== Education ==
Dunlop graduated with a BA from Queen's University at Kingston in Canada. She next completed an MA at the University of British Columbia. She moved to the University of Warwick in Coventry, England where she gained her PhD with a thesis titled "Advocata nostra: Central Italian paintings of Mary as the Second Eve, c.1335–c.1445".

== Career ==
In 2009–2010 Dunlop held a Hanna Kiel Fellowship at Villa I Tatti in Florence. While at Tulane University in 2012–2013, she was a Samuel H. Kress senior fellow, focusing her research on "Castagno's Crime: Andrea del Castagno and Quattrocento Painting", in preparation for publication of Andrea del Castagno and the Limits of Painting in 2015. From August to December 2016 she was Robert Lehman visiting professor at Villa I Tatti, where she conducted a survey of "The Golden Renaissance".

Dunlop was elected a Fellow of the Australian Academy of the Humanities in 2019. In the same year she was appointed to the advisory board of Melbourne University Publishing in the field of art history.

In 2015 Dunlop was named Herald Chair of Fine Arts by the University of Melbourne. She serves as an Australian national delegate to the International Congress of the History of Art.

== Selected publications ==
- Bourdua, Louise; Dunlop, Anne, eds. (2007), Art and the Augustinian order in early Renaissance Italy, Ashgate, ISBN 978-1-315-26214-7
- Dunlop, Anne (2009), Painted palaces: The rise of secular art in early Renaissance Italy, Pennsylvania State University Press, ISBN 978-0-271-03408-9
- Dunlop, Anne (2015), Andrea del Castagno and the limits of painting, Harvey Miller Publishers, ISBN 978-1-909400-18-4
- Anderson, Christy; Dunlop, Anne; Smith, Pamela H., eds. (31 December 2014), The matter of art: Materials, practices, cultural logics, c.1250-1750, Manchester University Press (published 2015), ISBN 978-0-7190-9060-8
- Dunlop, Anne, ed. (2018), Antipodean early modern: European art in Australian collections, c. 1200–1600, Amsterdam University Press, ISBN 978-90-485-3623-8
