= Castelseprio (archaeological park) =

Archaeological park in Lombardy

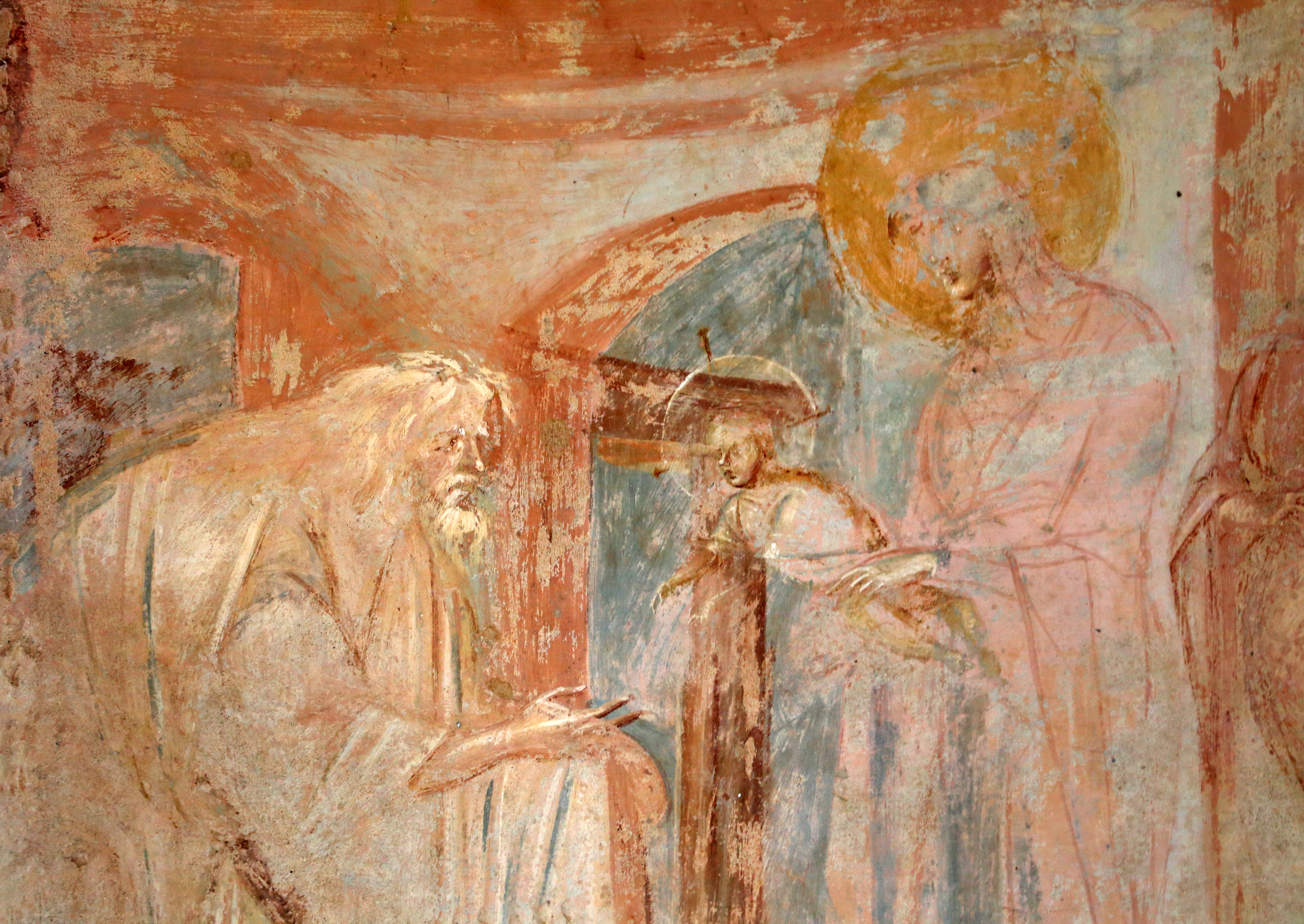
Fresco of Presentation of Jesus in the Temple in the church

Castelseprio was the site of a Roman fort in antiquity, and a significant Lombard town in the early Middle Ages, before being destroyed and abandoned in 1287. It is today preserved as an archaeological park in the modern comune of Castelseprio, near the modern village of the same name. It is in the north of Italy, in the Province of Varese, about 50 km northwest of Milan.

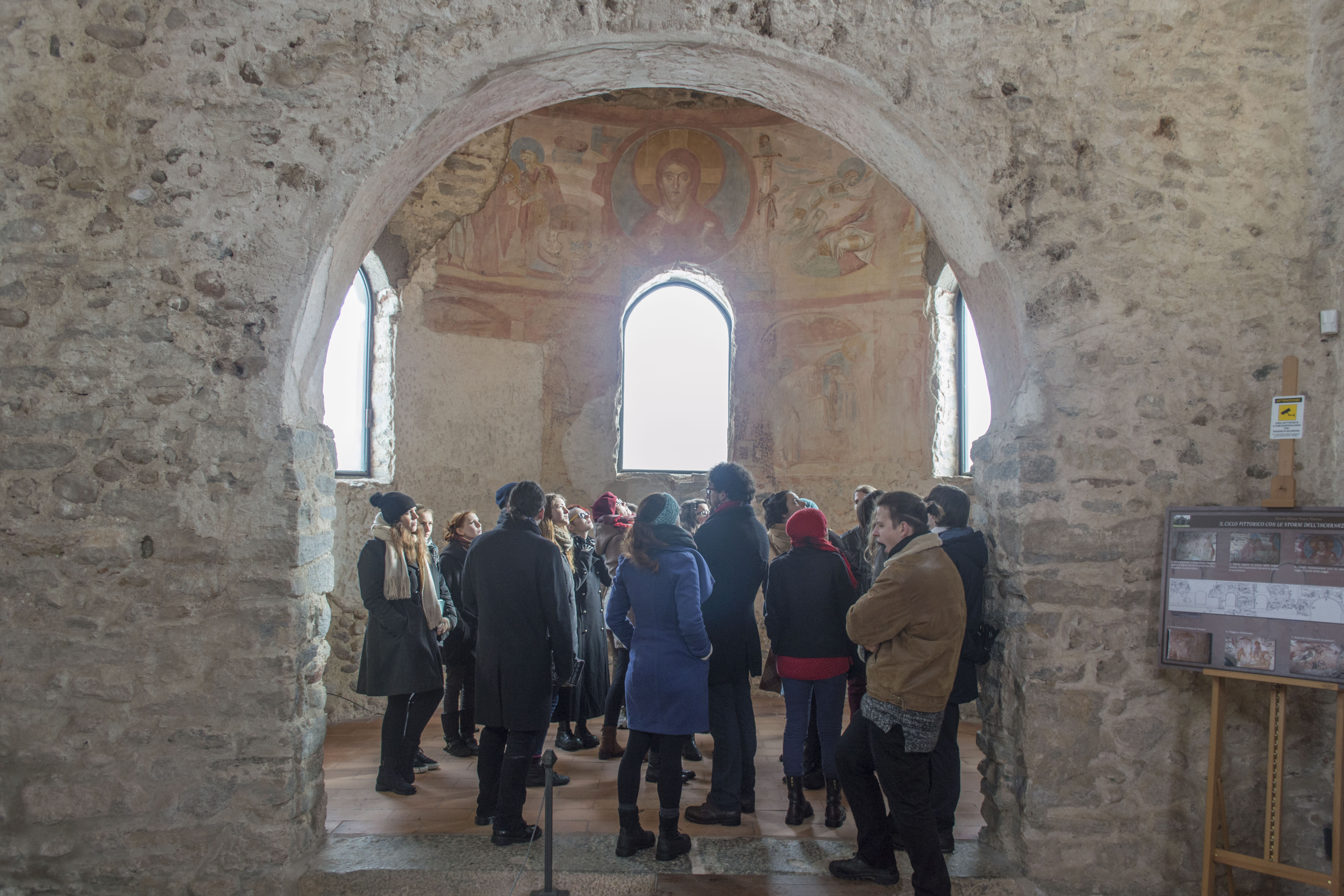
Visitors in the apse, 2017

The fame of Castelseprio lies in the Early Medieval frescoes contained in the apse of the small Church of Santa Maria foris portas, which were only rediscovered in 1944. These frescoes are of exceptional rarity and artistic significance, and show strong Byzantine influence. The dating of the frescoes and the origin of their painter or painters remain controversial, although the first half of the 9th century seems to be emerging as the most likely date.

In 2011, the church - and the castrum with the Torba Tower - became a UNESCO World Heritage Site as part of a group of seven inscribed as Longobards in Italy, Places of Power (568-774 A.D.). In 2006, the Italian Ministry of Culture in a submission to UNESCO, said:

The frescoes decorating the central apse of the church of Santa Maria foris portas constitute the finest early medieval pictorial cycle in terms of artistic quality, and are considered unique in early medieval European art.

== History ==
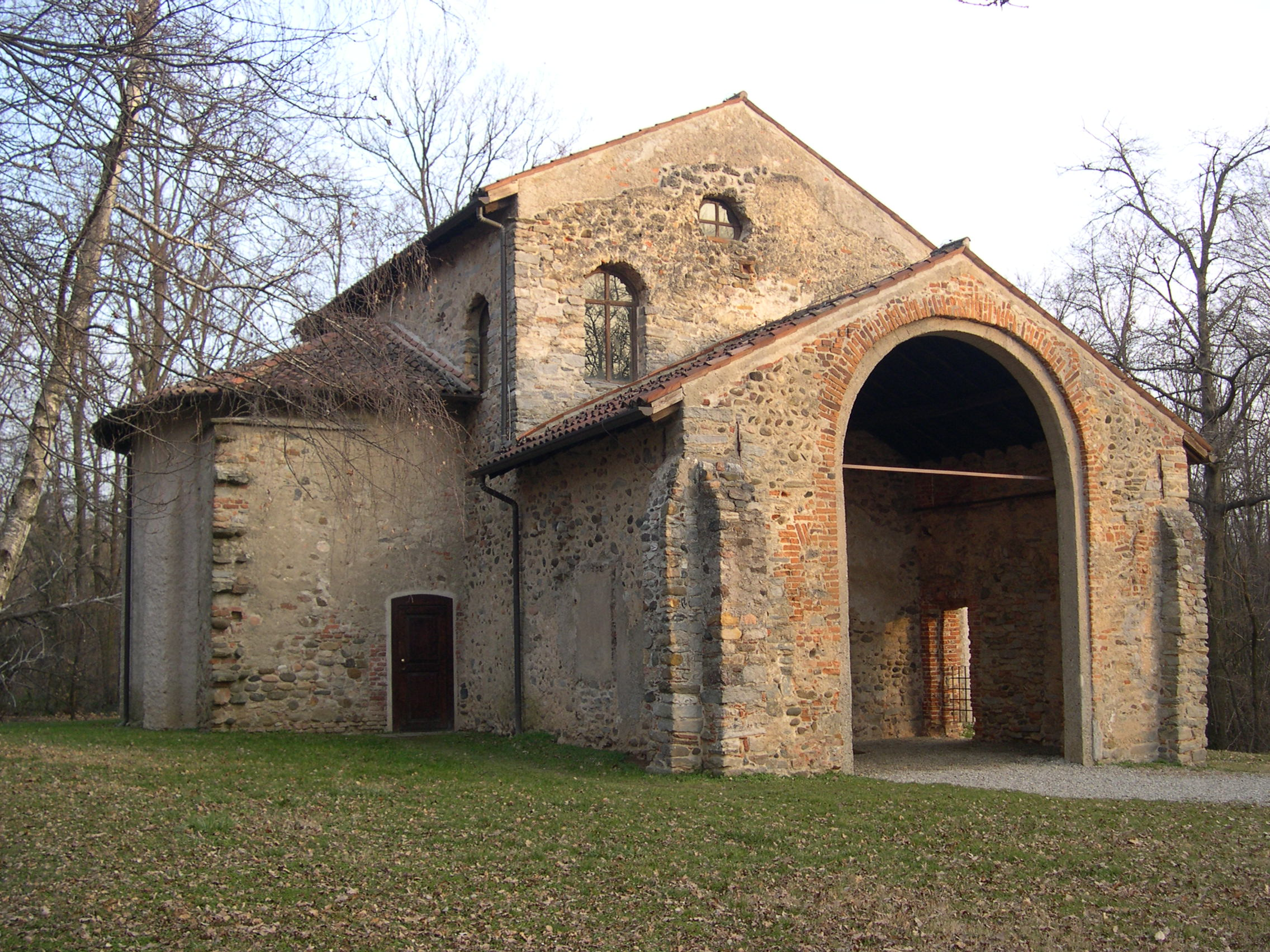
Church of Santa Maria foris portas

Castelseprio originated as a Roman fort that commanded an important crossroad. During the early Middle Ages, the Lombards occupied the Roman fort, turning it into a fortified citadel or small town. At one point coins were minted there - a sign of its importance. The Church of Santa Maria foris portas ("foris portas" meaning "outside the gates" in Latin) which contains the famous frescoes, lay just outside the walls of the citadel. The early dedication of the church to Mary is an assumption; the first documented mention of a church dedicated to Mary in Castelseprio (which is assumed to be this one) comes from the 13th century.

The whole citadel was completely destroyed by Ottone Visconti, Archbishop of Milan, after he captured it in 1287, to prevent it being used again by his rivals. Investigations into the church, which began in 1934, finally uncovered the famous Byzantinesque frescoes below later plaster in 1944.

The whole area is now an archaeological zone containing the remains of the walls and of the much larger three-aisled 5th-century Basilica of San Giovanni Evangelista. There is also a baptistry of the 5th to 7th centuries dedicated to St. John the Baptist. This has two fonts, perhaps for the use of different Rites, and is octagonal with a small apse to the east. A third Church of San Paolo has a central hexagonal plan and was built between the 6th and 12th centuries. There are some ruins left from the castle. Nearby is a large tower, once used as a convent.

== Frescoes ==
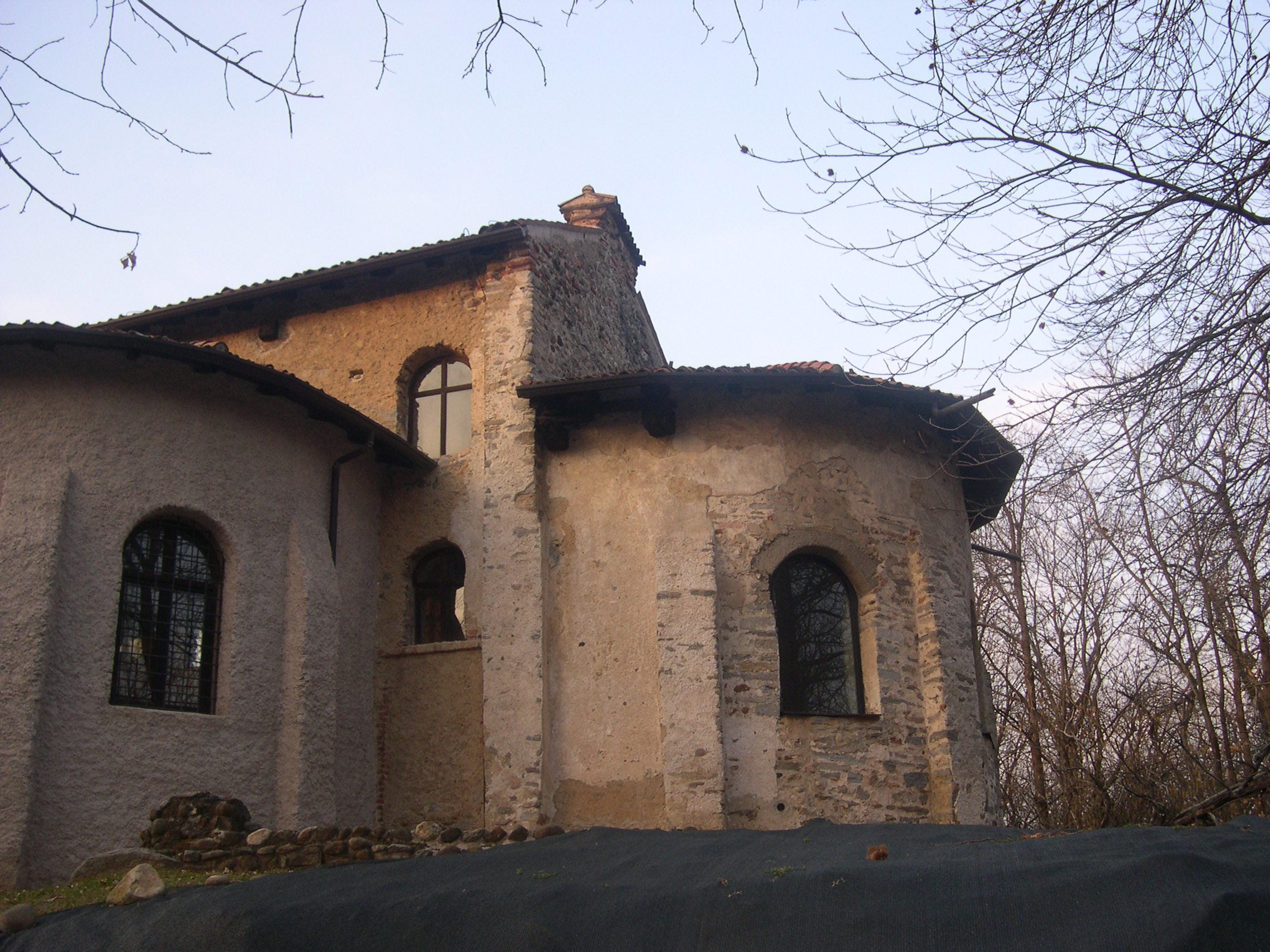
The rear of the church, with the apse.

When the Church of Santa Maria foris portas was investigated in 1944, it was found to contain, as well as later frescoes, a highly important and sophisticated cycle of fresco paintings showing very strong Byzantine influence.

=== Style ===
It is thought by some scholars, including Leveto, that two different hands can be detected, but the origins of these artists are uncertain and subject to speculation. The frescoes are sophisticated, expressive and confident. The artists adapt traditional compositional types to the particular site without strain or disproportion. Poses are natural and rhythmic, and the whole has "a great ardor and conviction, an intense response to the human meaning of the subject" (Schapiro). While some aspects of the frescoes, notably the iconography, are clearly Byzantine, others may draw on the Christian art of Syria or Egypt.

The frescoes also have significant aspects which relate most closely to the late antique art of Italy. Several of the buildings are successfully foreshortened, and the relationship between buildings and figures is more effectively managed than in most Byzantine painting. The painting is done with unusual freedom compared to most Byzantine work; it is this feature in particular which relates to much earlier works from the late antiquity such as paintings found in the catacombs of Rome.

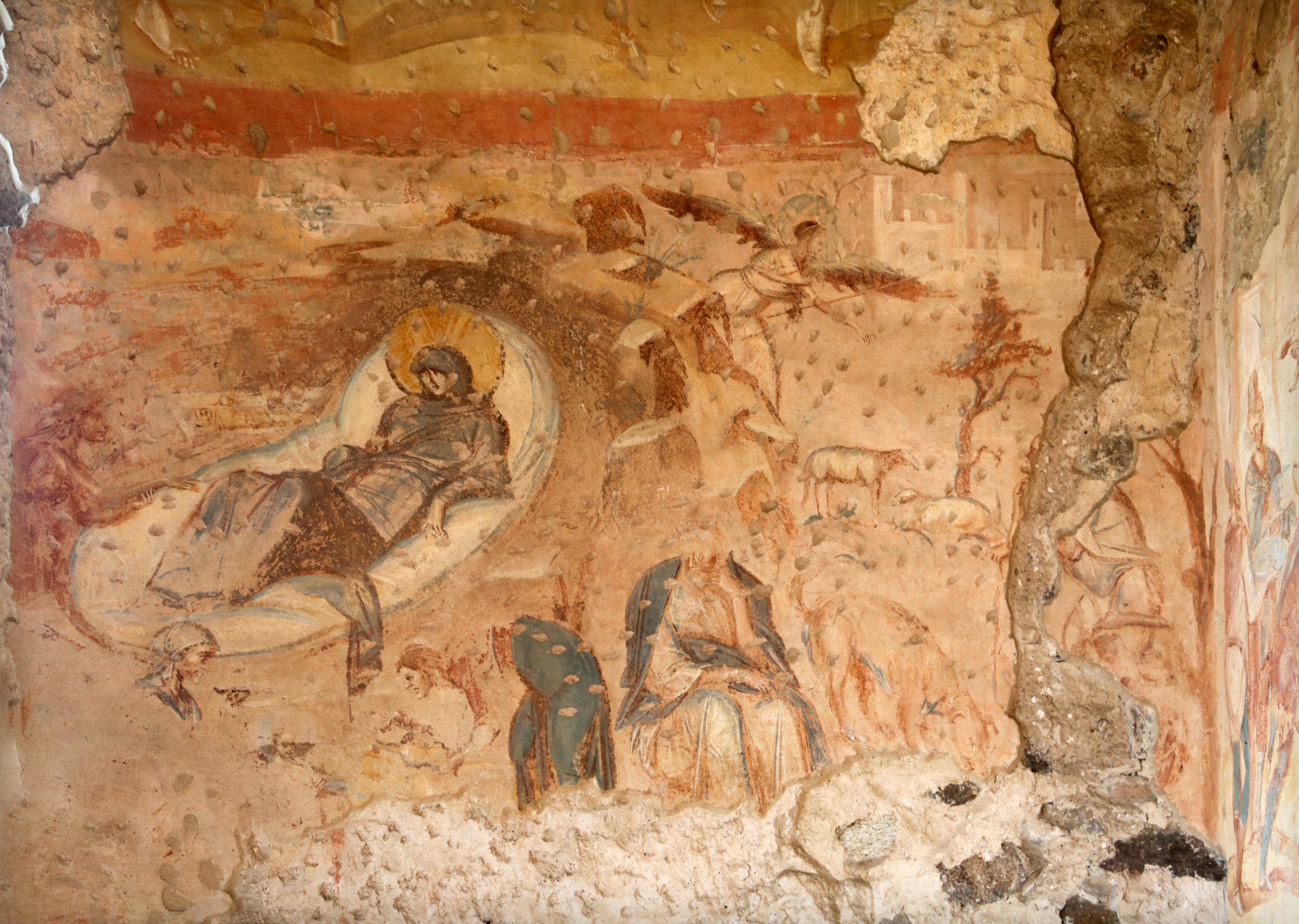
The Nativity scene

Some art historians see the style as coming from the tradition of Alexandria, from which no other painting on a similar scale remains. John Beckwith is somewhat less enthusiastic than some art historians, describing the frescos as "wholly competent" and worthy of comparison with 7th century works in Rome He believed the "drapery folds ... a complex series of angular ridges emphasized by highlights ... make a decidedly metallic impression, and betray the copyist, who foreshadows in a disturbing way tenth-century mannerisms".

=== Subjects ===
The Byzantinesque frescoes are located around the curved wall of the apse, and the inward surface of the arch between the apse and the main body of the church. The condition of the frescoes is variable; some parts are well-preserved whilst others are missing completely, or barely visible. Much of the painted area has been pitted to provide a key for the subsequent plastering-over (see the lower area in the middle of the Presentation scene).

The subjects of the missing or fragmentary scenes are a matter of some scholarly controversy with some writers proposing that these scenes made up a cycle on the Life of the Virgin, and others one on the Life of Christ; these views are described below.

The frescoes are in three registers, the middle register being interrupted by three arched windows. They represent a cycle of the Nativity of Christ and may also have represented early aspects of the Life of Mary, or of Christ. The lowest register has a decorative frieze below which there are a few remains in the centre showing painted curtain railings and religious symbols. This register may not have contained figures. The upper and middle registers contain narrative paintings. The cycle may have been part of a larger scheme of decoration which once included the outer face of the arch and the other walls of the church.

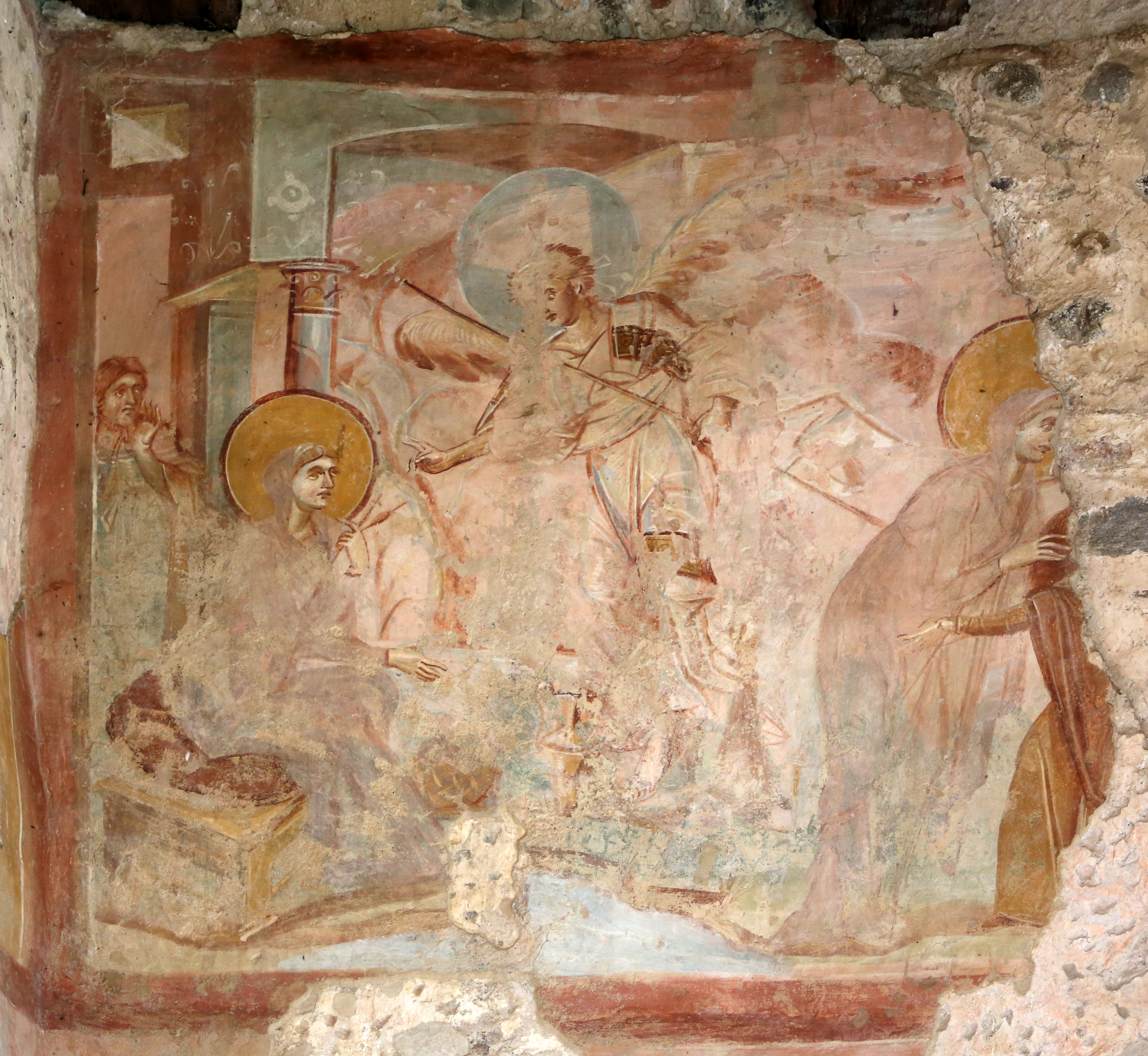
Annunciation and incomplete Visitation.

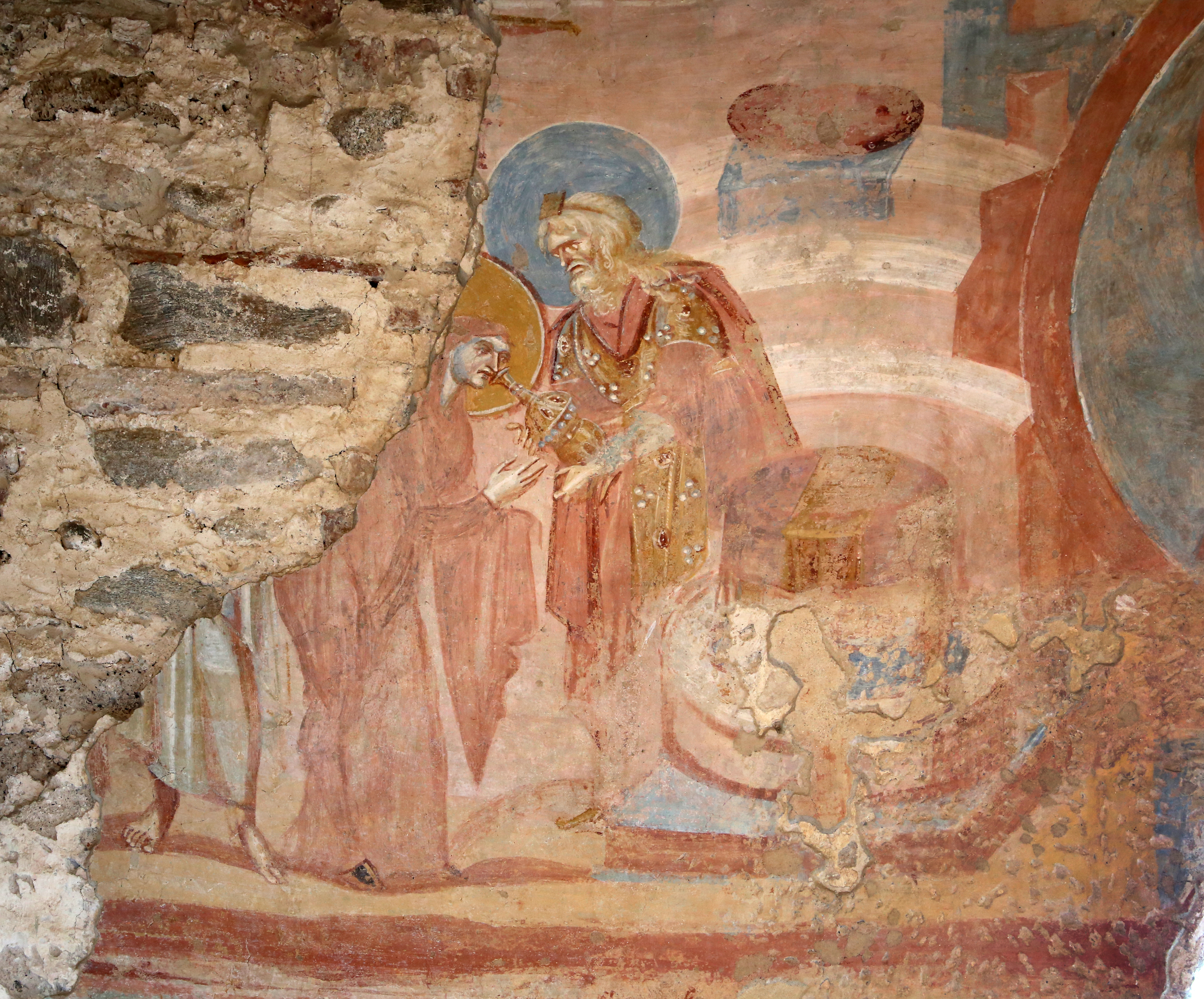
Trial by Bitter Water, a rare subject.

Upper register of narratives:

- 1) Over the main arch, on the side inward to the apse, rather than in the body of the church, is a Hetoimasia, or Throne of God with symbols on it, in a roundel, with an archangel on either side, flying in a "victory" pose.

Then, on the curved wall of the apse, reading left to right:

- 2) Annunciation and Visitation - right side incomplete
- missing roundel, which possibly contained the bust of Mary
- 3) Trial by Bitter Water - left side incomplete
- 4) Bust of Christ Pantocrator, in a roundel over central window of the eastern apse. Below the window in the lowest register are traces of a painted exedra containing a Gospel book on a cushion.
- 5) Dream of Saint Joseph
- missing roundel, which possibly contained the bust of John the Baptist.
- 6) Journey to Bethlehem - incomplete on the right

Middle Register On the curved wall, reading from right to left :

- 7) Nativity, and Annunciation to the shepherds
- 8) Presentation of Jesus at the Temple

Fragmentary remains of two frescoes which may have been:

- 9) The Flight into Egypt. or (in the Marian interpretation) The Birth of the Virgin)
- 10) The Massacre of the Innocents or (in the Marian interpretation) The Presentation of the Virgin at the Temple)

On the two inner faces of the apsidal arch :

- 11) Adoration of the Magi, on the inner face of the right side of the arch.
- 12) on the inner face of the left side of the arch - remnants perhaps from The Dream of the Magi or (in the Marian interpretation) the Rejection of Joachim's Offerings at the Temple)

Chronological sequence The alternative chronological sequences of the ten narrative scenes would run as follows:

- Nativity of Christ: 2,5,3,6,7,8,11,12,9,10
- Life of Mary: 12,9,10,2,5,3,6,7,8,11

In the Marian version the three missing scenes come at the start of the story, rather than the end. Neither sequence follows a consistent chronological sequence on the wall. Joseph's (first) dream and the trial by bitter water come chronologically between the Annunciation and the Visitation. The Presentation of Jesus in the Temple should, according to Leviticus have happened on the fortieth day after the birth. The timing of the visit of Magi is not mentioned in the Gospels, and apocryphal writings placed it between seven days and two years after the Nativity. The Eastern church, and by the Gothic period the Western church also, at least in art, placed it very soon after the birth, so that the Magi, like the shepherds, are included in Nativity scenes themselves. At this date, however, the Western church tended to place the arrival of the Magi later, though certainly before the Flight to Egypt and the Massacre of the Innocents. Some departure from chronology to enable thematic or typological connections to be emphasised is a common feature of medieval picture cycles.

==== The Marian interpretation ====
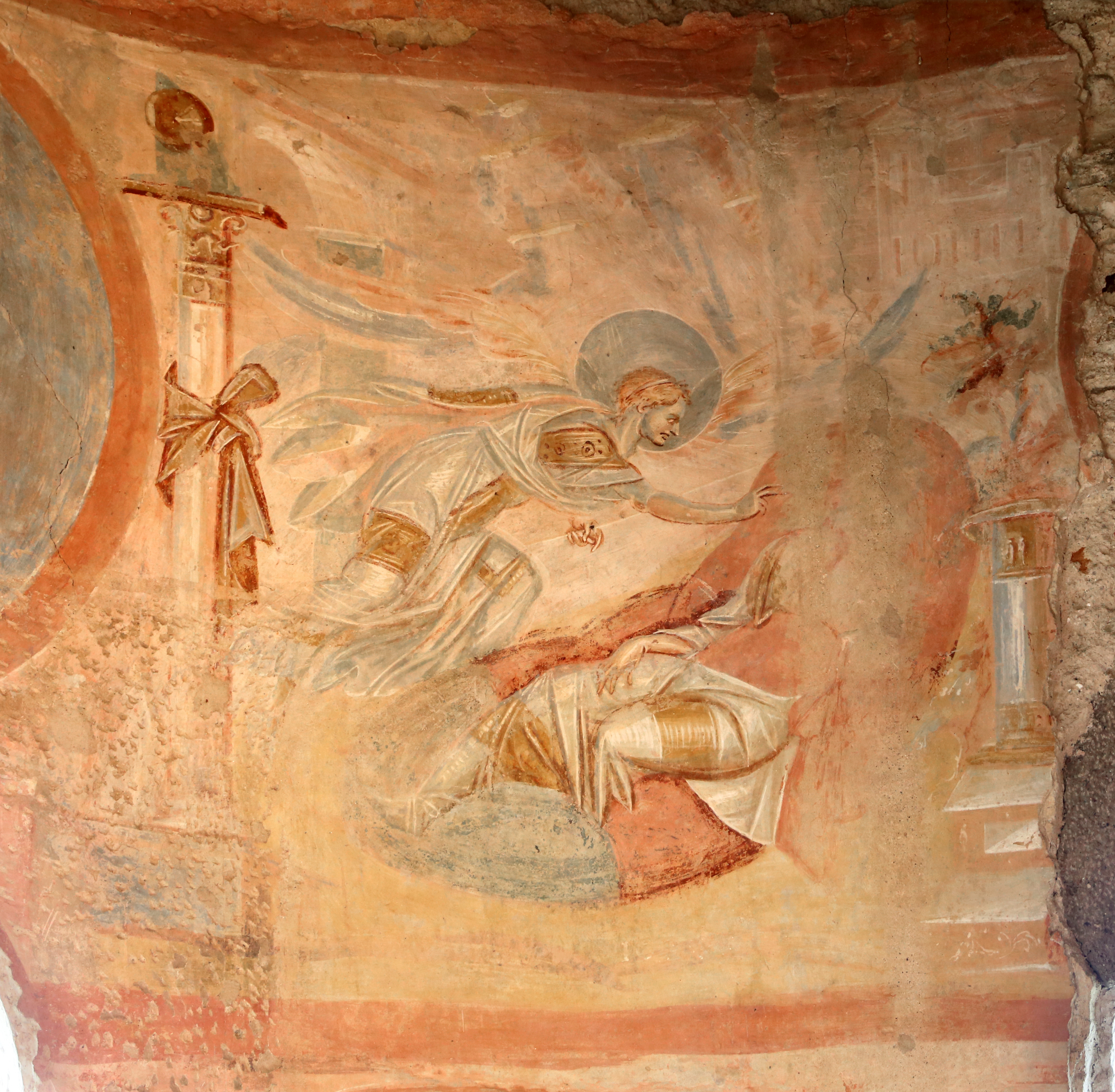
Joseph's Dream scene

Some scholars, notably P.D. Leveto, interpret the cycle as being "Marian", that is, part of the Life of Mary, rather than specifically representing those scenes associated with the Nativity. Evidence for this interpretation is the presence of the rarely depicted scene of the "Trial by Bitter Water". With this interpretation, the three missing narrative scenes would have had a different content, and the sequence itself would be differently ordered, moving from the left-hand side of the arch to the first two scenes of the lower register, through the top register and then to lower right-hand scenes and finishing with the Magi scene on the opposite side of the arch. In this proposed arrangement, the two scenes of the Birth and Presentation at the Temple of Mary are visually balanced with each other, whilst the Presentation and the Trial by water above it are concerned with Mary's virginity. Also balanced are the two scenes of offerings on either side of the arch wall; in both cases the figures are placed to make their offerings away from the empty arched space, to keep the visual attention focused within the apse.

=== Dating ===
In 1950, soon after the frescoes were first discovered, a poll of the scholars who attended a conference in Castelseprio showed a rough split between dates in the 7th and 10th century, although the extreme range of dates that have been suggested stretches from the 6th to the 14th century - an almost unprecedented range in medieval art history.

Since that time, the range of possible dates has narrowed significantly. Radio-carbon dating of timber and thermoluminescent dating of roof tiles suggest that the church was built in the early to mid-ninth century. While providing a reasonably sound date for the church structure, this can only be "terminus post quem" for the frescoes, which may have been added later. However, the rough finish on the interior stonework leads many scholars to believe that the frescoes were added as part of the original building programme.

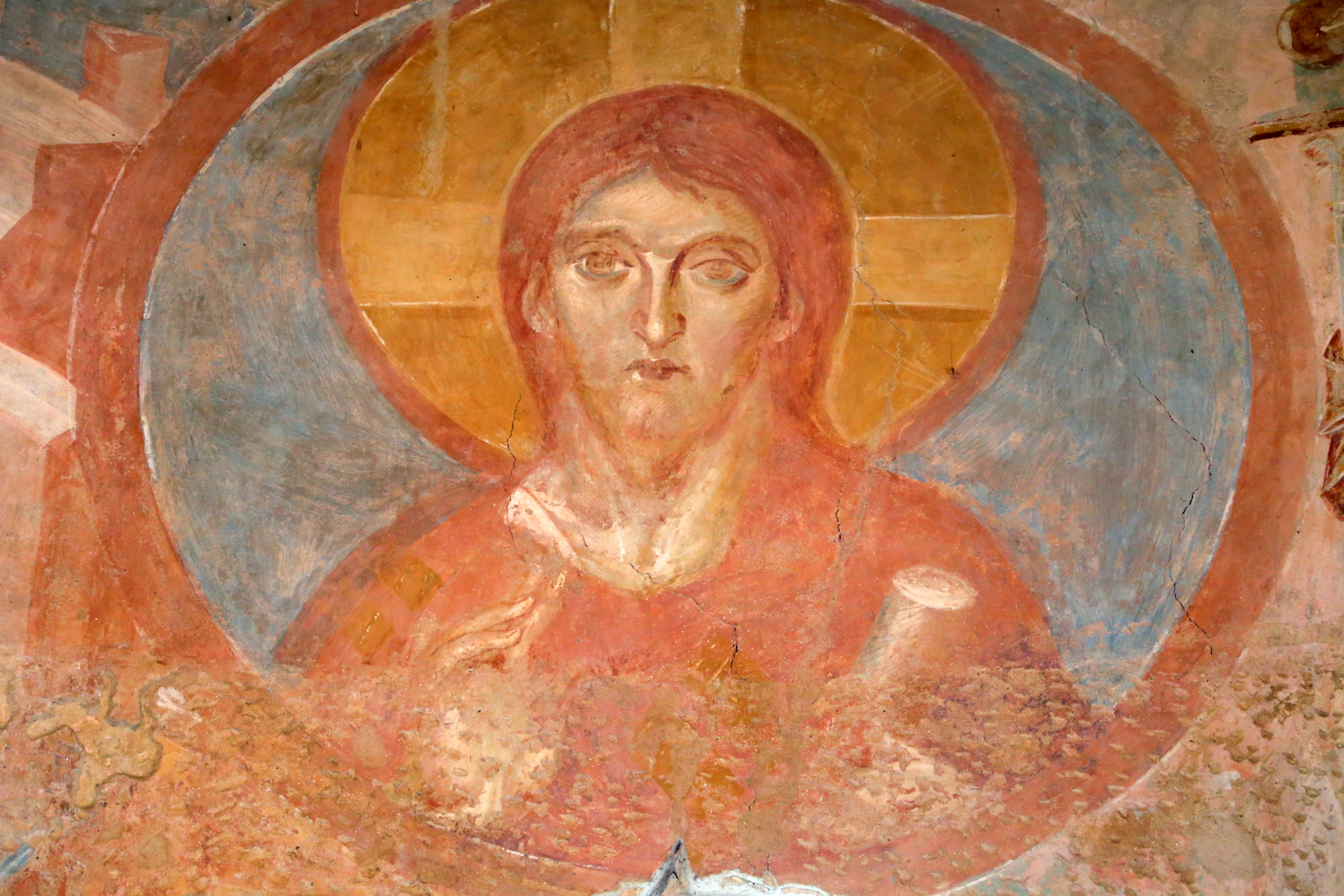
Bust of Christ.

A "terminus ante quem" was provided by the discovery of graffiti scratched into the fresco plaster recording a number of clerical appointments, the earliest of which is dated (by the name of the presiding Archbishop of Milan) to 948 at the latest. Many writers feel that a certain interval must have elapsed after the painting of the cycle before the clergy would have treated the paintings in this way.

Many art historians have pointed to a relationship between the frescoes and two closely related manuscripts, namely the Joshua Roll (Vatican Library, Ms palatine gr. 431) and the Paris Psalter (Bibliothèque nationale de France Ms Grec. 139) . However, the dating of both manuscripts is likewise controversial. The art historians Kurt Weitzmann and Meyer Schapiro agreed that the artistic quality of the frescoes is superior to that of either manuscript.

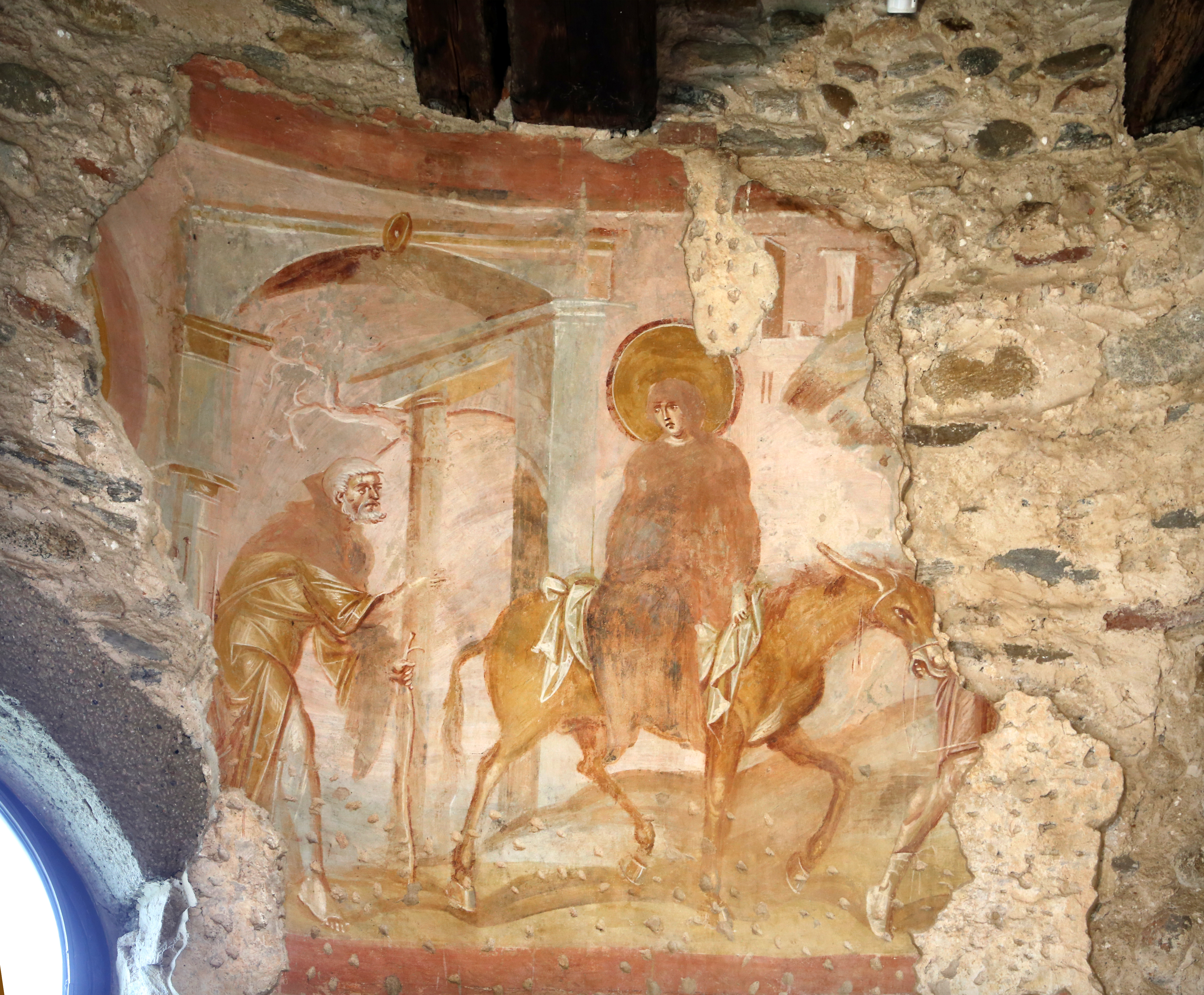
The Journey to Bethlehem, a scene that in most cycles had already turned into the Flight to Egypt.

Kurt Weitzmann preferred a date shortly before 945, and postulated a connection with a marriage between a Lombard princess and a Byzantine prince, which took place in 944. He favoured as the artist an unknown Constantinopolitan artist, trained in the same workshop as the artists of the two manuscripts, on a visit in connection with the marriage. Schapiro preferred a date between the 7th and 9th centuries, in 1957 settling on the 8th century.

Most recent writers, relying on the analysis of the timber and roof tiles mentioned above, prefer the first half of the 9th century. Some writers believe the work may have been done by Greek refugees long settled in Italy, or by Italians trained by such artists. Others believe that artists fresh from the Byzantine world were responsible.

=== Aspects of the works ===
Almost every aspect of the frescoes, from the clothing to the treatment of the nimbus or halo around the infant Christ, has been analysed and compared to other works in great detail. Some examples are:

- The inscriptions naming various figures are in Latin, and in Roman script, but the midwife at the Nativity is named as "EMEA", the "E" ("H" in the Greek alphabet) being a form of the Greek for "the". In the Byzantine period it is common to find Greek inscriptions naming figures in paintings which include the definite article. The Greek form of the inscription would be: "H MAIA".
- The treatment of the architectural elements within the paintings has been compared to Hellenizing work produced for Moslem patrons in the 8th century, at the Great Mosque in Damascus and elsewhere.
- The legend of the doubting midwife, whose withered arm is miraculously cured, shown in the Nativity scene, probably appears only in art from the West during this period.
- The Ordeal of the bitter water is otherwise extremely rare in Western iconography, and this is one of the latest of the few Byzantine depictions. The legend comes from the apocryphal Protoevangelium of James and occurs, in the fully developed story, after the Dream of Joseph, in which an angel reassures Joseph who is disturbed to discover Mary's pregnancy, since he knows he has not slept with her. In the legend, others also notice the pregnancy and to dispel gossip and accusations, the priests of the Temple (where Mary had formerly been a temple maid) make the couple undergo the trial of drinking "bitter water" — their reaction to which will prove or disprove their innocence. Naturally they pass. The idea of the trial is clearly based on Numbers 5, 11 ff. The legend was part of some Western medieval religious dramas, in which the "detractors" then drank the water, with horrible results. An example is the N-town Pageant series manuscript in the British Library, London (BL MS Cotton Vespasian D.8), which is mid-15th century from the East Midlands of England.
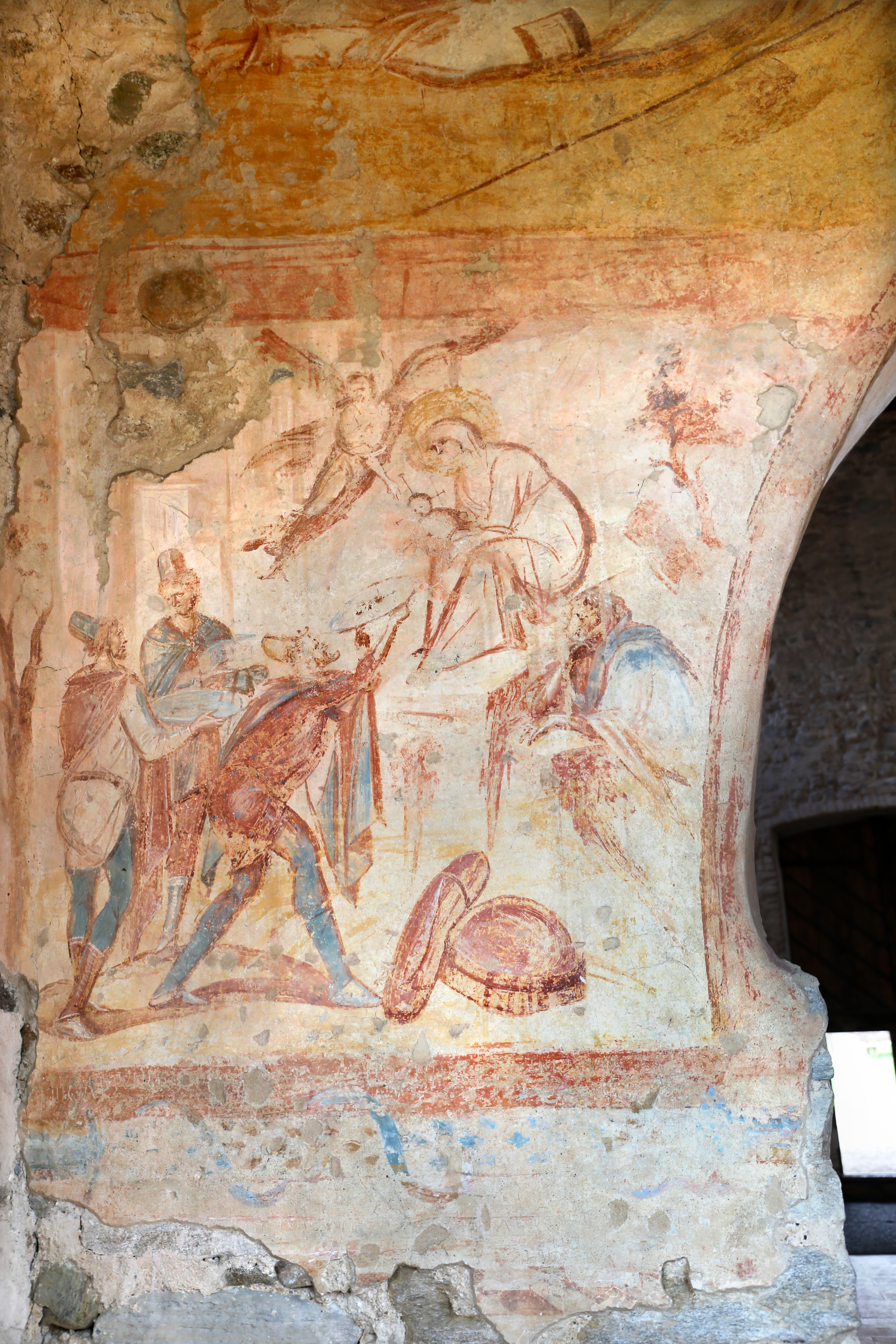
Adoration of the Magi

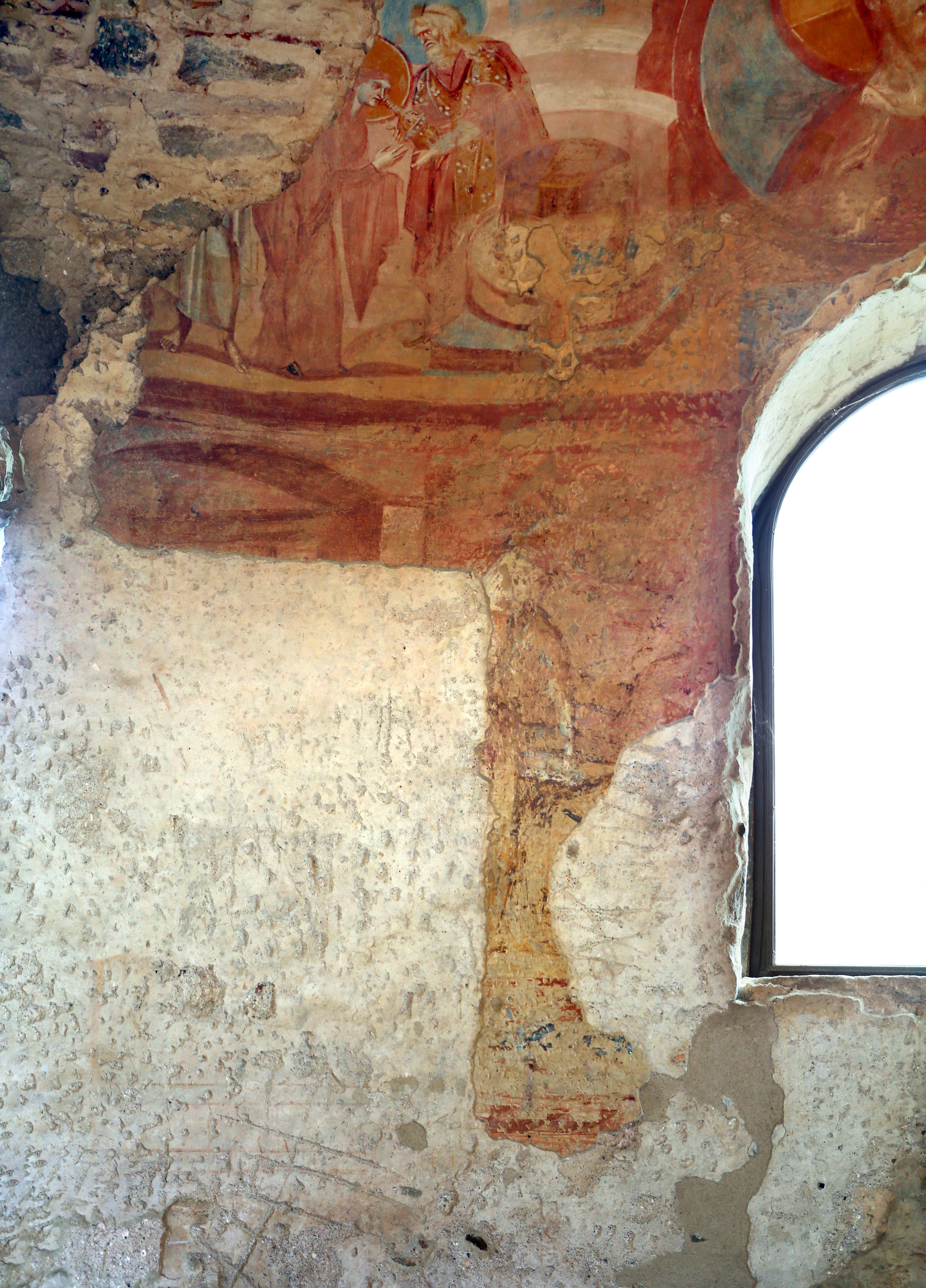
Uncertain scene, below the trial

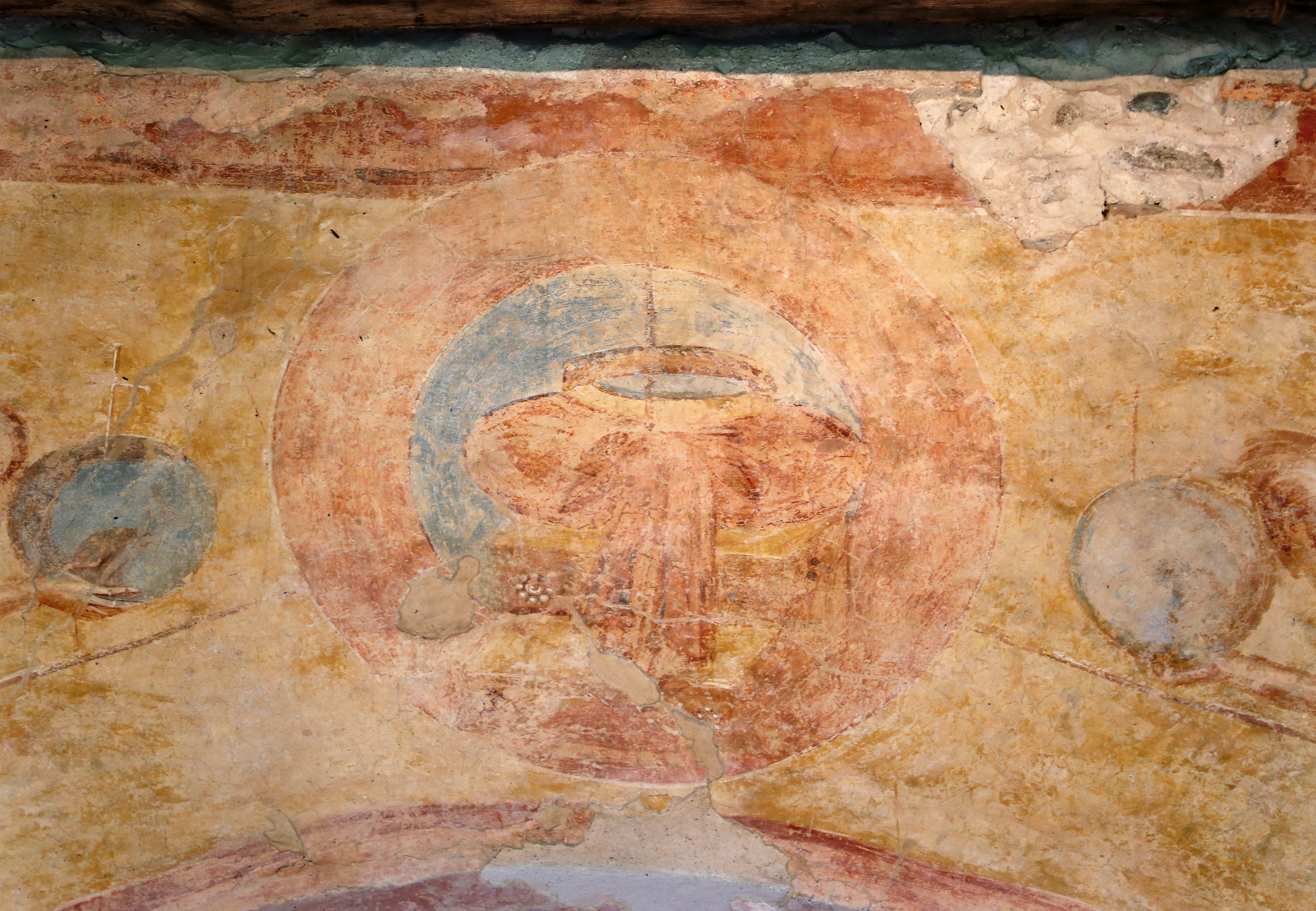
Hetoimasia

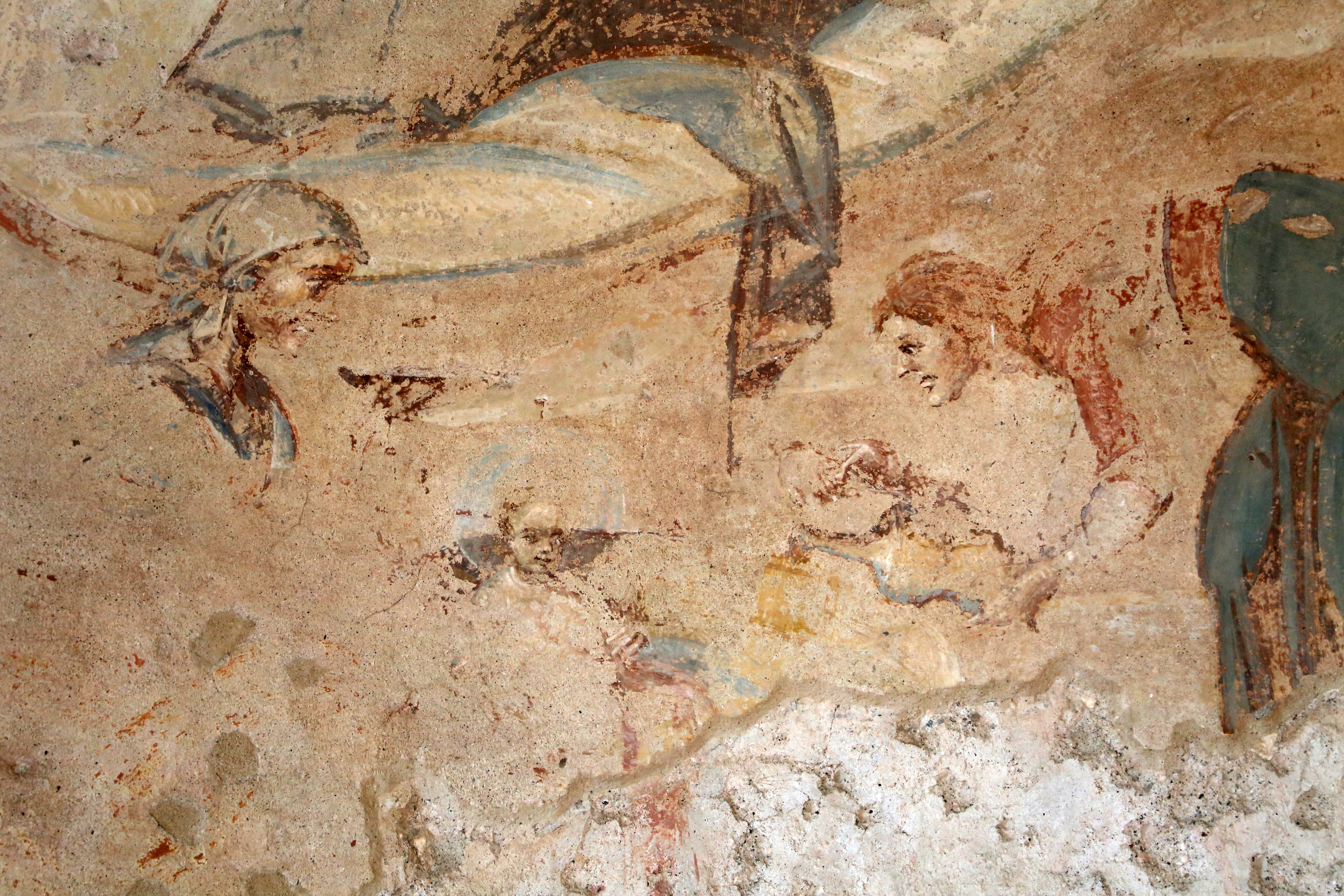
Detail of the Nativity, the two midwives bathing Jesus

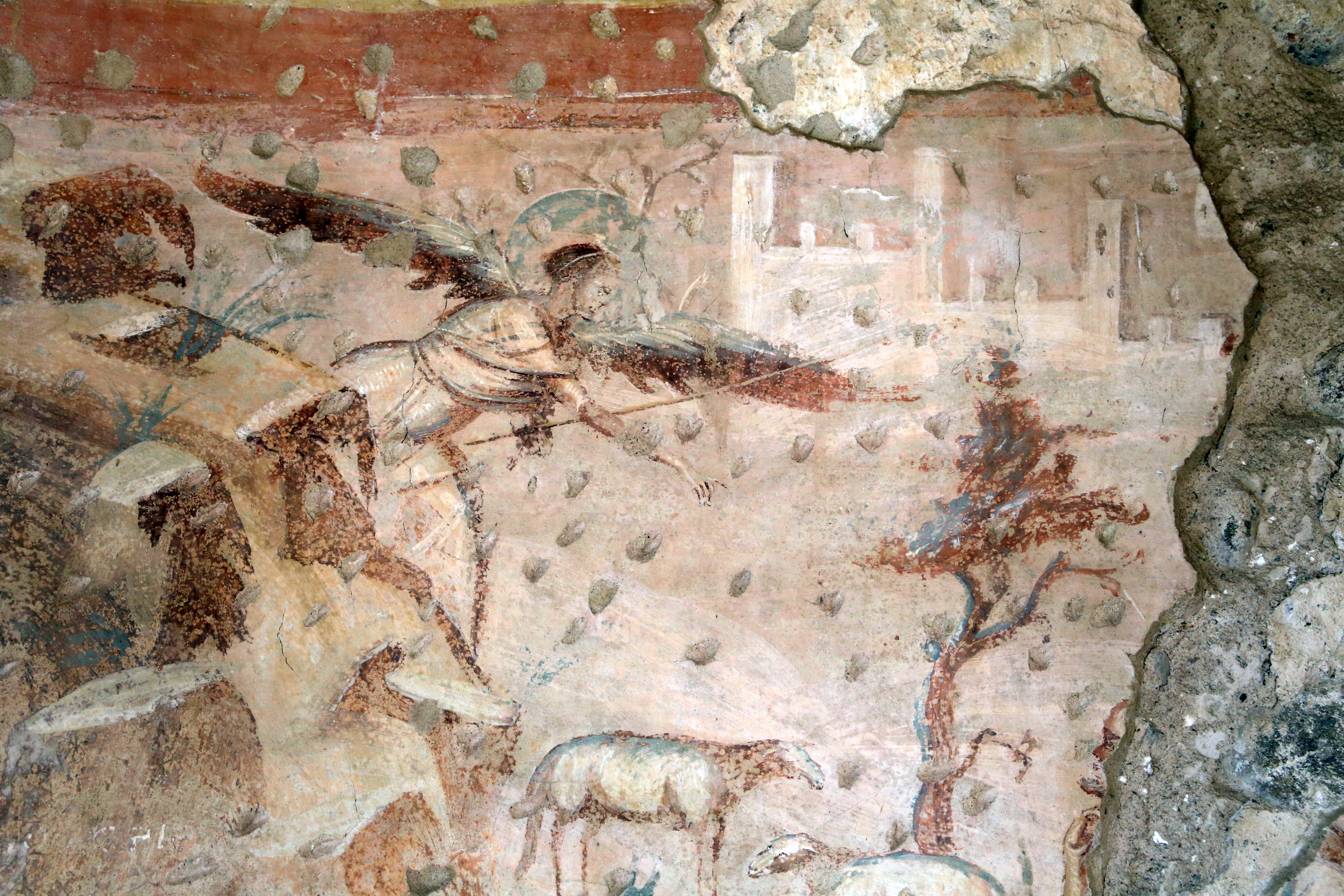
Detail of the Nativity, the Annunciation to the Shepherds

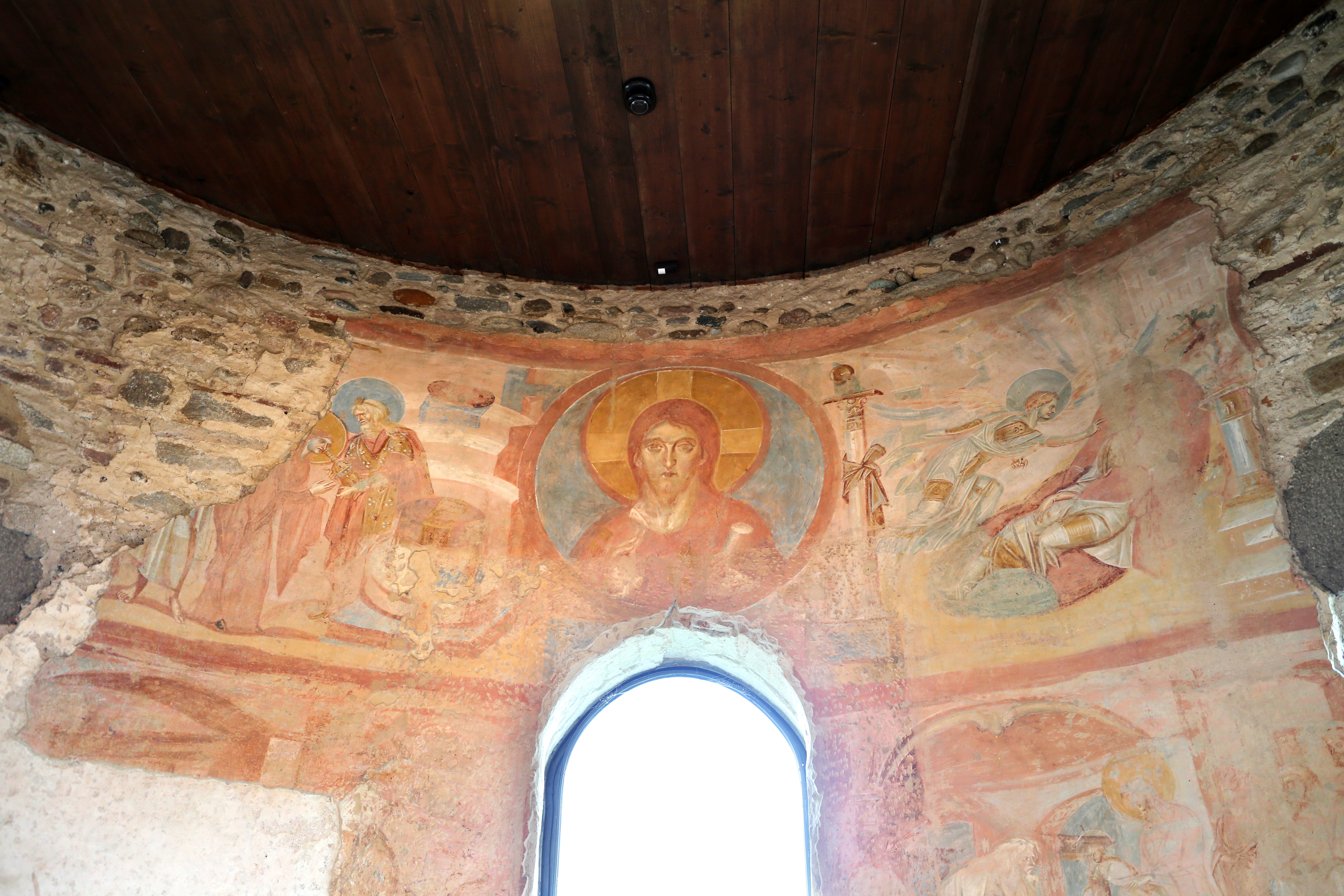
Centre of the apse

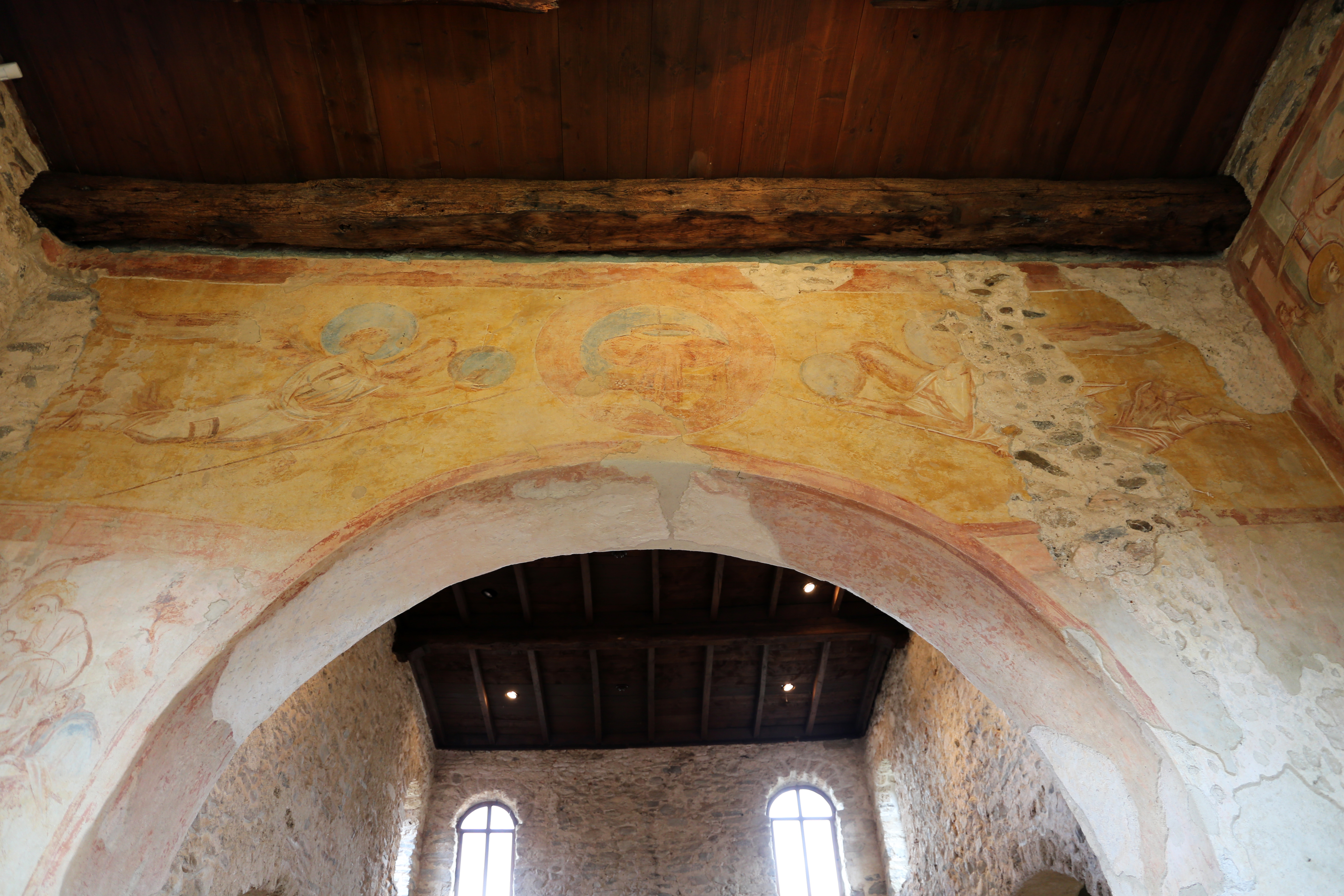
Chencel arch, from the apse

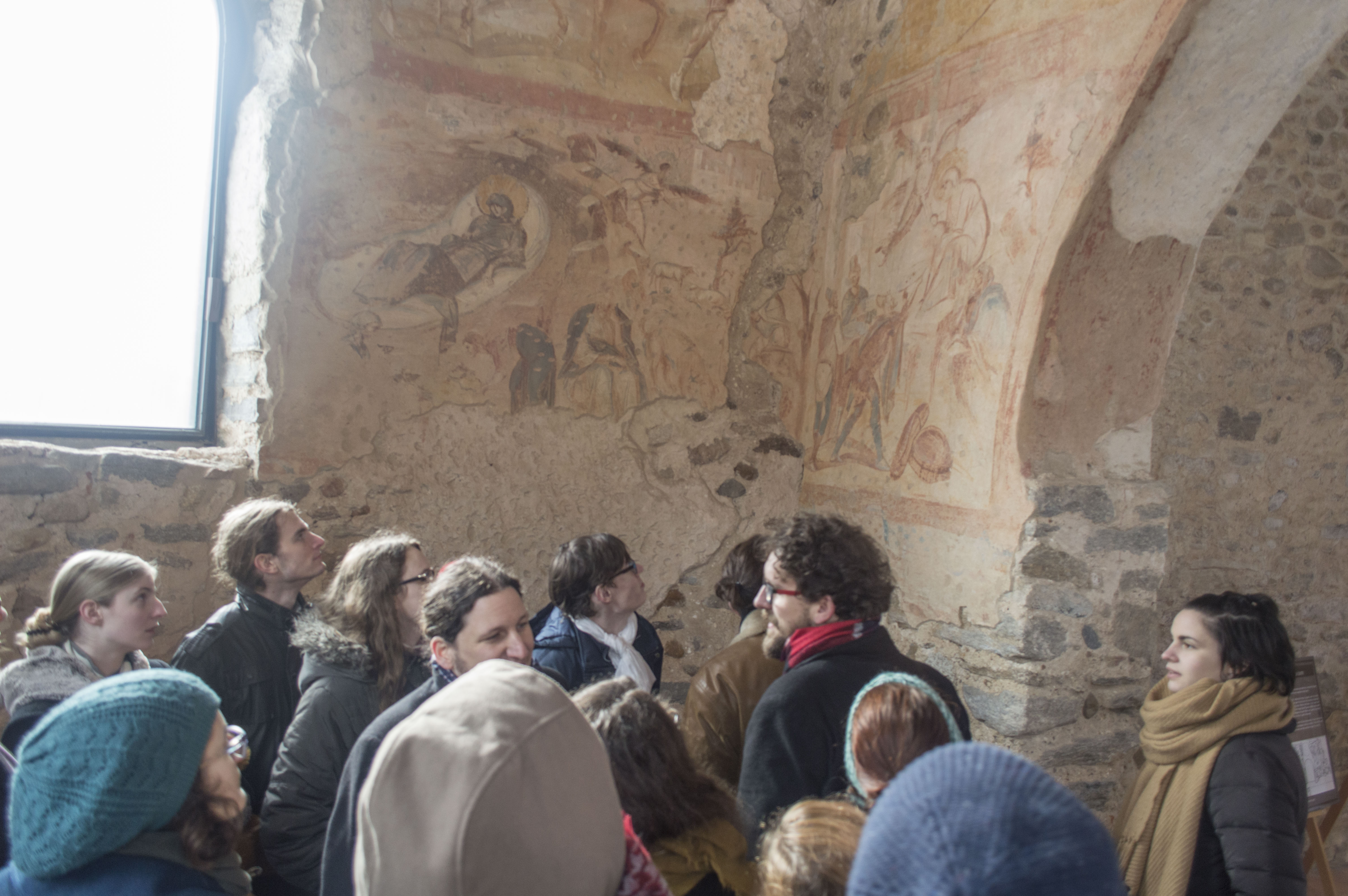
Corner of the apse
