= Ignazio Paluselli =

Italian painter (1744–1779)

Ignaz or Ignazio Paluselli, also called Paduello, (Panchià, Province of Trentino in the Tyrol, 1744–1779) was an Italian painter.

He trained in Padua, hence his nickname. He specialized in painting Bacchanalia and mythologic scenes both in Northern Italy and England. He painted the Via Crucis for the parish church of Avio, Trentino. He died in Rovereto.
