= Lagarina Valley =

Valley in northern Italy

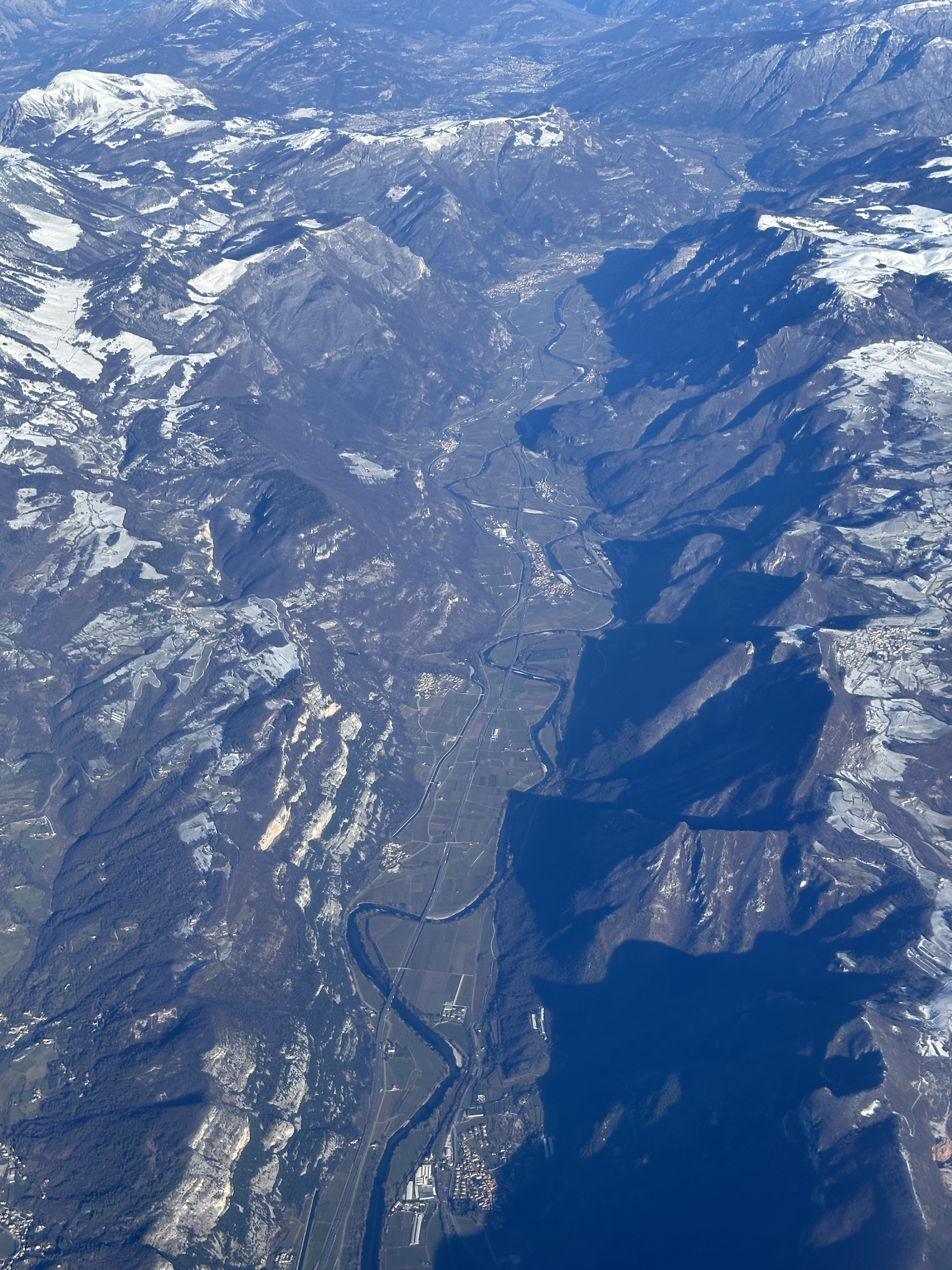
The Adige flowing through the lower Lagarina Valley. Rovereto can be seen in the distance.

Lagarina Valley (Italian: Vallagarina, German: Lagertal) is a valley in northern Italy, used to define the lower mountain course of the Adige River. It is mostly included in the province of Trentino, with the lower section being part of the province of Verona. The largest town is Rovereto.

== Geography ==
The upper limit of the valley is generally set at the so-called "Murazzi", north to Besenello and about 10 kilometres (6.2 mi) south to Trento. Above this it is known as Val d'Adige. The lower limit is the entrance in the Padan Plain, near the Chiusa di Ceraino.

As with the Val d'Adige, the Vallagarina is of glacial origin. Orographically, it separates the Brescian and Gardesane Prealps to the west from the Venetian prealps to the east.

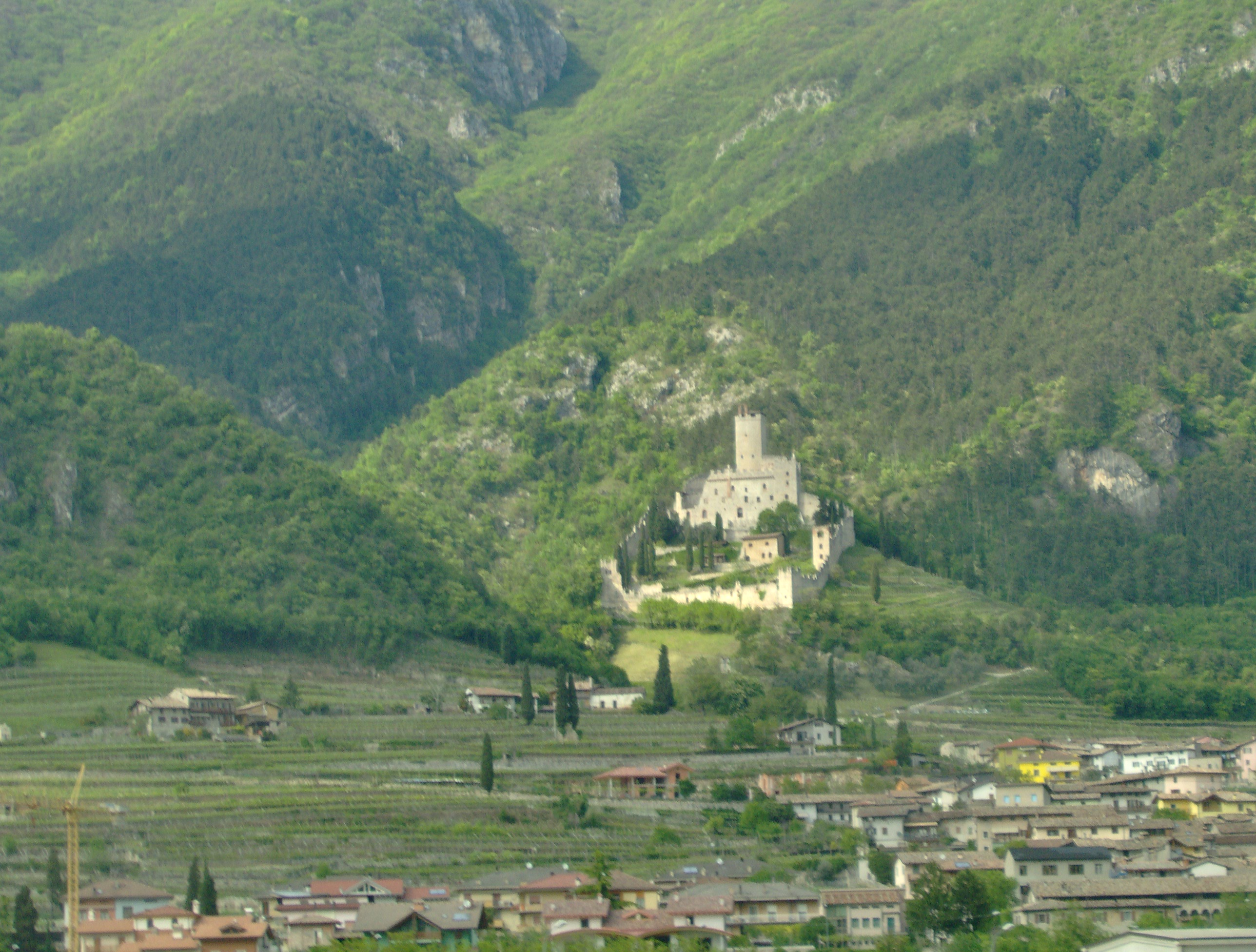
Castle on hill above the town of Avio.

== History ==
The valley is home to several forts built by the Austrian Empire in the 19th century and older castles, such as Castle of Avio which dates to the 11th century.

In the locality Lavini di Marco, near Rovereto, are several dinosaur footprints attributed to the genera Camptosaurus and Dilophosaurus. The same locality is mentioned by Dante in his Inferno (Canto XII).

== Gallery ==
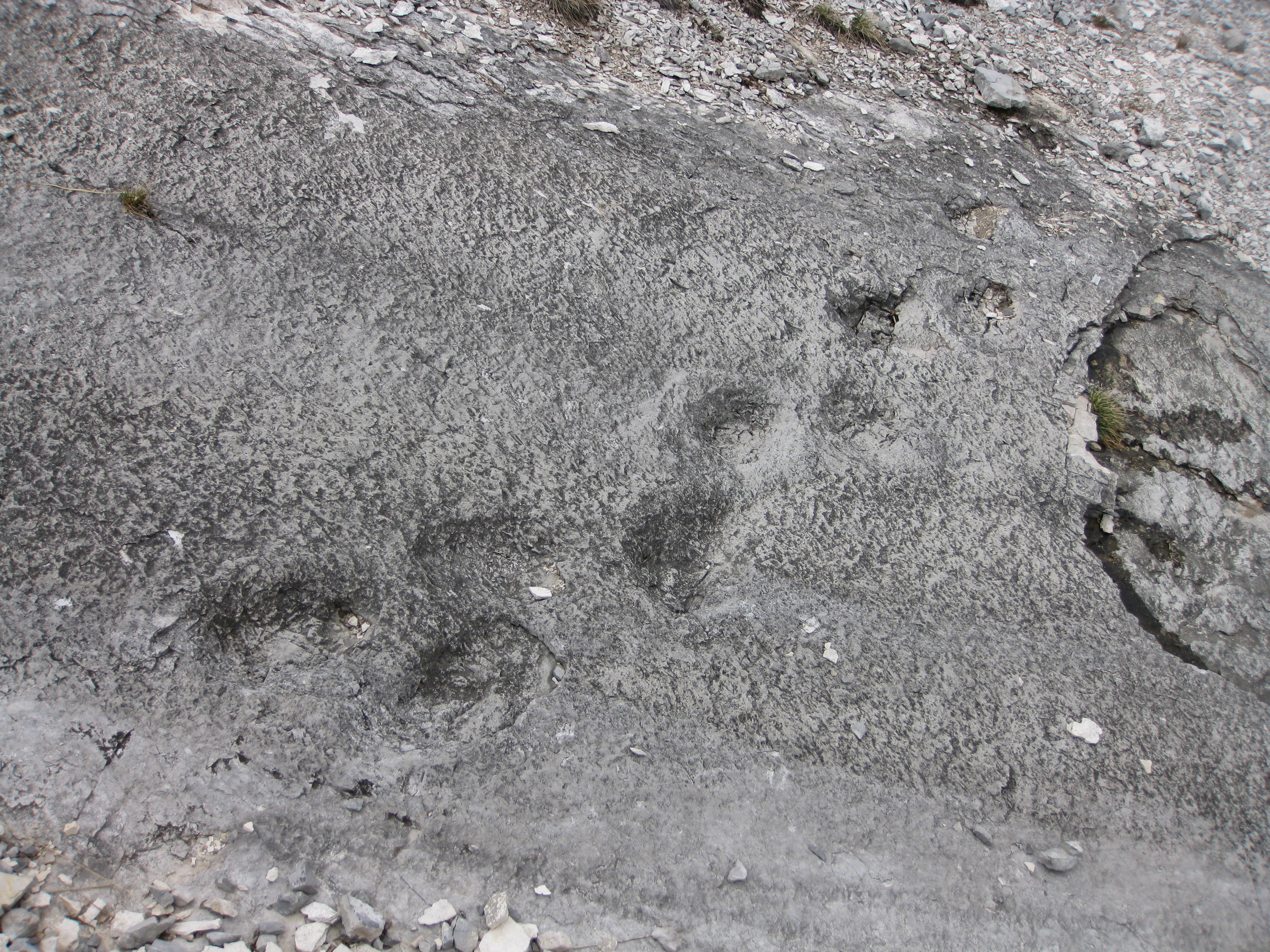
Dinosaur footprints at Lavini di Marco.

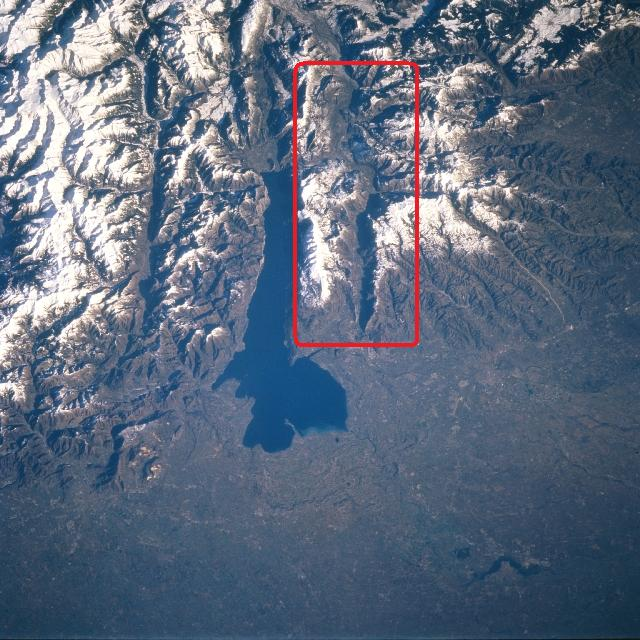
Satellite view of the Lagarina Valley (red box).
