= Giovanni Maria Falconetto =

Italian painter (c. 1468–1535)

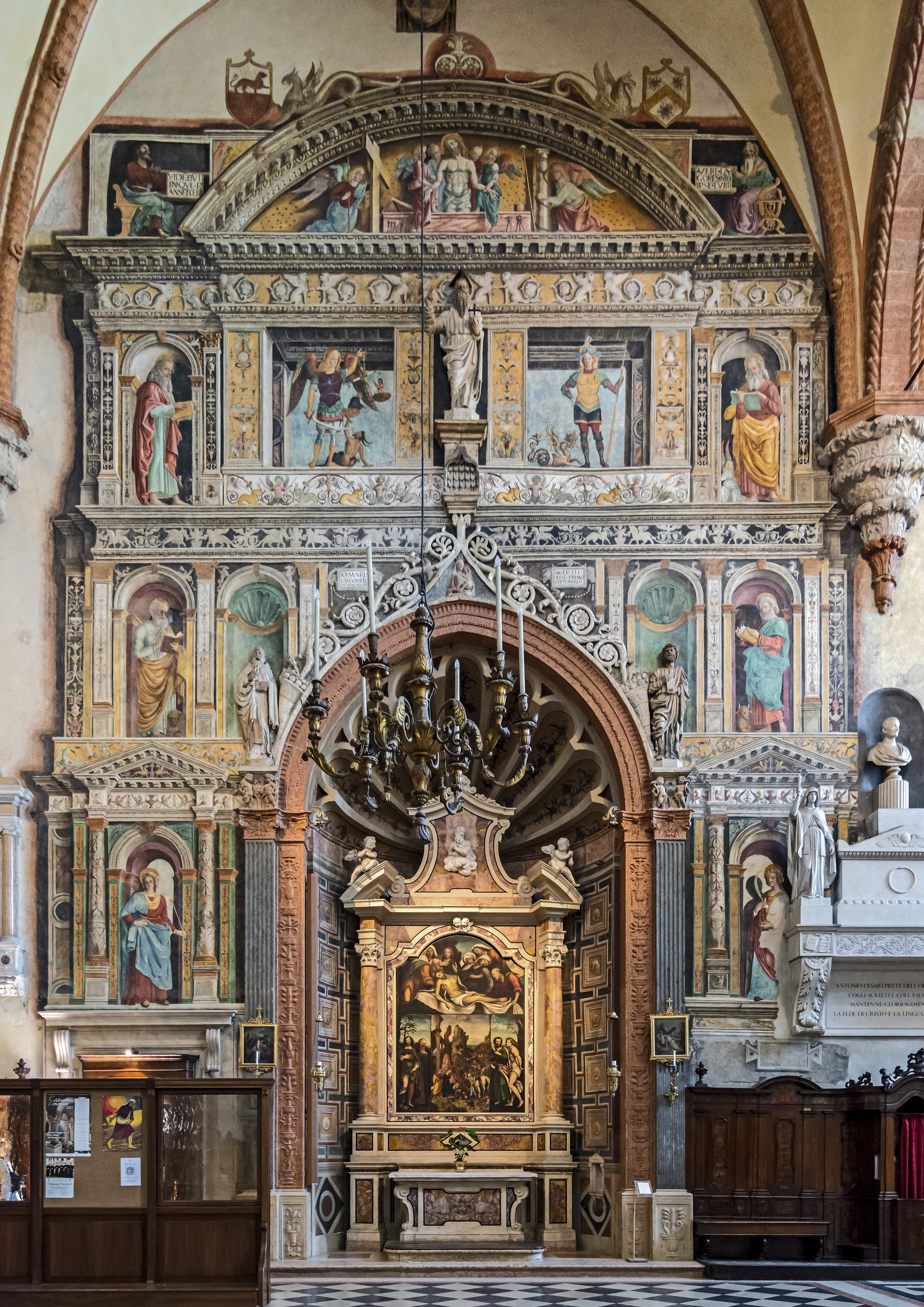
Frescoes of the Verona Cathedral 1503

Giovanni Maria Falconetto (c. 1468–1535) was an Italian architect and painter. He designed among the first high Renaissance buildings in Padua, the Loggia Cornaro, a garden loggia for Alvise Cornaro built as a Roman doric arcade. Along with his brother, Giovanni Antonio Falconetto, he was among the most prominent painters of Verona and Padua in the early 16th century.

== Biography ==
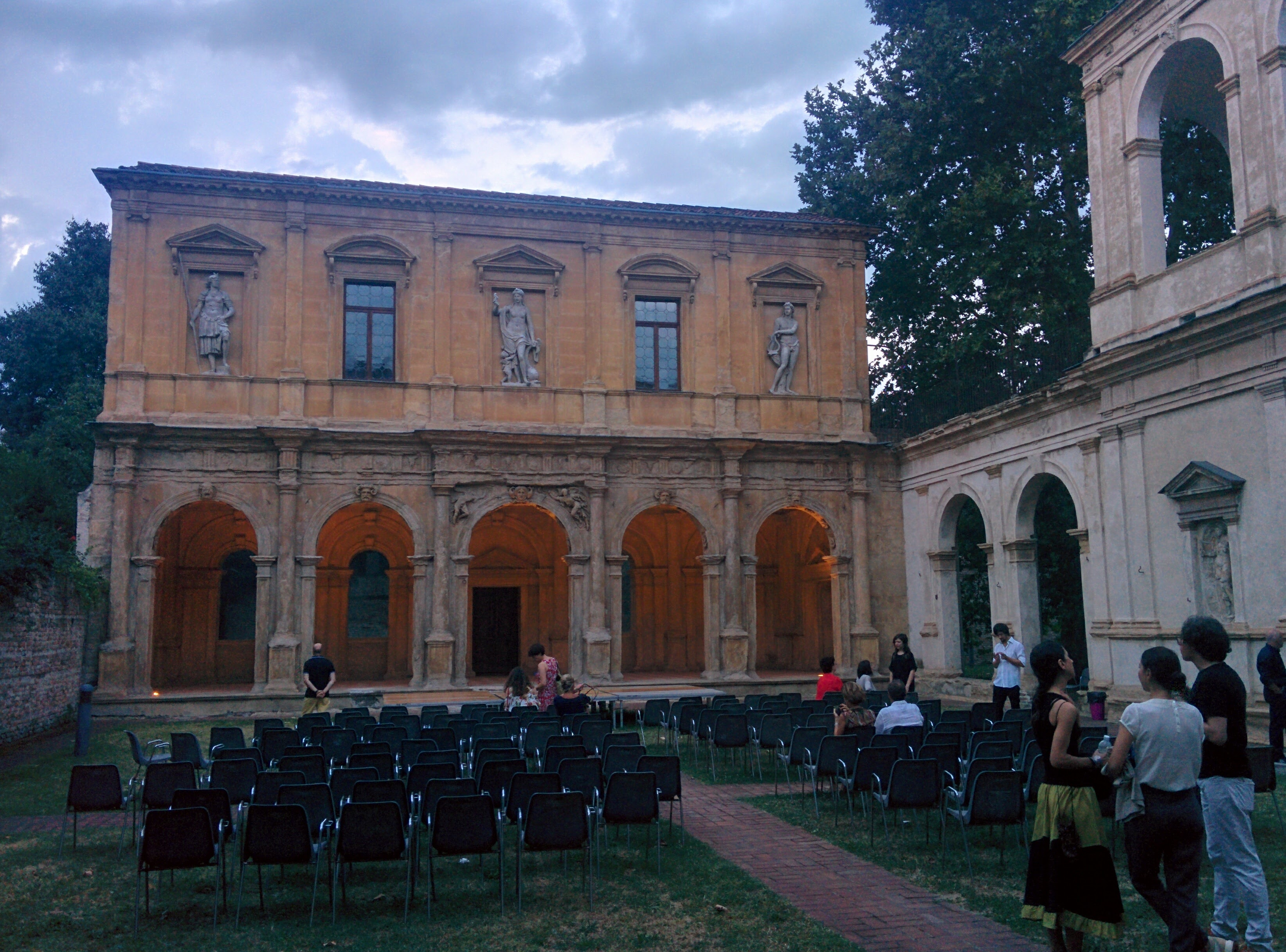
Loggia Cornaro, Padua

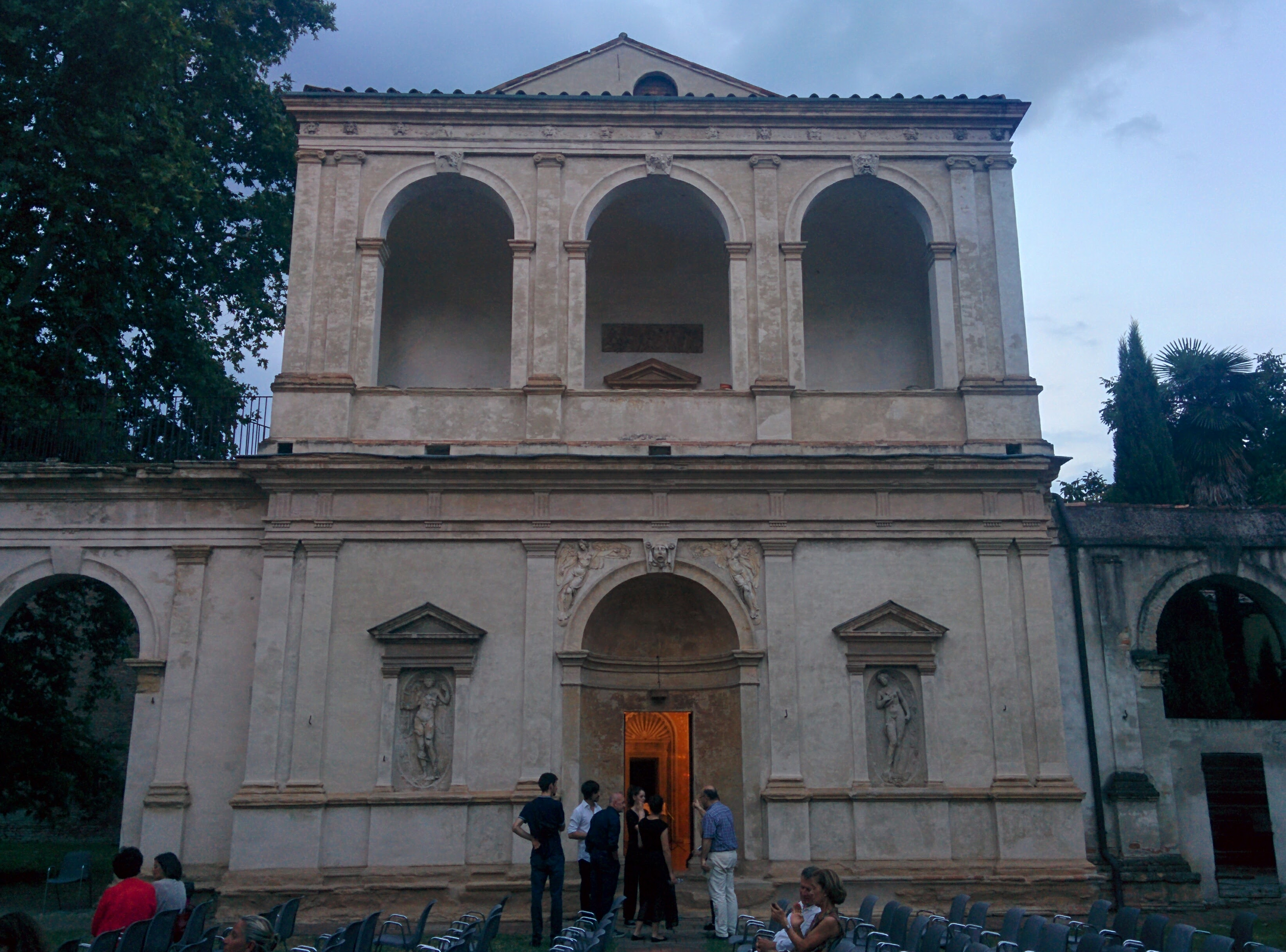
Odeo Cornaro, Padua

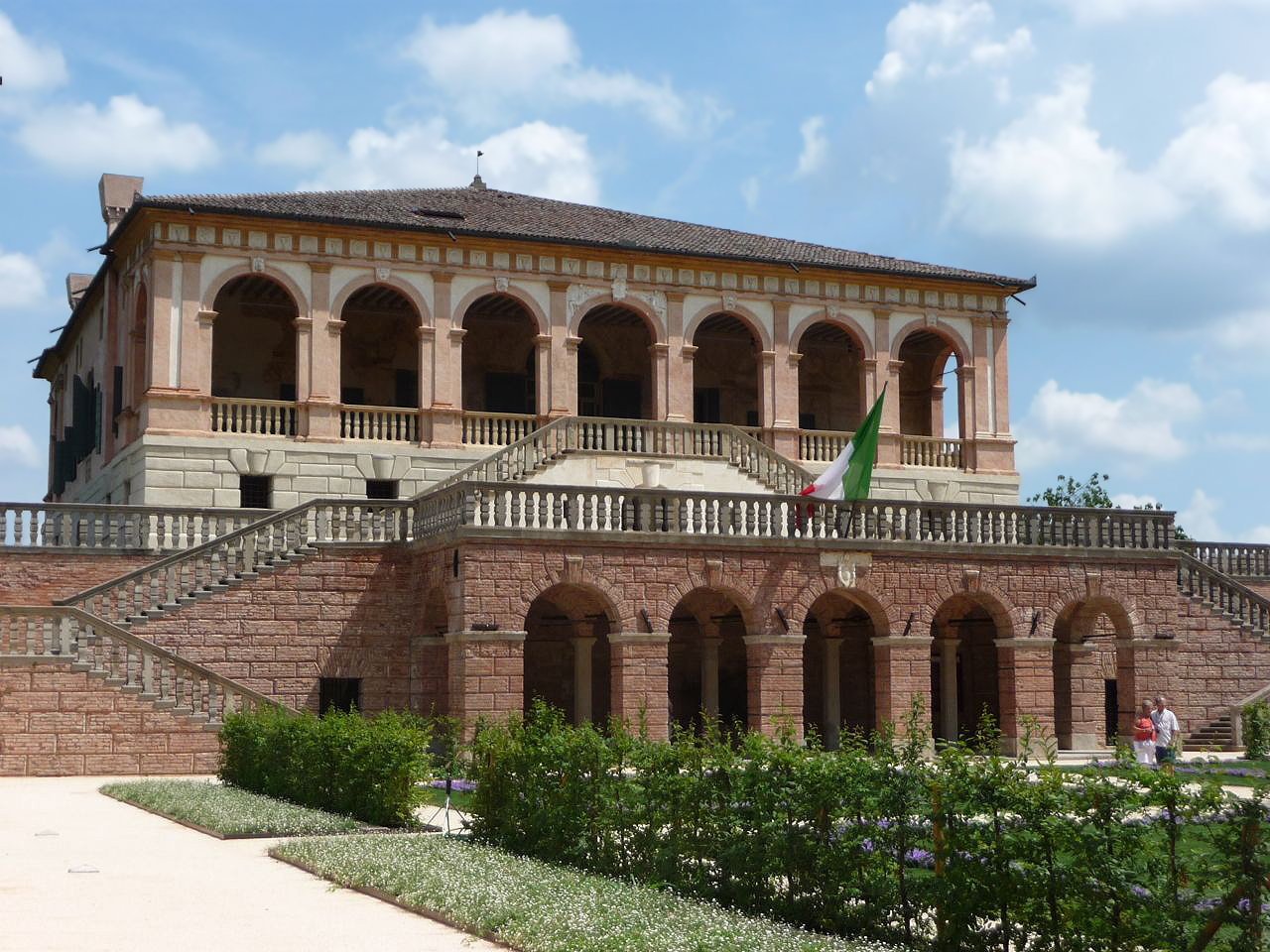
Garden façade of Villa dei Vescovi, Torreglia

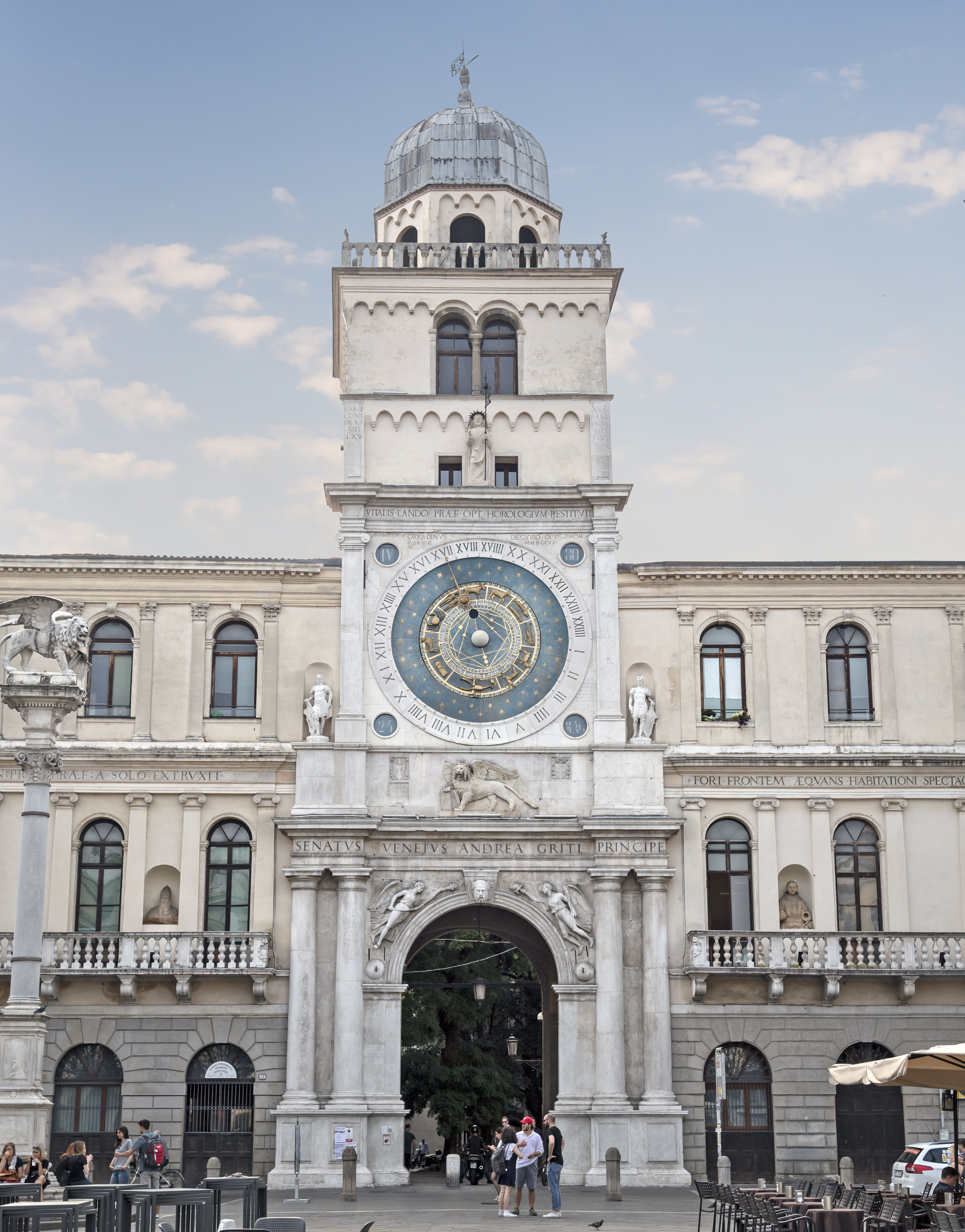
Entrance portal at base of Torre dell'Orologio, Padua

Falconetto was born in Verona into an established family of Veronese painters and studied in Rome for a time, in the studio of Melozzo da Forlì. On his return to Verona his standing in his rione made him of use to Emperor Maximilian, who was headquartered in Verona from 1509 to 1517, during the episode of the Italian Wars called the War of the League of Cambrai, and not simply for painting imperial arms to replace those of Venice that had been effaced on Maximilian's orders. With the return of a Venetian governor, Falconetto and his family were proscribed and seem to have withdrawn to Trent.

Later his career was passed at Padua, where he was drawn by the patronage of Pietro Bembo and Alvise Cornaro, for whom Falconetto designed the Villa Cornaro at Este (since remodelled), of which an imposing adjacent gate remains. Cornaro's influence with the Bishop of Padua doubtless elicited Falconetto's commission to design the Villa dei Vescovi ("Villa of the Bishops") located in the town limits of Torreglia in the Euganean Hills.

Other works of architecture at Padua include the Loggia Carnica, the Porta S. Giovanni and Porta Savonarola in the city walls, and the arch in Piazza dei Signori. Nearby, he designed the church at Codevigo.

As a painter, several works by Falconetto are in the Museo Civico housed in the Castelvecchio. His frescos in the Duomo reappeared in 1870 from under their coat of whitewash applied in 1630 at a time of plague. Frescoes securely attributed to Falconetto decorate the Sala dello Zodiaco in the Palazzo di Bagno, now within Palazzo d'Arco, Mantua, probably executed c. 1520 for a member of the Gonzaga family, as Vasari remarks, "he produced at Mantua several things for signor Luigi Gonzaga". (Note: This could be either Aloisio Gonzaga (1494-1549) or Louis Gonzaga (Rodomonte) (1500-1532).)

He died in Padua in 1535.

== Gallery of Salla dello Zodiaco in Mantua ==
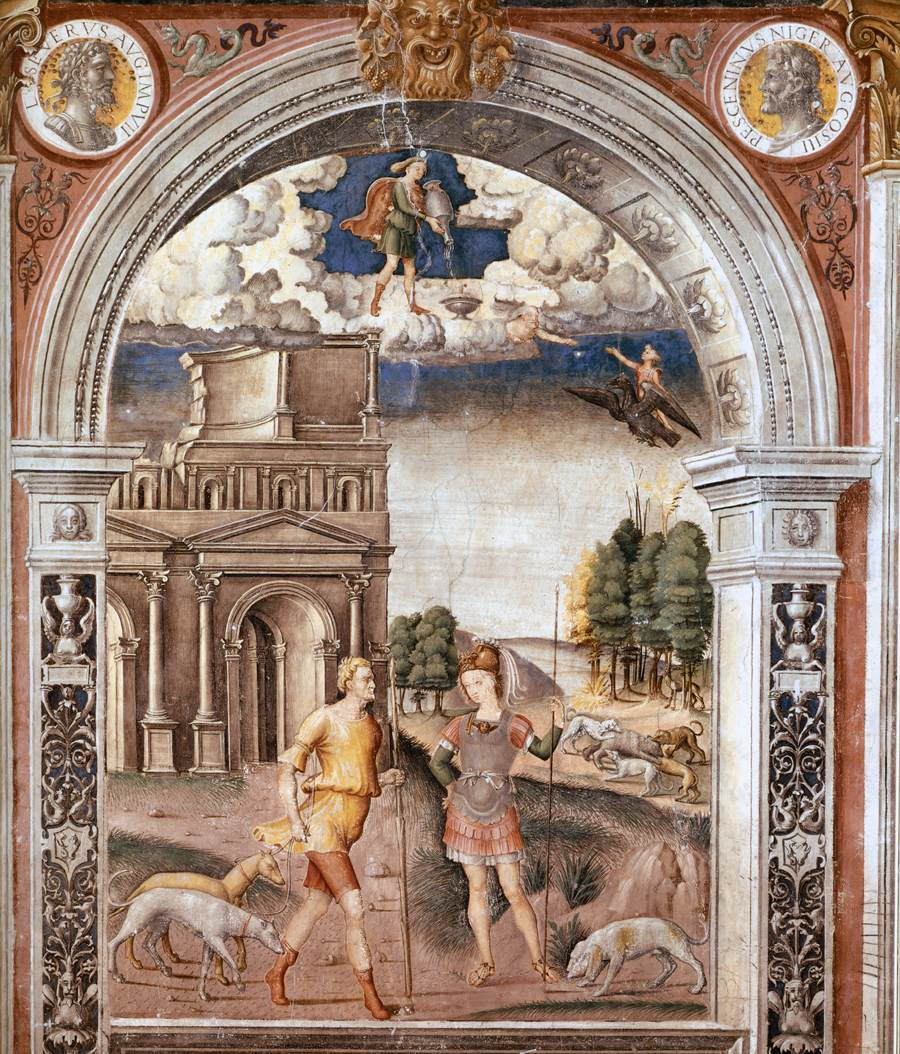
Aquarius

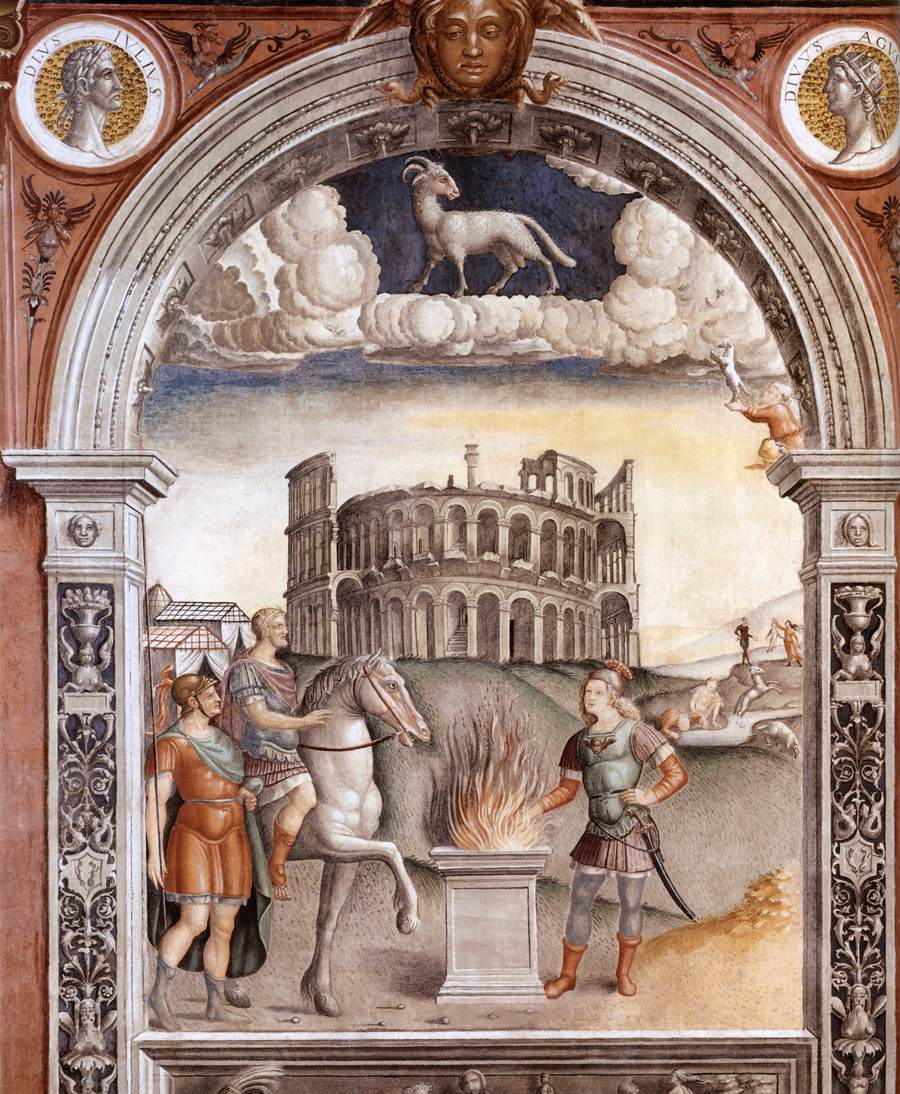
Aries

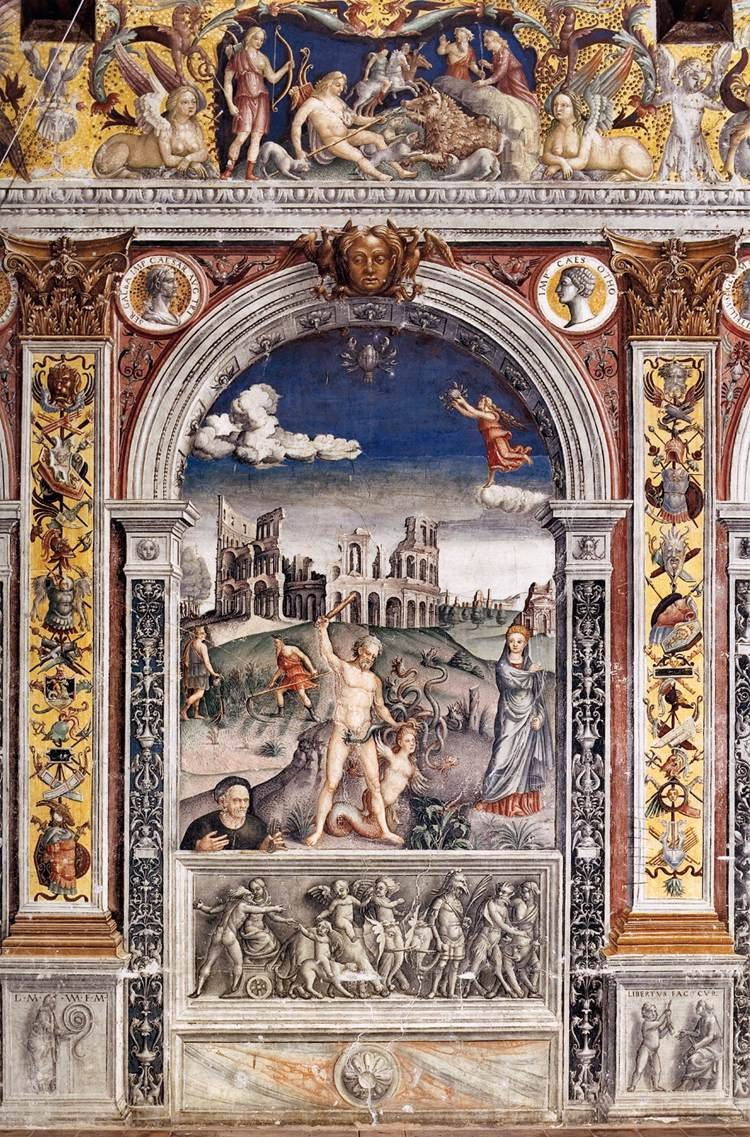
Cancer

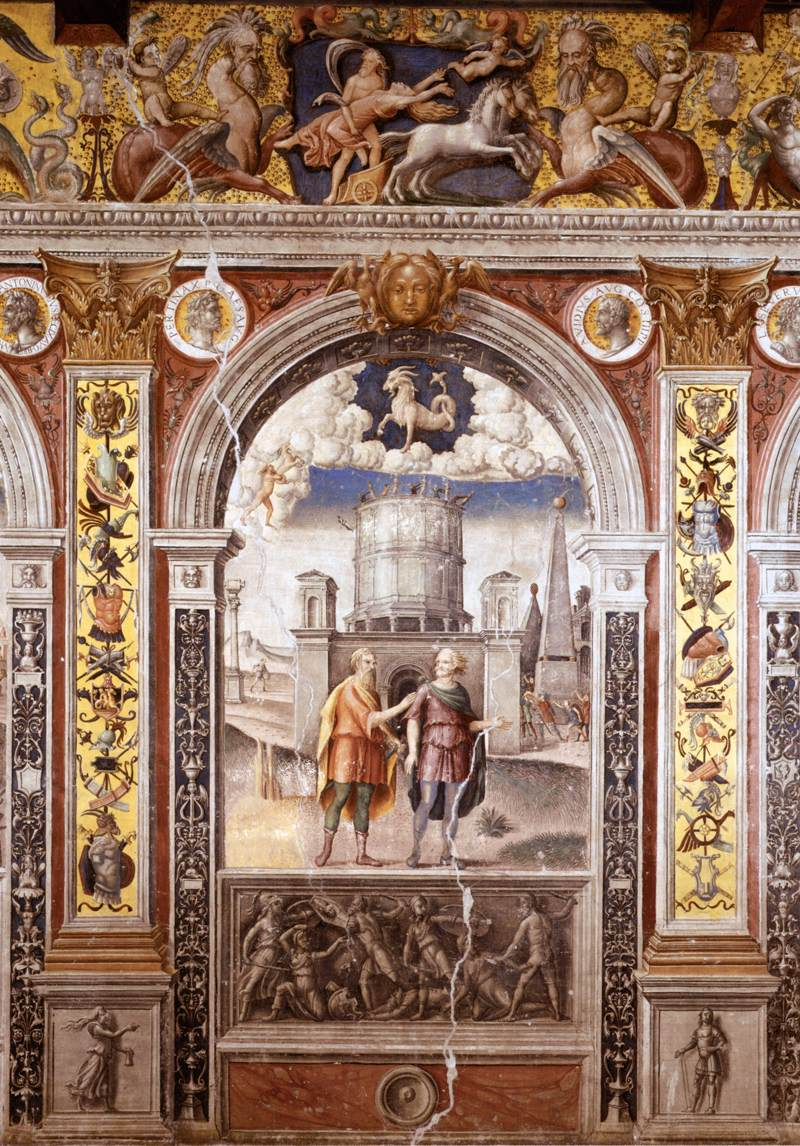
Capricorn

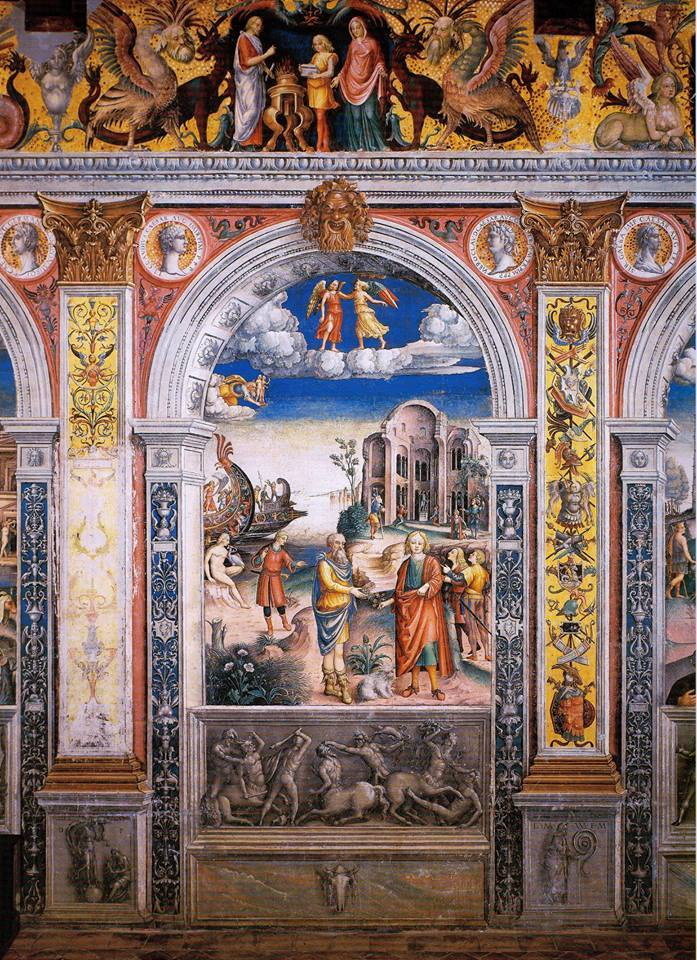
Gemini

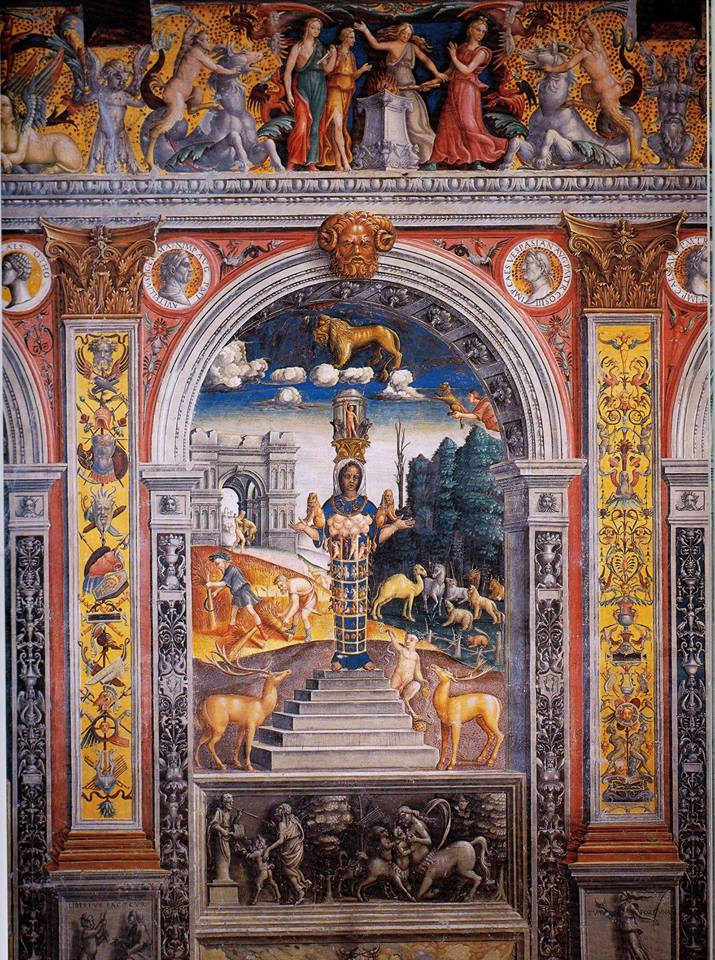
Leo

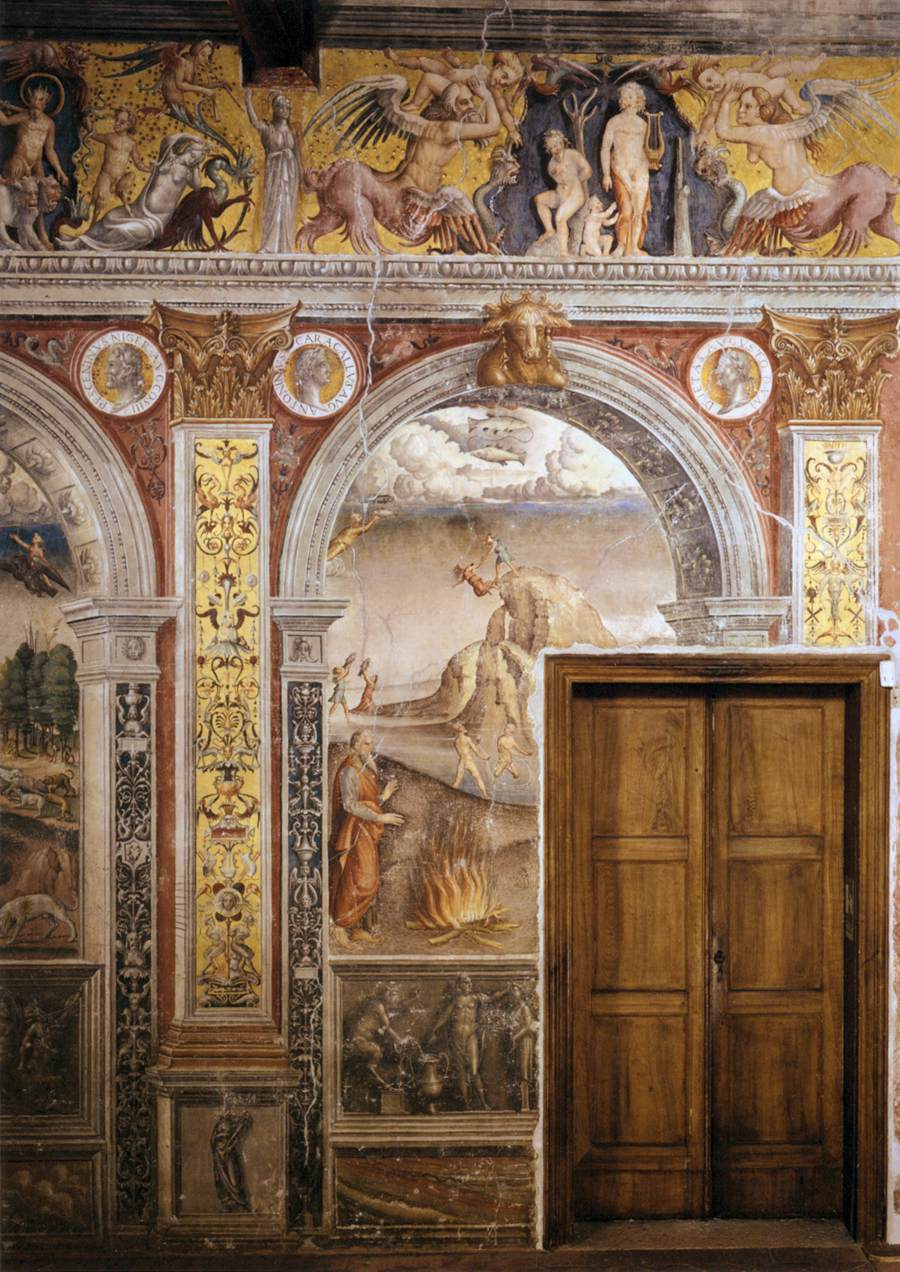
Pisces

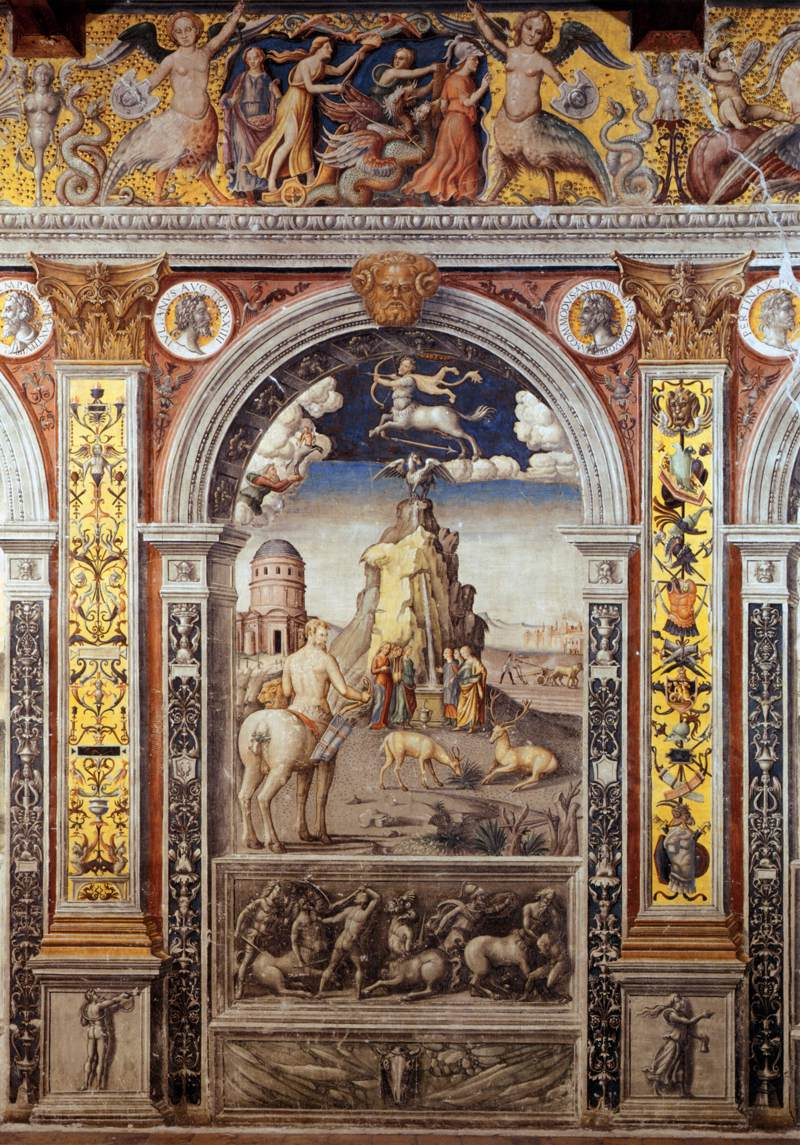
Sagittarius

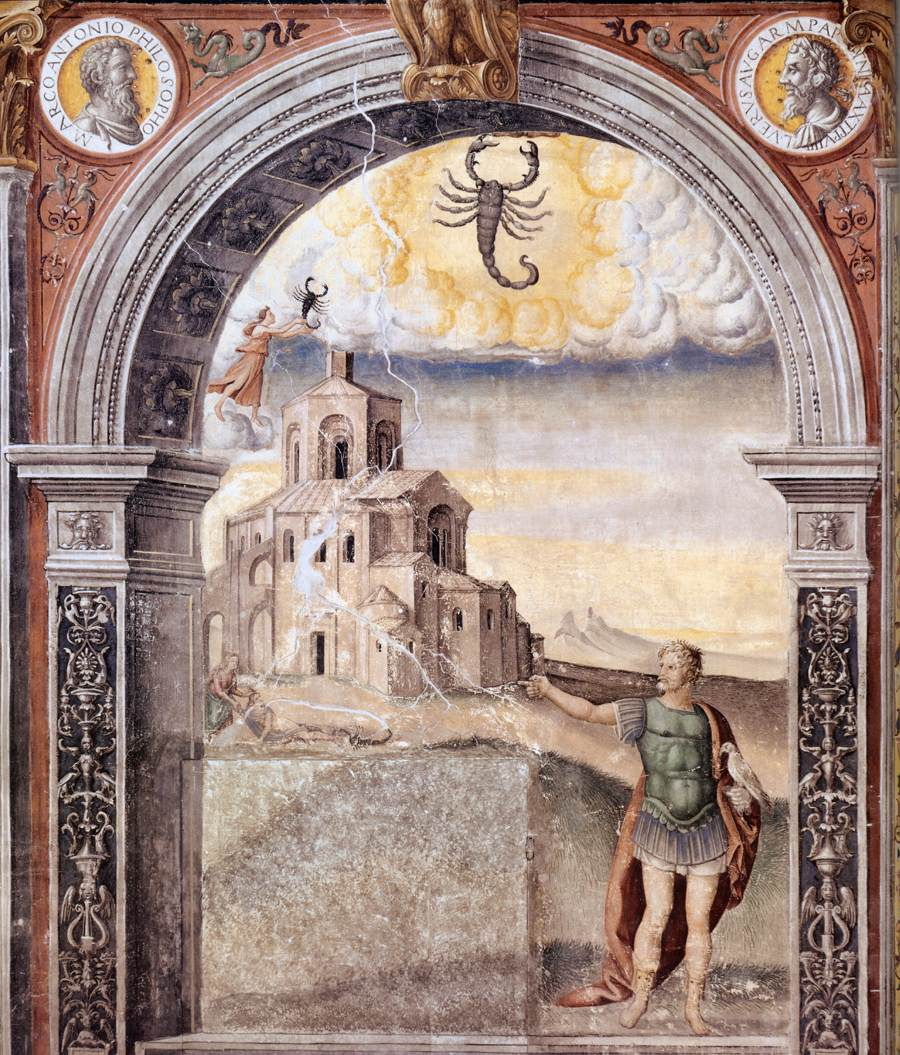
Scorpio

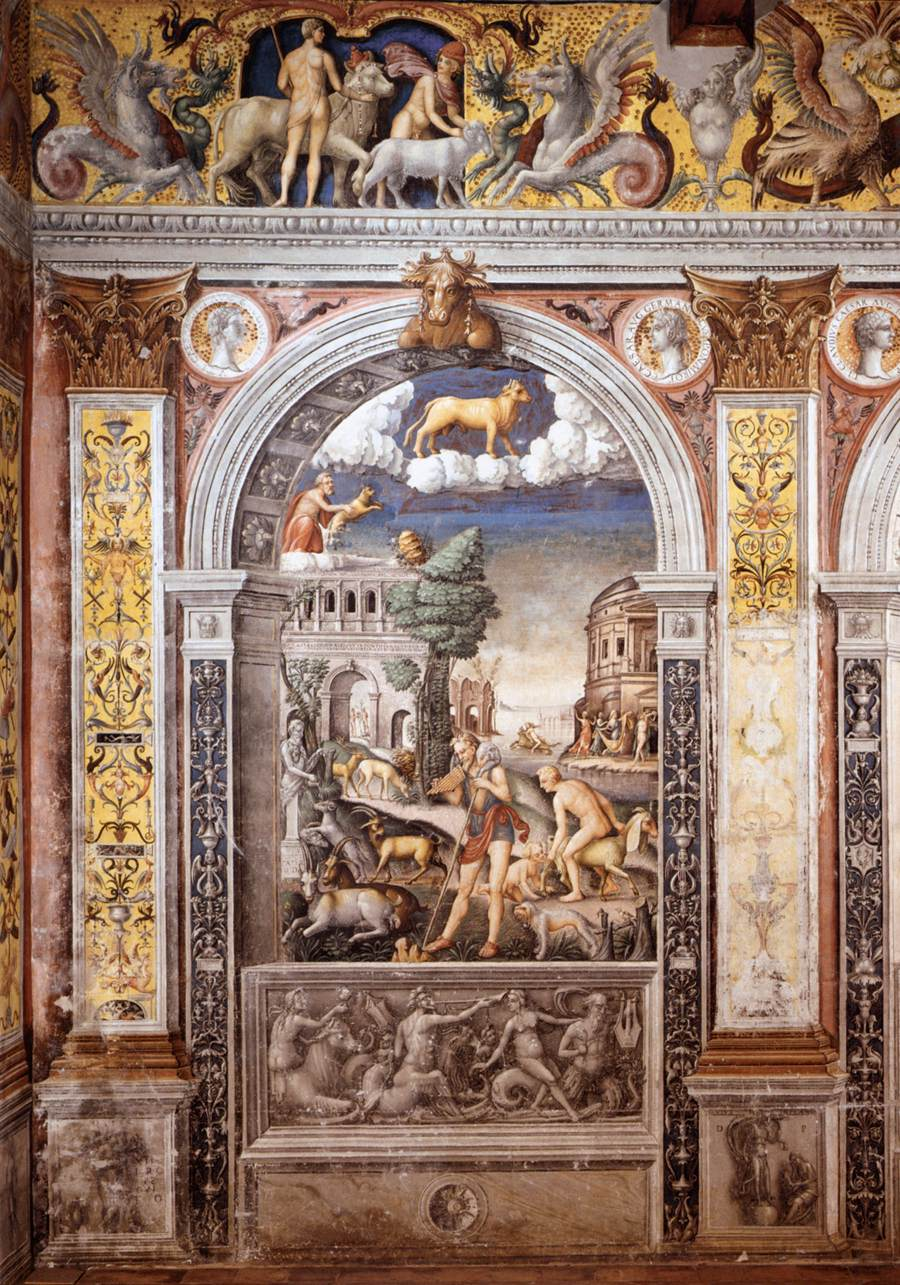
Taurus

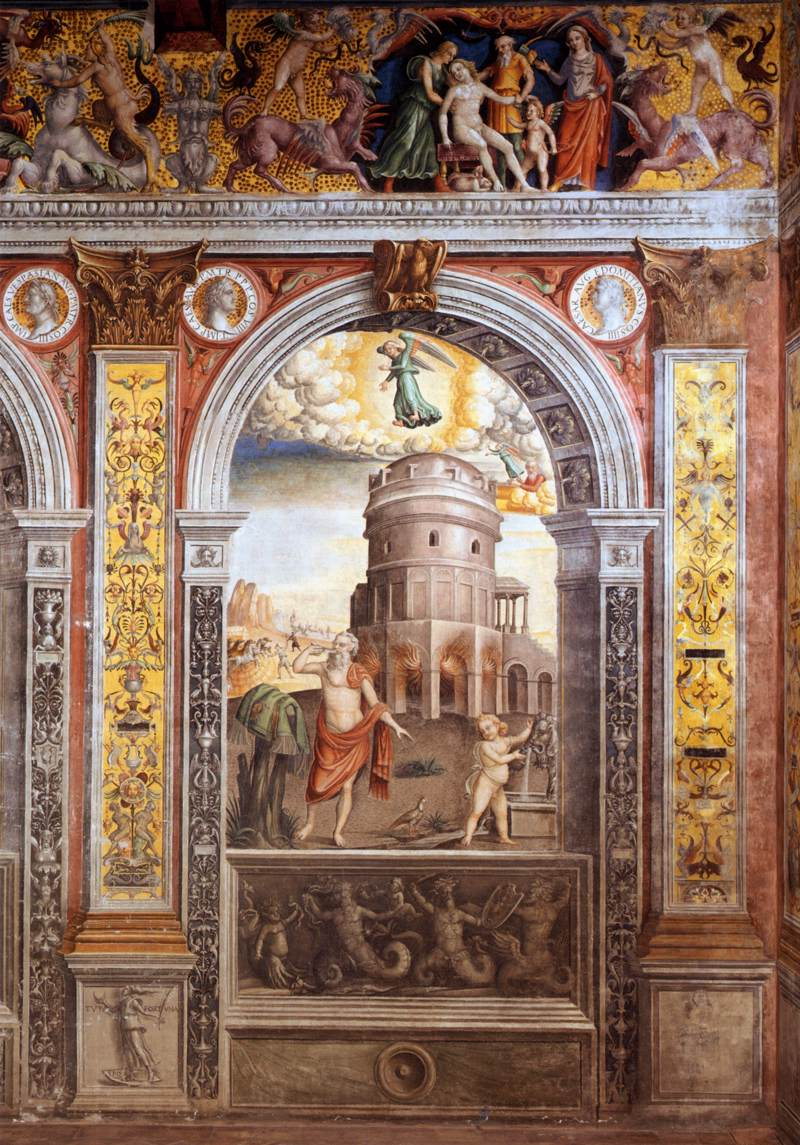
Virgo
