= Luigi Cornaro =

Venetian nobleman and philosopher (d. 1566)

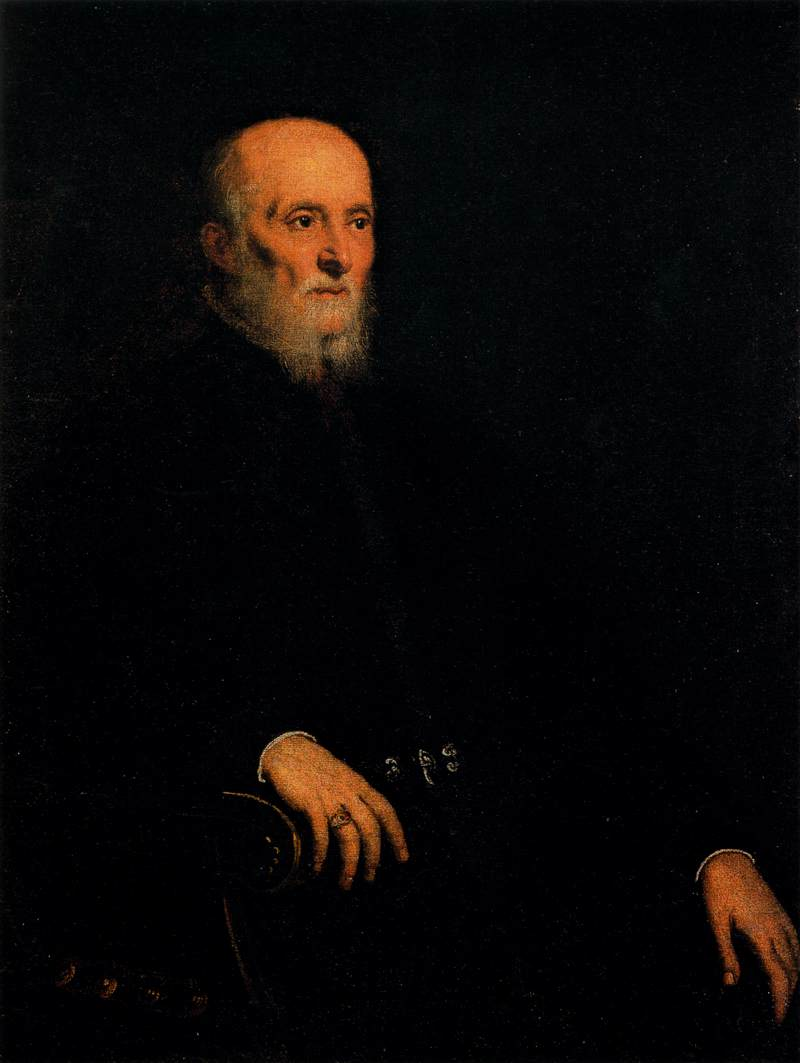
Portrait of Alvise Cornaro by Tintoretto

Alvise Cornaro, often Italianised Luigi (1484, 1467 or 1464 – 8 May 1566), was a Venetian nobleman and patron of arts, also remembered for his four books of Discorsi (published 1583–1595) about the secrets to living long.

== Early life ==
Born in Padua, in the Republic of Venice, the son of an innkeeper, who claimed a connection to the noble Cornaro family of Venice, a connection he was at pains to prove, Cornaro expanded a modest stake from his mother's brother into a fortune based on his entrepreneurial skills, especially in hydraulics that reclaimed wetlands for farming, expressed in his Tratto di Acque ("Tract on Water management") of 1566.

== Later life ==
As a patron, Cornaro sat to Tintoretto for his portrait and guided the career of the Veronese artist-architect Giovanni Maria Falconetto, whose Loggia and Odeo Cornaro (1524) for Alvise's then suburban garden in Padua was an early Renaissance-style building in the Veneto. As financial advisor to the Bishop of Padua, he secured for Falconetto the commission to design the Villa dei Vescovi ("Villa of the Bishops") at Luvigliano, in the Eugaean Hills, as well as his own Villa Cornaro in Este. Later in life, from about 1538, Cornaro was acquainted with the young mason who was to become Andrea Palladio. Cornaro's own views on architecture are expressed in his Trattato dell'architettura ("Treatise on Architecture"). Cornaro constructed two theatres, the Odeo Cornaro in Padua and another in the gardens of his villa at Este.

== Publications ==
When he was about 40, Cornaro found himself exhausted and in poor health, a condition he attributed to a hedonistic lifestyle with excessive eating, drinking, and sexual licentiousness. On the advice of doctors, he began to adhere to a calorie restriction diet centered on the "quantifying principle" of restricting himself to only 350g of food daily (including bread, egg yolk, meat, and soup) and 414 mL of wine. His book Discorsi della vita sobria (Discourses On the Temperate Life), which described his regimen, was extremely successful, and "was a true reconceptualization of old age. As late as the Renaissance it was largely the negative aspects of this phase of life which were emphasized ... Cornaro’s method offered the possibility for the first time not only of a long but also a worthwhile life." After his conversion to a holistic lifestyle, he remained in vigorous health well into old age.

In 1550, when Cornaro claimed to be about 83, he was urged to write down his secrets of health, and its English translation, often referred to today under the title The Sure and Certain Method of Attaining a Long and Healthful Life, went through numerous editions; he wrote three follow-ups in 1553, 1558, and 1562. The first three were published at Padua in 1558. They are written, says Joseph Addison, in the early 18th century periodical The Spectator (No. 195), "with such a spirit of cheerfulness, religion and good sense, as are the natural concomitants of temperance and sobriety." Friedrich Nietzsche criticized the work for mistaking the consequence with the cause, insisting that Cornaro's diet is not the cause of his long life, but rather that the cause of his long life - which Nietzsche gives as his slow metabolism - is the reason for his diet.

Cornaro maintained that longevity was desirable and "God wills it". He rejected ascetics who believed man must suffer in this life to attain salvation in the next, arguing that there was no reason one could not enjoy both his earthly existence and his heavenly one. In addition, he rejected conventional wisdom that old age was a period of misery and decay, writing "And now some sensual and unreasonable individuals pretend that the existence of a man after he passes the age of 65 cannot be termed a living one, but a dead one. I will plainly demonstrate that they are mistaken, for I have a desire that all men should attain my age, which is the most beautiful period of life." He also commented that at the age of 83, his health was good, he could perform most functions unassisted, and he had a wide circle of younger friends and correspondents. Cornaro also firmly condemned those with a live-fast-and-die-young mentality, stating that "They don't stop and consider the virtue of ten more years of active life, at a point where we've reached a high point of experience and wisdom, two things that can only be honed with time."

He died at Padua at age 98, according to his birth and death date in the 1911 Encyclopædia Britannica; other sources give his age at death as 102. However, Cornaro deliberately overstated his age by consistently increasing amounts as he got older. Therefore, it seems safer to assume his birth date to be 1484, the one he declared in an esposto he lodged to Serenissima, both because of the degree of officialism imposed by that context and because that date is the latest among the ones he provided along his life.

In the work known as Illustrissimi, a collection of letters written by Pope John Paul I when he was Patriarch of Venice, Cornaro serves as one of the "recipients" of the letters. There are 40 letters in all, mainly to people in Italian history and fiction, but also to internationally well known fictional and historical characters such as Pinocchio, Charles Dickens, Hippocrates, and Jesus.
