= Loggia and Odeo Cornaro =

16th century buildings in Padua, Italy

Coordinates: 45°24′08″N 11°52′56″E

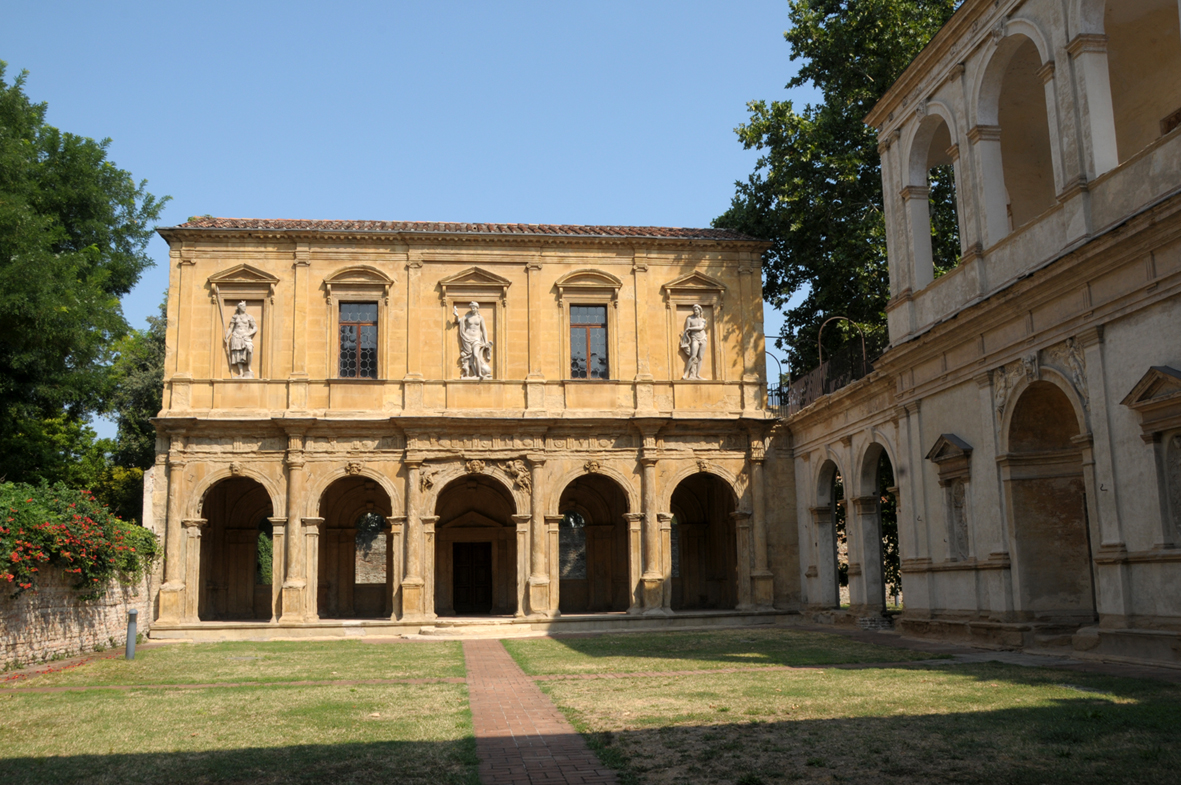
Loggia Cornaro with adjacent Odeo on right

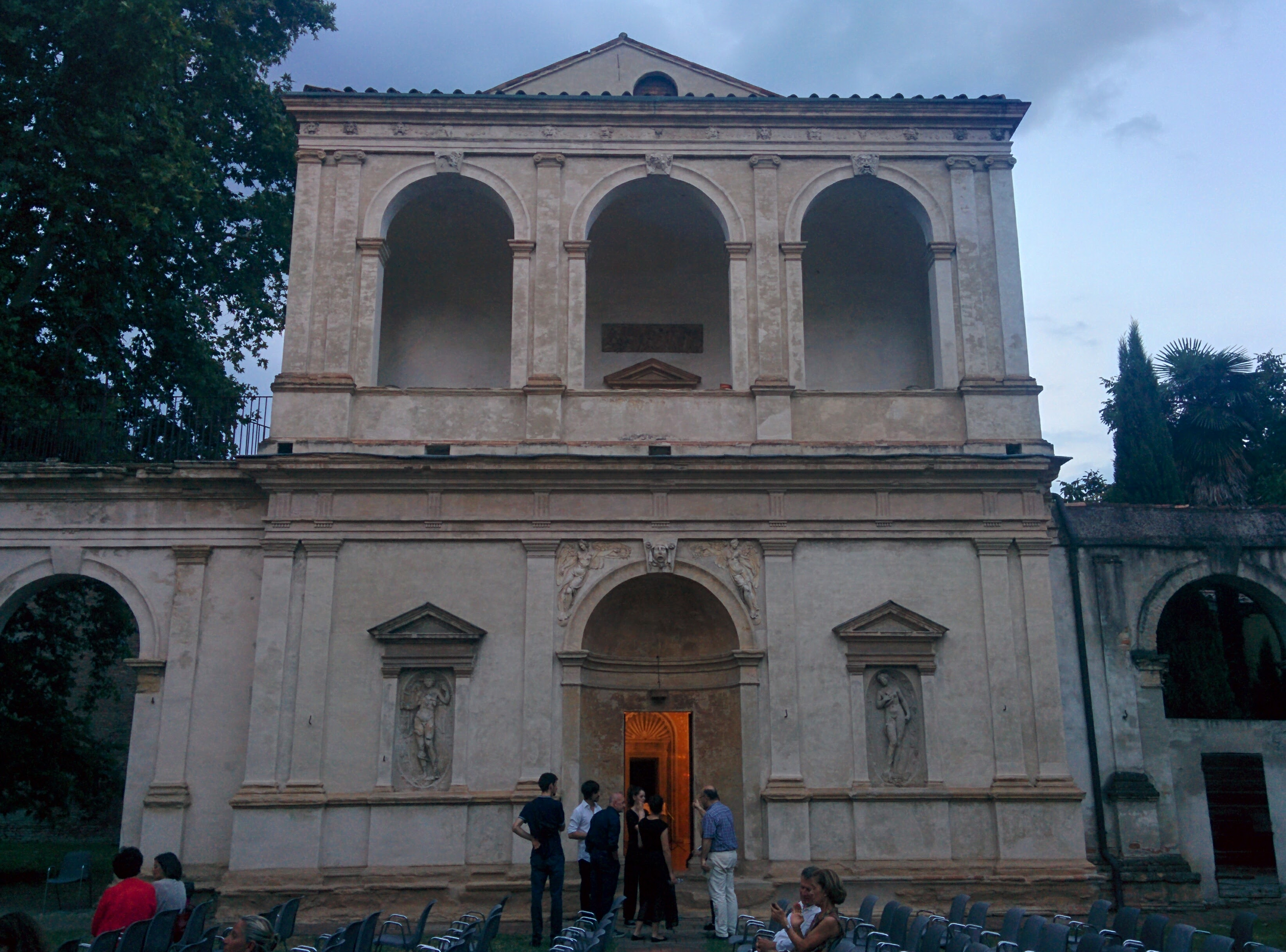
Facade of Odeo Cornaro

The Loggia and Odeo Cornaro are two Renaissance buildings, built in the 16th century for the humanist Alvise Cornaro and hosting theater and music performances, locate in via Cesarotti 37 in Padua, region of Veneto, Italy. They are now part of the city's museums.

== History ==
The entrepreneurial Alvise Cornaro (circa 1480–1566) built these two buildings as part of what appears to be a villa di delizia ("villa of delights"). Cornaro commissioned the buildings from Veronese architect Giovanni Maria Falconetto. The land and gardens on which the ensemble was built were then located at the edge of the city limits.

The two story Loggia building was completed in 1524. It has a ground floor loggia or arcade which was presumably used for theatric performances. To the side of this structure is the Odeo, or Odeum, which has a central octagonal room frescoed with marine motifs and grotteschi, and ringed by niches. The façades of these buildings still have their original sculptures. The also called Rotonda di Padova is said to have been influential for Andrea Palladio's Villa Capra near Vicenza.

The area once contained a larger complex of structures no longer existent. The present buildings were donated to the city of Padua in 1968 by the Countess Giulia Giusti del Giardino, formerly Bianchini d'Alberigo.
