= Portrait of Alvise Cornaro =

16th century Tintoretto portrait of a Paduan scholar

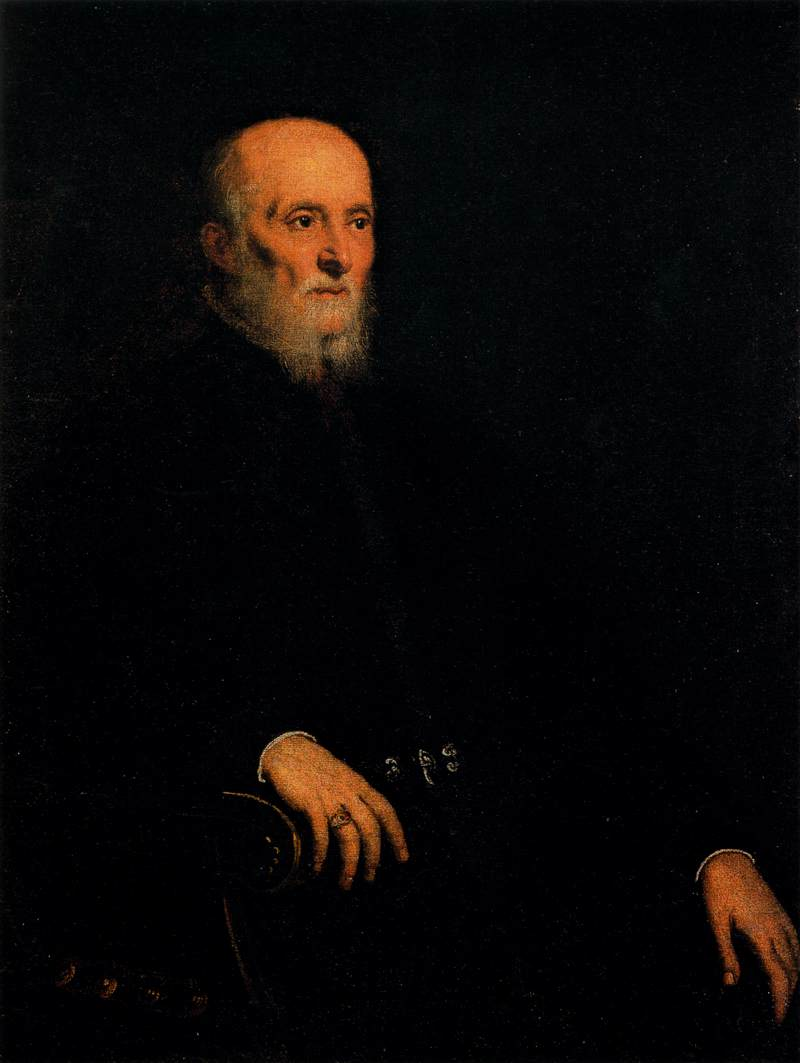
- Artist: Tintoretto
- Year: c. 1560–1565
- Medium: Oil on canvas
- Dimensions: 113 cm × 85 cm (44 in × 33 in)
- Location: Palatine Gallery, Florence

The Portrait of Alvise Cornaro is a portrait by the Venetian painter Tintoretto, showing the man of letters Alvise 'Luigi' Cornaro. Datable to around 1560–1565, it was acquired by Leopoldo de' Medici and is now in the Galleria Palatina in Florence. For the time between the 1698 and 1829 inventories, it was mis-attributed to Titian.

== History ==
The earliest record of the work is its purchase by Leopoldo de' Medici. Between 1698 and 1829, it was thought that the painting was made by Titian. In the Palazzo Pitti, it is possible to track the placement of paintings in varies rooms of the ducal apartments. During one of these moves, the painting's original frame was lost. The inventories recorded it as adorned and carved. The painting's frame today, also old, originally belonged to a bigger canvas.

== Description and style ==
Alvise Cornaro, a scholar of a noble family that lived most of his life in Padua, wrote treatises and patroned a small court of scientists and scholars. In one of his works, he praised the "sober life." In fact, Tintoretto, in portraying him, emphasized the range of his cultural interests and underlined by his more human aspects through a measured agreement of greys and blacks (the darkness of the background and his clothes) that make his face and hands stand out.

The portrait subject is seated, at half figure, and facing to the right. The right hand, resting on the armrest, displays a sign of nobility—a ring with a stone. He gazes absently out of the canvas, while his face displays his age, accentuated by the deep black shadows dug out of his cheeks and temples.

== Bibliography ==
- Chiarini, Marco (1998). Palazzo Pitti, galleria Palatina e Appartamenti Reali (in Italian). Livorno: Sillabe. ISBN 978-88-86392-48-8.
