= Villa dei Vescovi, Luvigliano =

16th-century palace in Veneto, Italy

Coordinates: 45.3434°N 11.7115°E

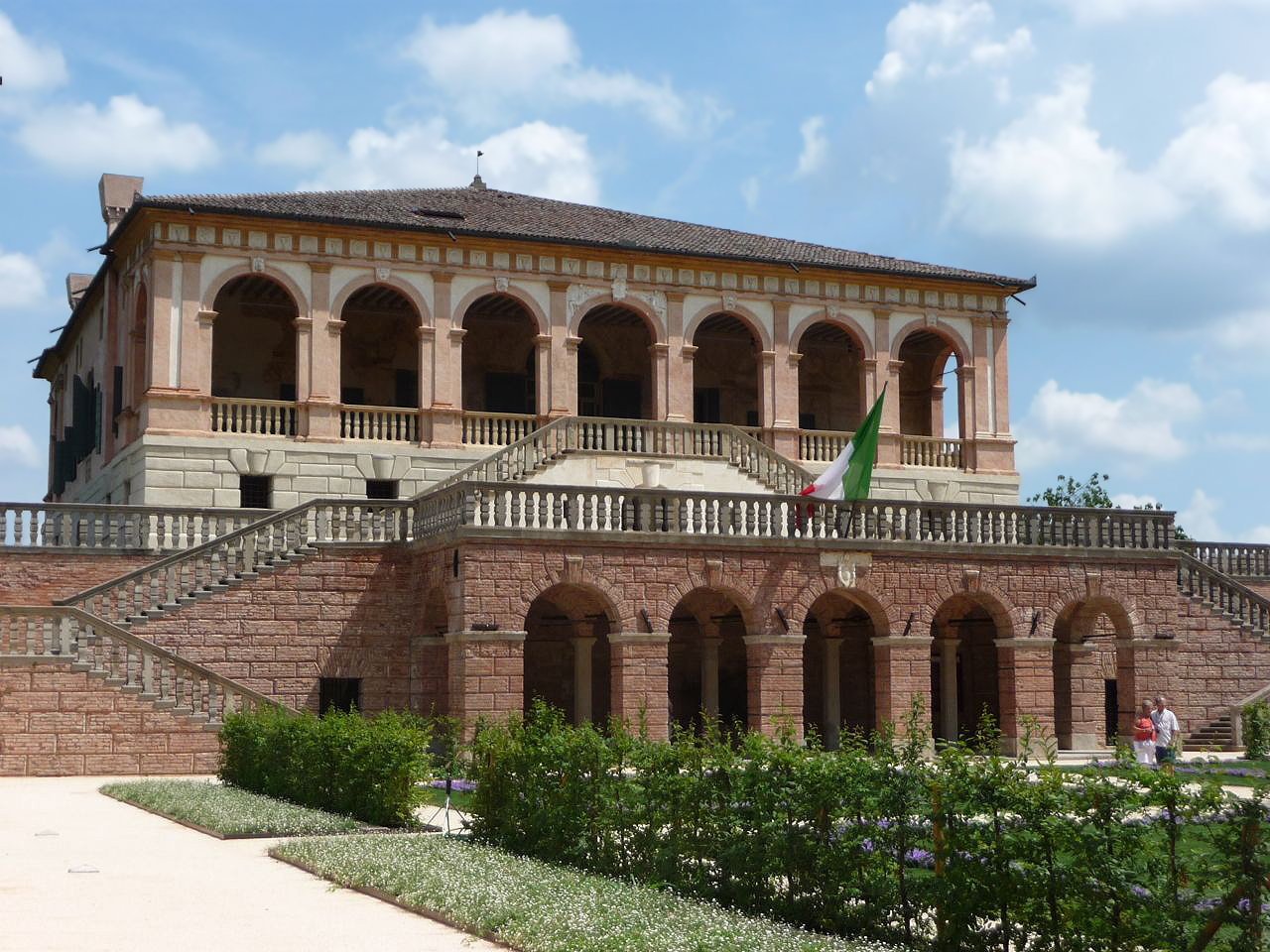
Garden façade

The Villa dei Vescovi is a Renaissance-style, rural palatial home located in the neighborhood or frazione of Luvigliano, within the city limits of Torreglia, province of Padova, region of Veneto, Italy. Initially built for the archbishops of Padua, the villa is now owned by the Fondo Ambiente Italiano (FAI), and the grounds and frescoed rooms are open to visitors and guests.

== History ==
The villa was erected between 1535–1542 by the curia of Padua, to provide a summer retreat for the archbishop. The bishop at the time was Francesco Pisani, of the aristocratic Pisani family of Venice. The commission was begun by the archbishopric's administrator from 1529 to 1537, Alvise Cornaro. The villa was designed by the architect Giovanni Maria Falconetto.

The building initially contained a rectangular courtyard with two wings with an open loggia on the ground floor. The piano nobile had an open loggia looking down to the valley. The interiors and the portico were frescoed by Lambert Sustris. In the following decades, the structure was modified by multiple architects, including Andrea da Valle (pupil of Falconetto, active here circa 1567–1577). A scenographic staircase entrance was added and the central courtyard was roofed. Finally, Vincenzo Scamozzi continued to link the villa to the gardens. Future bishops commissioned additions to the gardens and orchards.

In 1910, the bishop Luigi Pellizzo sold the property, which was by then in need of much restoration. The property for some time during the world war hosted a Discalced Carmelite nuns, but after the war, the villa became known as Villa San Domenico Savio, home of a house of religious retreats for young Catholics. In 1962, the property was sold to Vittorio Olcese, who began further restorations. In 2005, the widow and son of Vittorio donated the property to the FAI.

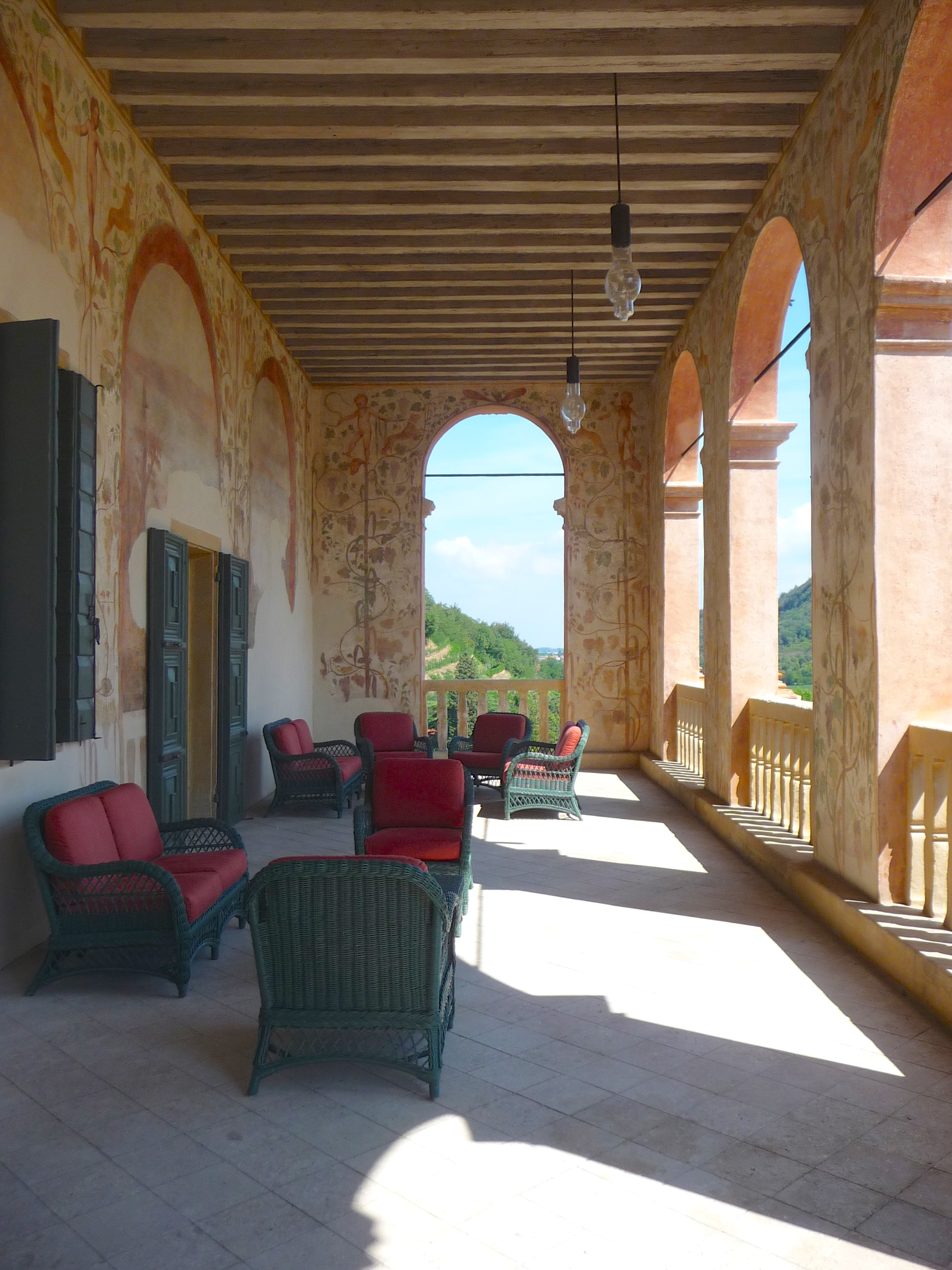
Frescoed portico

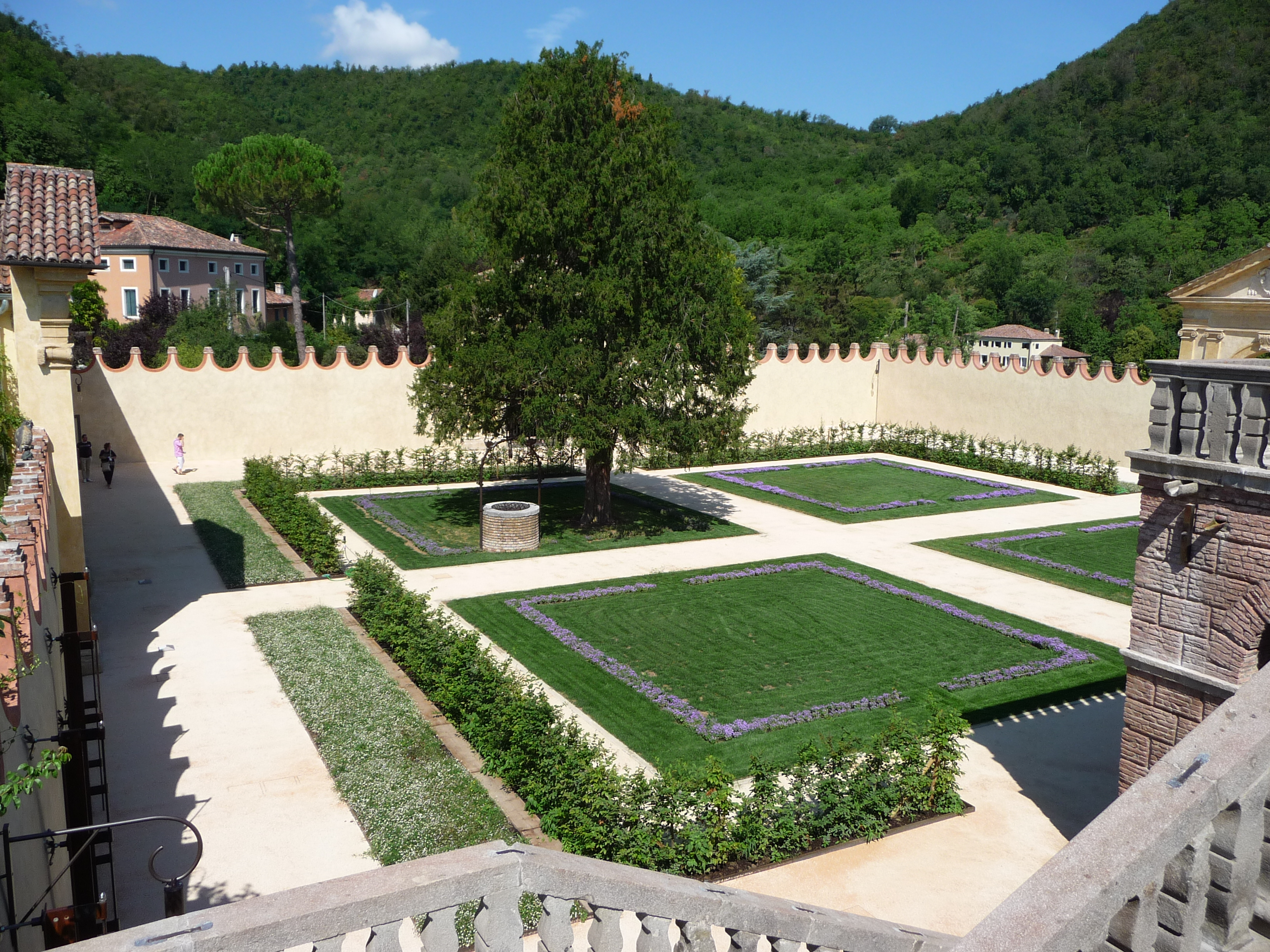
Formal garden

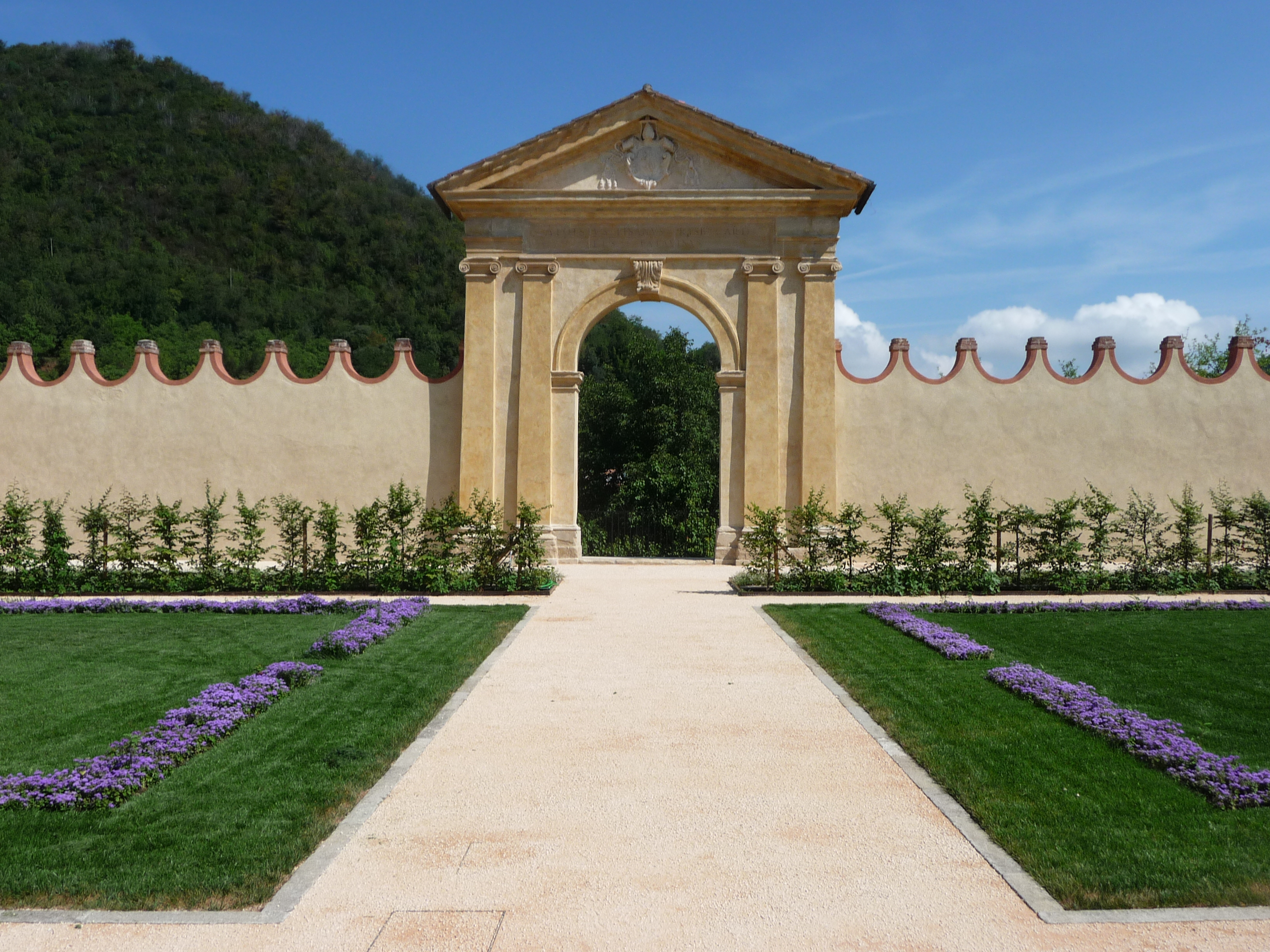
Gate

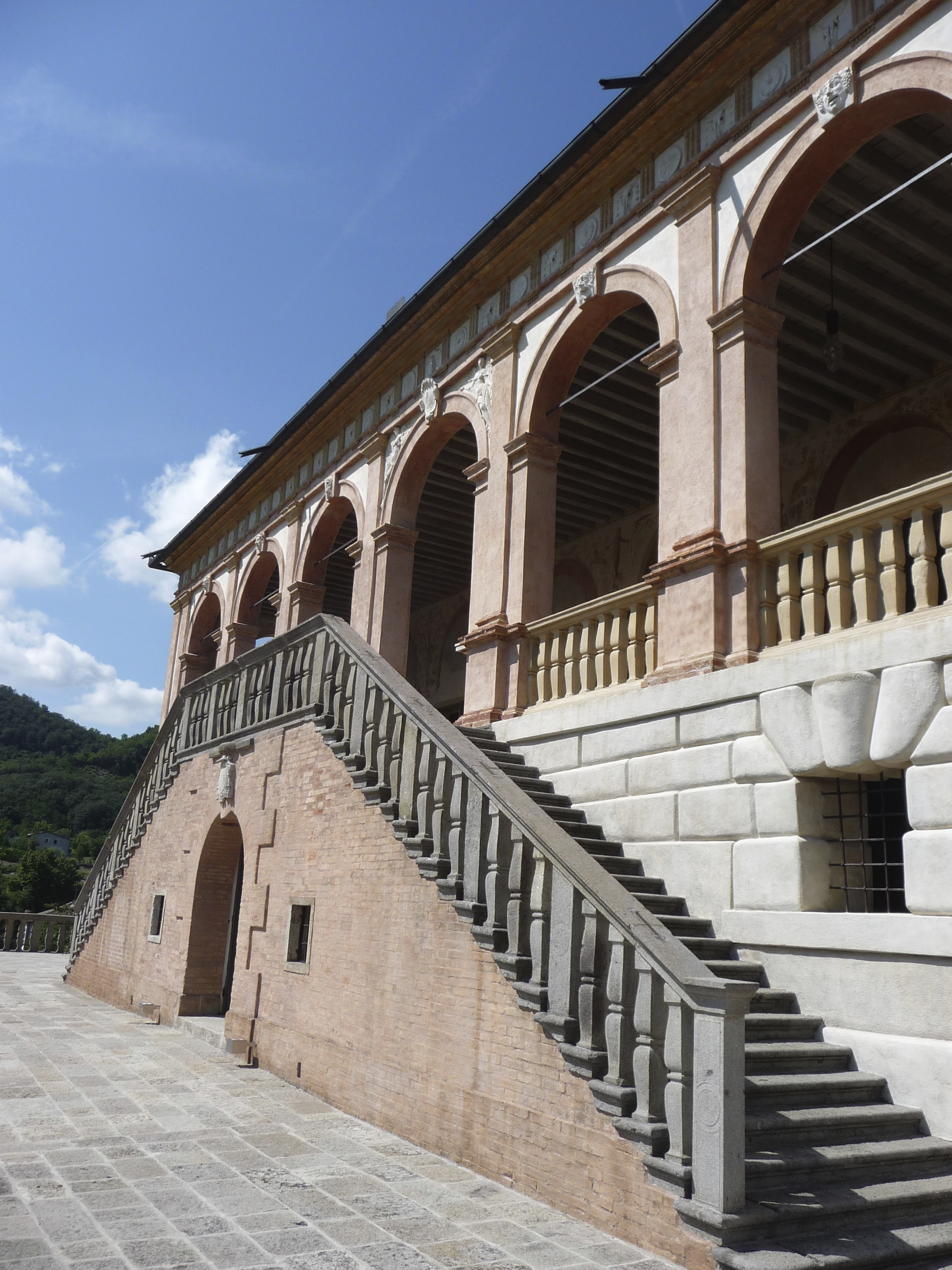
Rear façade

== See also ==
- Abano Terme tourism site
