= Torreglia =

- Comune
- Comune di Torreglia
- Location within Italy Location within Veneto
- Coordinates: 45°20′N 11°44′E
- Country: Italy
- Region: Veneto
- Province: Province of Padua (PD)

Government
  - Mayor: Filippo Legnaro (Lista Civica)

Area
  - Total: 18.8 km^{2} (7.3 sq mi)
- Elevation: 23 m (75 ft)

Population (Dec. 2004)
  - Total: 5,978
  - Density: 318/km^{2} (824/sq mi)
- Time zone: UTC+1 (CET)
  - Summer (DST): UTC+2 (CEST)
- Postal code: 35038
- Dialing code: 049
- Patron saint: Sacro Cuore di Gesù
- Saint day: Friday after the Corpus Christi

Torreglia is a comune (municipality) in the Province of Padua in the Italian Veneto region, located about 45 kilometres (28 mi) west of Venice and about 14 kilometres (9 mi) southwest of Padua. As of 31 December 2004, it had a population of 5,978 and an area of 18.8 square kilometres (7.3 mi^{2}).

Torreglia borders the following municipalities: Abano Terme, Galzignano Terme, Montegrotto Terme, Teolo. The 16th century Villa dei Vescovi, Luvigliano is located in this territory.

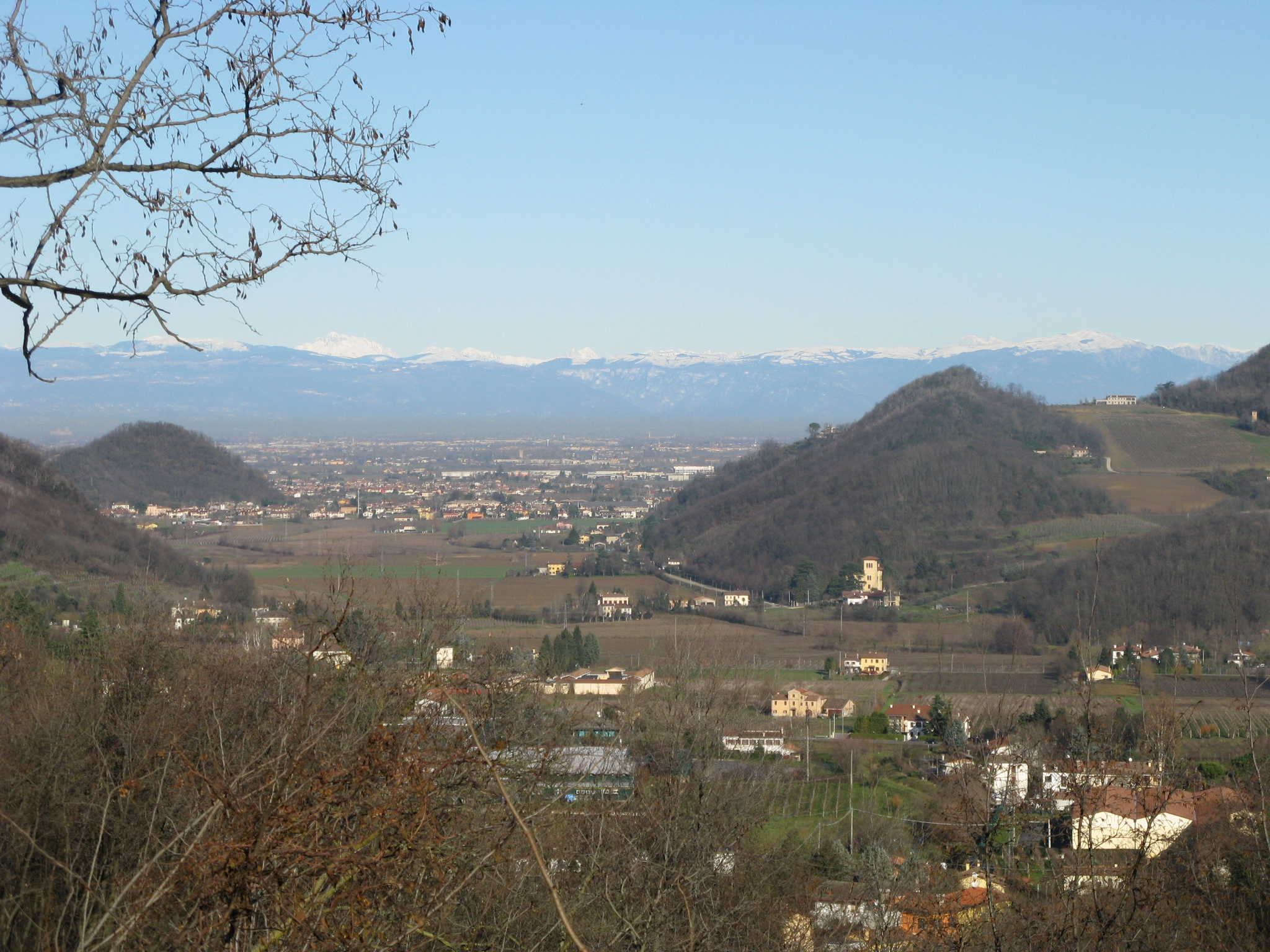
Torreglia (Veneto/Italy), seen from Torreglia Alta

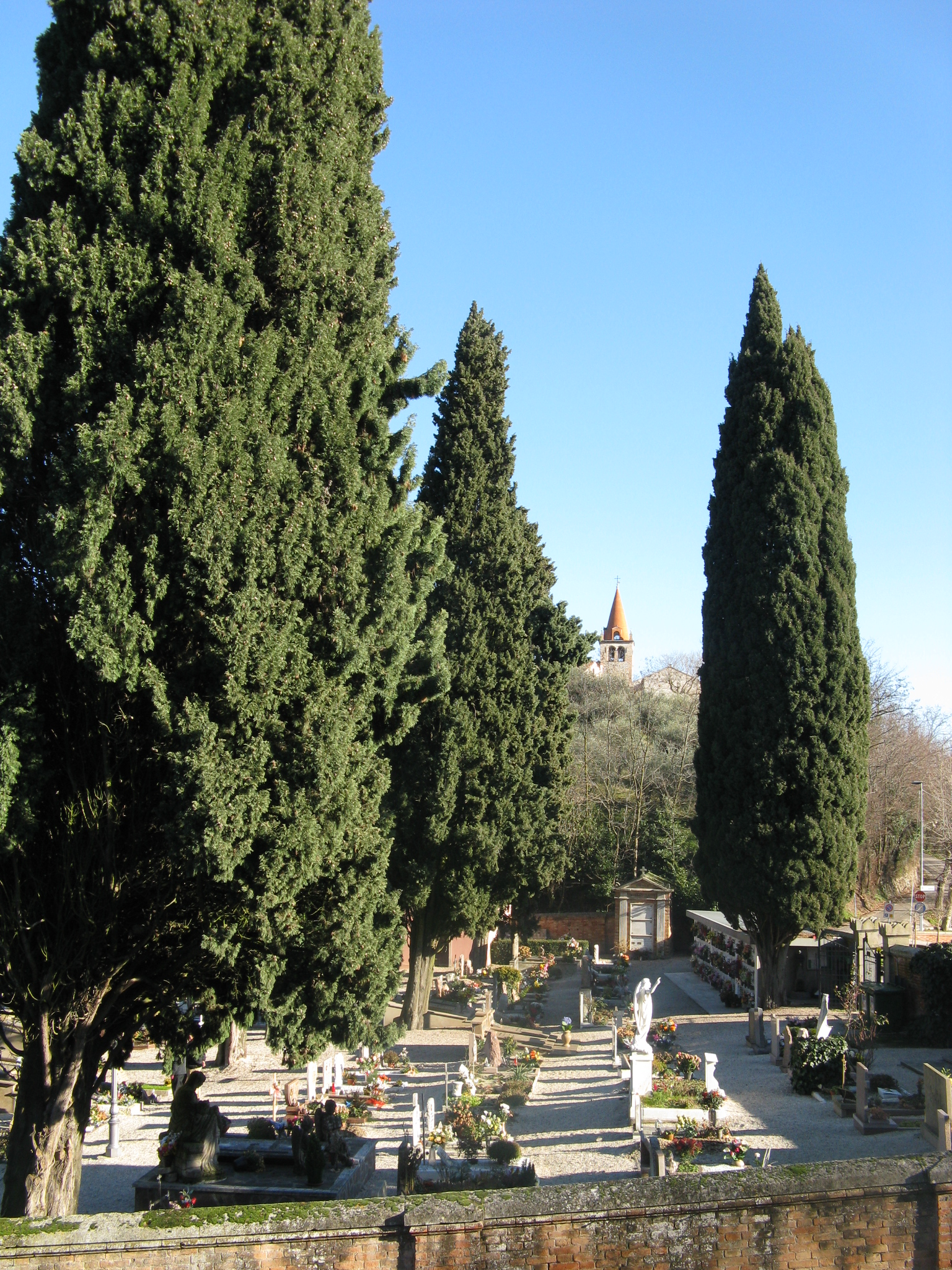
Cemetery and Church

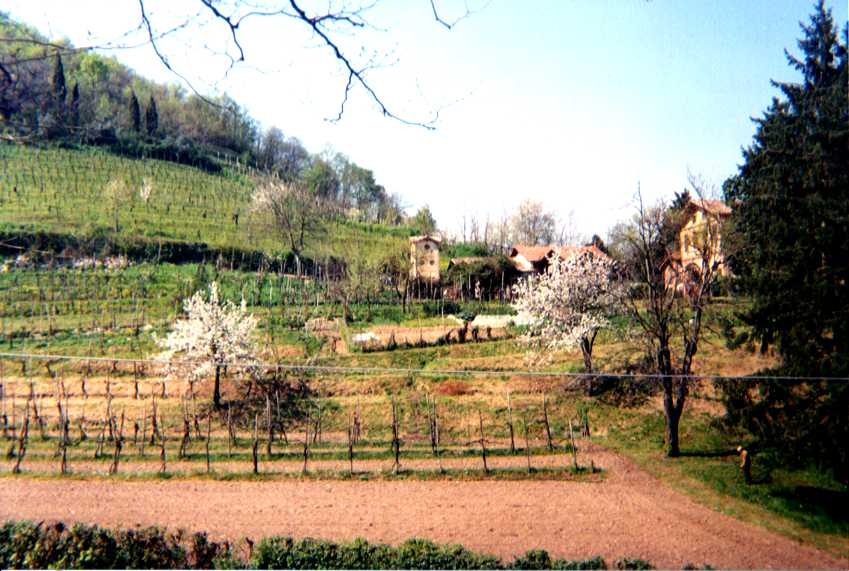
Almonds in flower

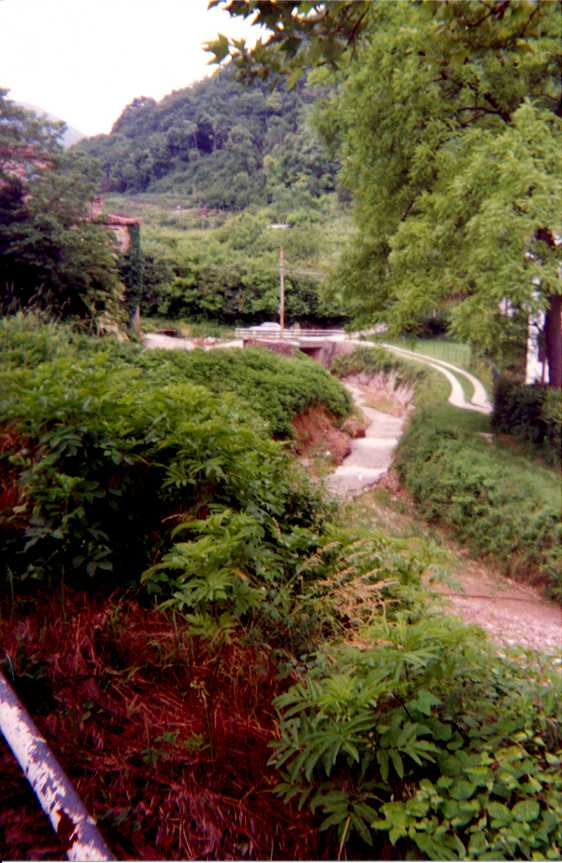
Calcina River

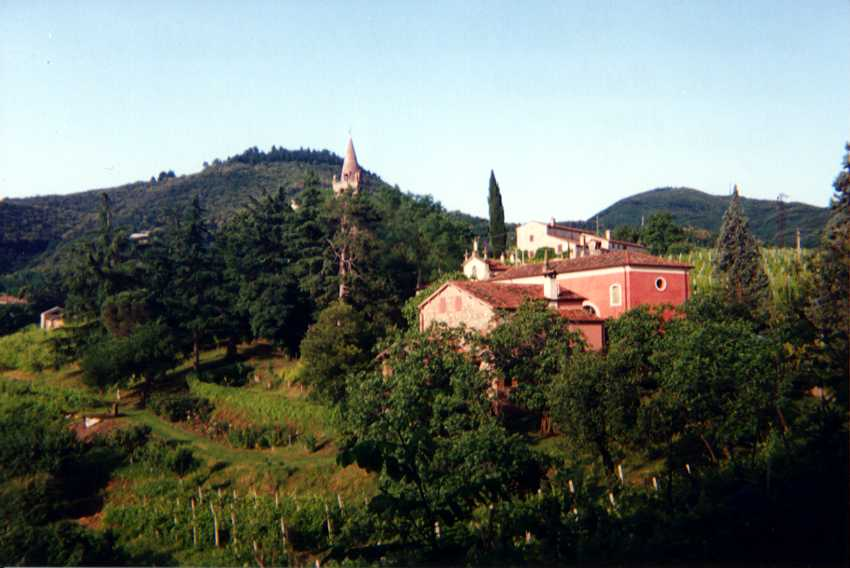
San Sabino Church

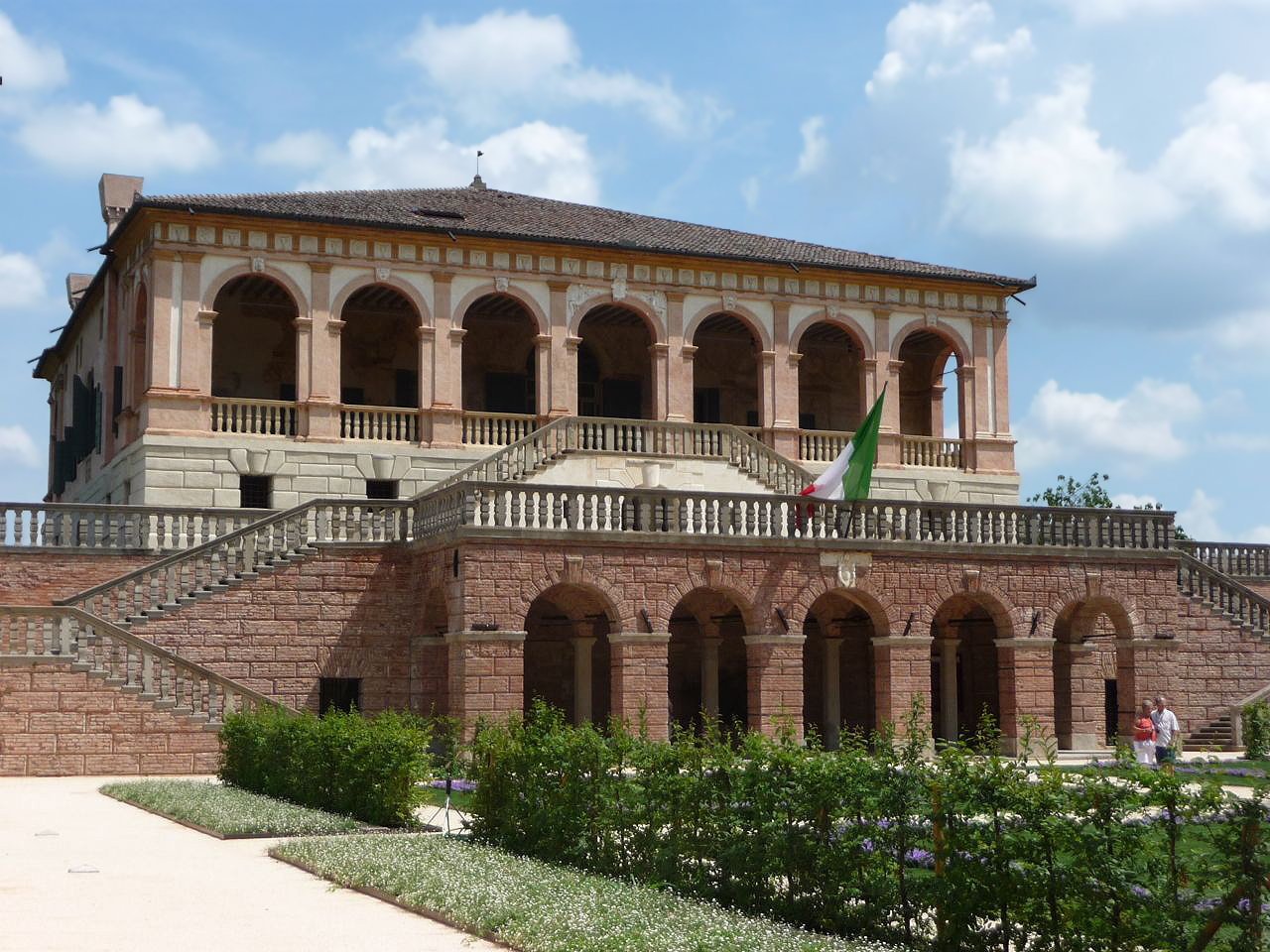
Villa dei Vescovi, Luvigliano

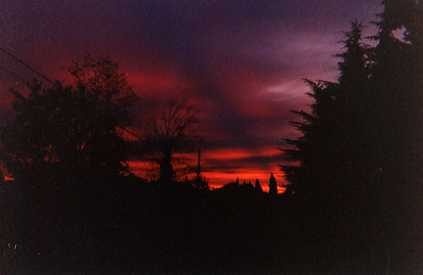
Torreglian sunset

== Demographic evolution ==
Historical population

Year	Pop.	±%
1871	2,192	—
1881	2,304	+5.1%
1901	2,574	+11.7%
1911	3,051	+18.5%
1921	3,498	+14.7%

Year	Pop.	±%
1931	3,686	+5.4%
1936	3,835	+4.0%
1951	4,261	+11.1%
1961	4,174	−2.0%
1971	4,626	+10.8%

Year	Pop.	±%
1981	5,276	+14.1%
1991	5,709	+8.2%
2001	5,880	+3.0%

Source: Data from ISTAT
