= Leonetti =

Leonetti is a surname of Italian origin. People with that name include:

- Caroline Leonetti Ahmanson (1918-2005), American fashion consultant, businesswoman and philanthropist
- Francesco Leonetti (c. 1924 - 2017), Italian poet, novelist teacher and political activist
- Giovanni Battista Leonetti (fl. 1604 – c. 1617), Italian Augustinian monk, composer, and organist
- Giovanni Battista Leonetti (engraver) (19th century), Italian engraver
- Joey Leonetti (born 1970), American soccer player
- John R. Leonetti (born 1956), American cinematographer
- Matthew F. Leonetti (born 1941), American cinematographer
- Melissa Leonetti (born 1982), American field hockey player
- Phil Leonetti (born 1953), American mobster
- Tommy Leonetti (1929-1979), American singer-songwriter and actor

== See also ==
- Lionetti
