= Lionetti =

Lionetti is an Italian surname. Notable people with the surname include:

- Edoardo Lionetti (1862–1912), Italian sculptor
- Pia Lionetti (born 1987), Italian archer
- Ben and Joe Lionetti, musicians

== See also ==
- Leonetti
- Tommy Leonetti, born Lionetti
