= Martino Ghisi =

Italian physician

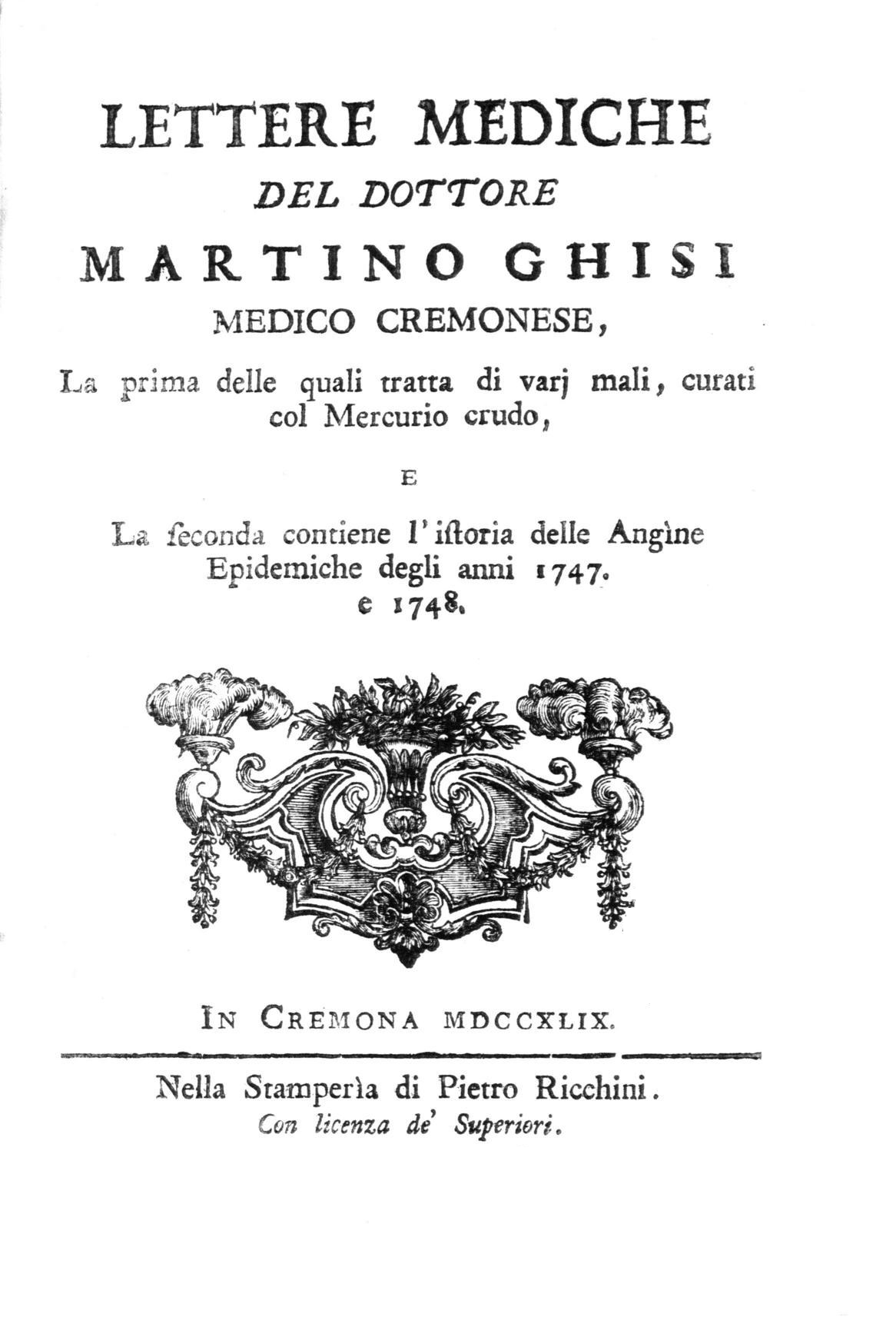
Title page of Lettere mediche (1749)

Martino Ghisi (11 November 1715 – 11 May 1794) was an Italian physician who worked in Cremona. He is best known for being the first to detail the clinical signs and anatomical changes related to diphtheria which he published privately in a pamphlet.

== Biography ==
Ghisi was born in Soresina and studied medicine under Paolo Valcarenghi. After his studies in Florence at the Santa Maria Nuova hospital where he studied under Antonio Cocchi (1695-1758), Giuseppe Maria Saverio Bertini (1695-1756), and Angelo Nannoni (1715-1790), he returned to Cremona where he practiced. In 1745 he studied diseases of livestock and wrote a report to Francesco Roncalli Parolino (1692-1769) who published it in 1747. In 1749 he reported on malignant angina, in fact diphtheria, comparing it with livestock diseases. Ghisi described the climate and conditions when the epidemic occurred and then described paralysis of the velum palatinum and the tumefaction of the submaxillary glands. He also examined changes in the bronchi, pulmonary edema and the strain it caused to the right side of the heart. Ghisi called the pharyngeal form of diphtheria as Angina strepitosa perfida mortalis and compared it with the tracheal form. He noted that in children, there was tube-shaped false membrane in the trachea that was coughed up. This was published in his only published work - Lettere mediche del Dottor M. Ghisi which also included a section on the use of mercury for treatments.

Ghisi died in Cremona and is buried in the Church of Sant'Agostino. A bust is held at the University of Prague.
