= The Martyrdom of Saint George =

Painting by Paolo Veronese

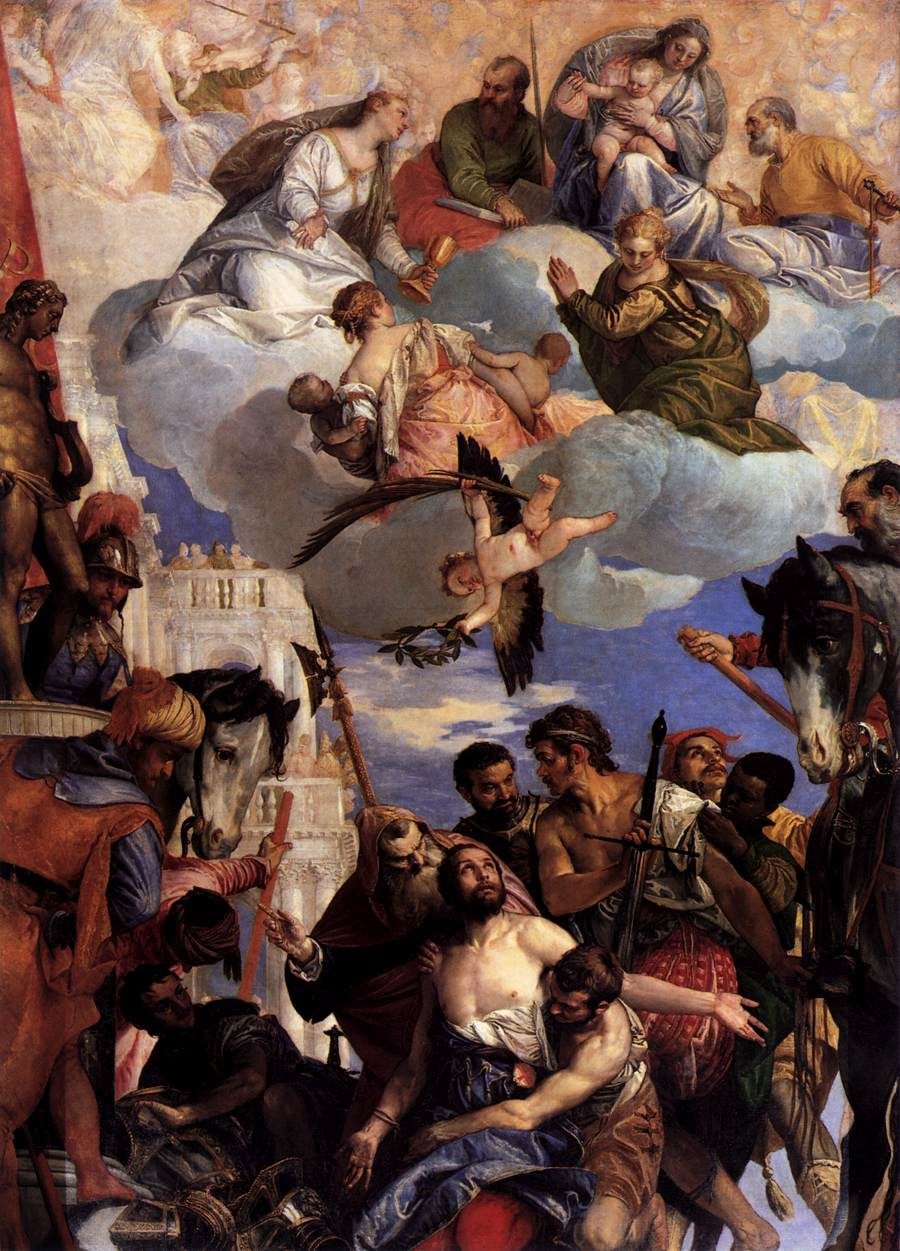
- Artist: Paolo Veronese
- Year: 1566
- Medium: oil on canvas
- Dimensions: 426 cm × 305 cm (168 in × 120 in)
- Location: San Giorgio in Braida, Verona

The Martyrdom of Saint George is an oil-on-canvas painting by Paolo Veronese, from 1566. It was produced for the high altar of the church of San Giorgio in Braida, in Verona, dedicated to Saint George, where it still hangs. It was created in Verona, the artist's birthplace, whilst he was back there to marry Elena, daughter of his teacher Antonio Badile.

In 1732 the Veronese scholar Scipione Maffei recorded that a few years earlier a decision was taken "to unpick the canvas of the large painting by Paolo [Veronese], which was then badly restored", though he does not state why this happened or what happened to the work afterwards, despite calling the decision "a heinous crime" After the Veronese Easter it and Saint Barnabas Healing the Sick were both seized from the church by the French occupiers on 18 May and folded up for transport, arriving in Paris on 6 August. There it was stated to be "in good condition".

The Austrian Empire took custody of the painting on 27 September 1815 after Napoleon's fall and on 15 March the following year it returned to its original church in Verona after another restoration, with uncertain results. The canvas was again detached to be sent to Florence during the First World War to save it from bombardment, returning to Verona after the war. A large tear occurred on the saint's cloak during transport and it was again restored under the Veronese scholar Attilio Motta. Other important restorations of the work occurred in 1987 and 2014.

== Bibliography (in Italian) ==
- Magani, Fabrizio; Falezza, Giulia; Scardellato, Chiara (December 2018). Paolo Veronese : nuovi studi e ricerche (in Italian). Venezia. ISBN 978-88-297-0045-5. OCLC 1089224072.
- Pignatti, Terisio (1976). Veronese. Vol. 1. Venezia: Alfieri.
- Viviani, Giuseppe Franco (2002). Chiese di Verona (in Italian). Verona: Società cattolica di assicurazione. OCLC 799140537.
