= Sant'Agostino, Cremona =

Italian gothic-style Roman Catholic church

Coordinates: 45°8′6.6″N 10°1′9.5″E

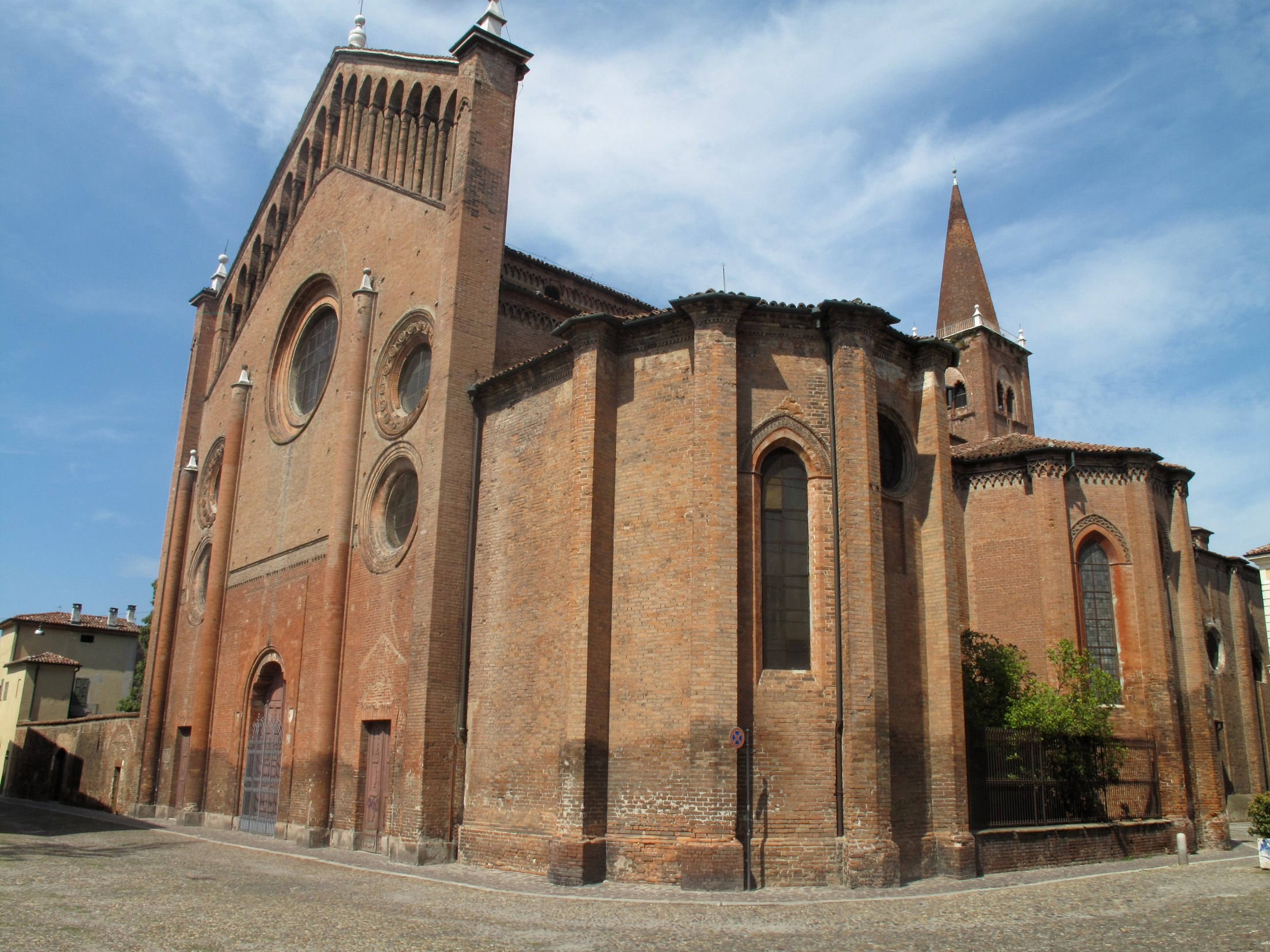
Sant'Agostino, Cremona

Sant'Agostino is a gothic-style, Roman Catholic church located in Cremona, region of Lombardy, Italy.

== History ==
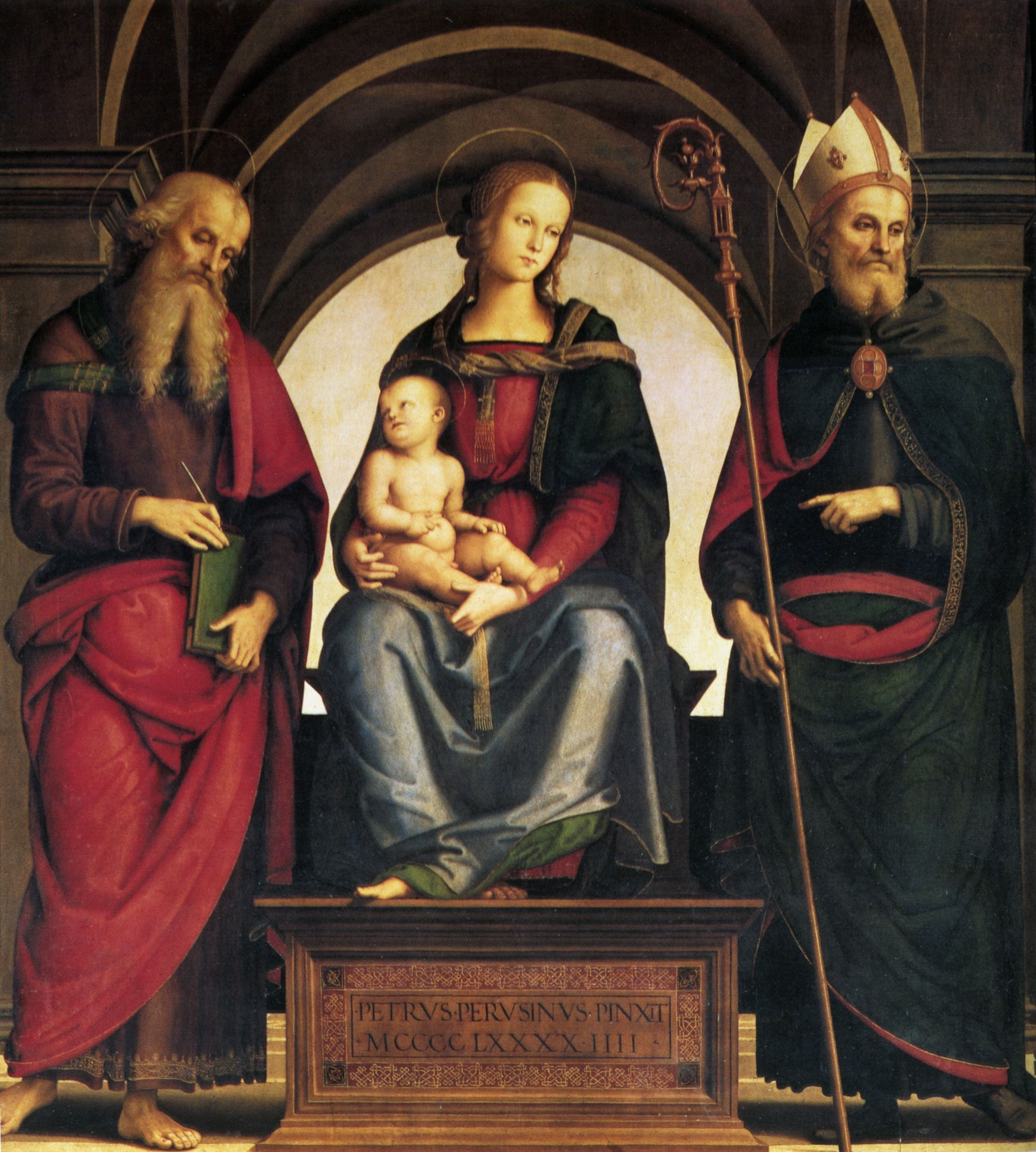
Perugino altarpiece

The church we see incorporated a prior church of San Giacomo in Braida, and was erected between 1339 and 1345. (Note: A distinct San Giorgio in Braida is found in Verona.) It was once attached to a monastery of Augustinian monks.

Further refurbishments of the interior occurred from 1553 to 1737. Between 1553 and 1559 the interior of the church was renovated, creating the vaults to cover the three aisles, thus hiding the original timber roof from sight.

The church acquired extensive decoration. The main altarpiece is by Andrea Mainardi and depicts The Redeemer gives his blood to the Doctors of the Church (1594).

The Cappella della Passione di Cristo is the second chapel on the right, and contains a statuary group depicting the Passion of Christ (1666) by Giovanni Battista Barberini.

The third chapel on the right is the Cappella Cavalcabò. In 1447, Giovanni Cavalcabo had the chapel decorated. The work is attributed to Bonifacio Bembo. It includes a fresco from the ducal chapel.

In 1460, Bembo was commissioned by Francesco Sforza to paint a portrait of him and his wife. The portraits originally hung on pillars outside of the chapel of SS Daria and Grisante. They were then transferred onto canvas and moved inside the chapel itself where they both hang today.

In 1490 Pietro Perugino painted a panel altarpiece Madonna and Child between Saints John Evangelist and Augustine.

Giovanni Battista Leonetti was appointed organist at the church in 1617.
