= Paolo Valcarenghi =

Italian physician (d. 1780)

Paolo Valcarenghi (died 1780) was an Italian physician who worked in Cremona. He was prolific in his medical writings, often based on his erudite knowledge of ancient classic medical texts in Latin and Greek.

== Biography ==
Valcarenghi was born in Cremona. He became the primary professor of Medicine at the University of Pavia and taught at the Scuole Palatine of Milan. He was admitted as a member of numerous academic and medical societies in Italy, including the Collegi de Medici di Milano, Cremona, Ferrara and Brescia.

Among his works are:

- De aortae aneurysmate osdervationes binae cum animadvesionibus (1741) Cremona
- Ad Clarissimus Virum Franciscum Comirem Roncallum Parolinum & Diatriba Epistolaris (1747) Brescia
- Dell'uso e dell'abuso del Rabarbaro unito alla ChinaChina. Dissertazione epistolare, (1748) Cremona
- Rifflessioni medico-practiche sopra la lettera familiare del Docto Ignazio Pedattri medico Cremonese, (1749) Cremona on the above.
- Discorsi due Epistolari sopra una terra salina purgante di fresco nel Piemonte scoperta (1757) Turin
- Ebenbitar Tractarum de mali limoniis Commentarioa (1758) regarding the writings of the healing properties of lemons by the Andalusian Muslim physician, Ibn al-Baytar (1197–1248), written along with the fellow Cremonese physician, Martino Ghisi
- De potenti, vel impotentia ad genereandum ob virulentam gonorrhoeam in Titii circumstanstiis considerandam, (1749) Milan
- Dissertatio medica epistolaris de Virgine Cremonense, quae per plures annos maleficiata fuit (1746) Cremona. This dissertation was about a young female who was able to putatively spontaneously vomit stones, needles, iron pieces and glass, and who was deemed a witch. Valcarenghi attributed it to more natural phenomena. He was opposed by a priest and Andrea Fromond.
