= San Giorgio in Braida, Verona =

Roman Catholic church in Verona, Veneto, Italy

Coordinates: 45.4489°N 10.9959°E

Church of San Giorgio in Braida
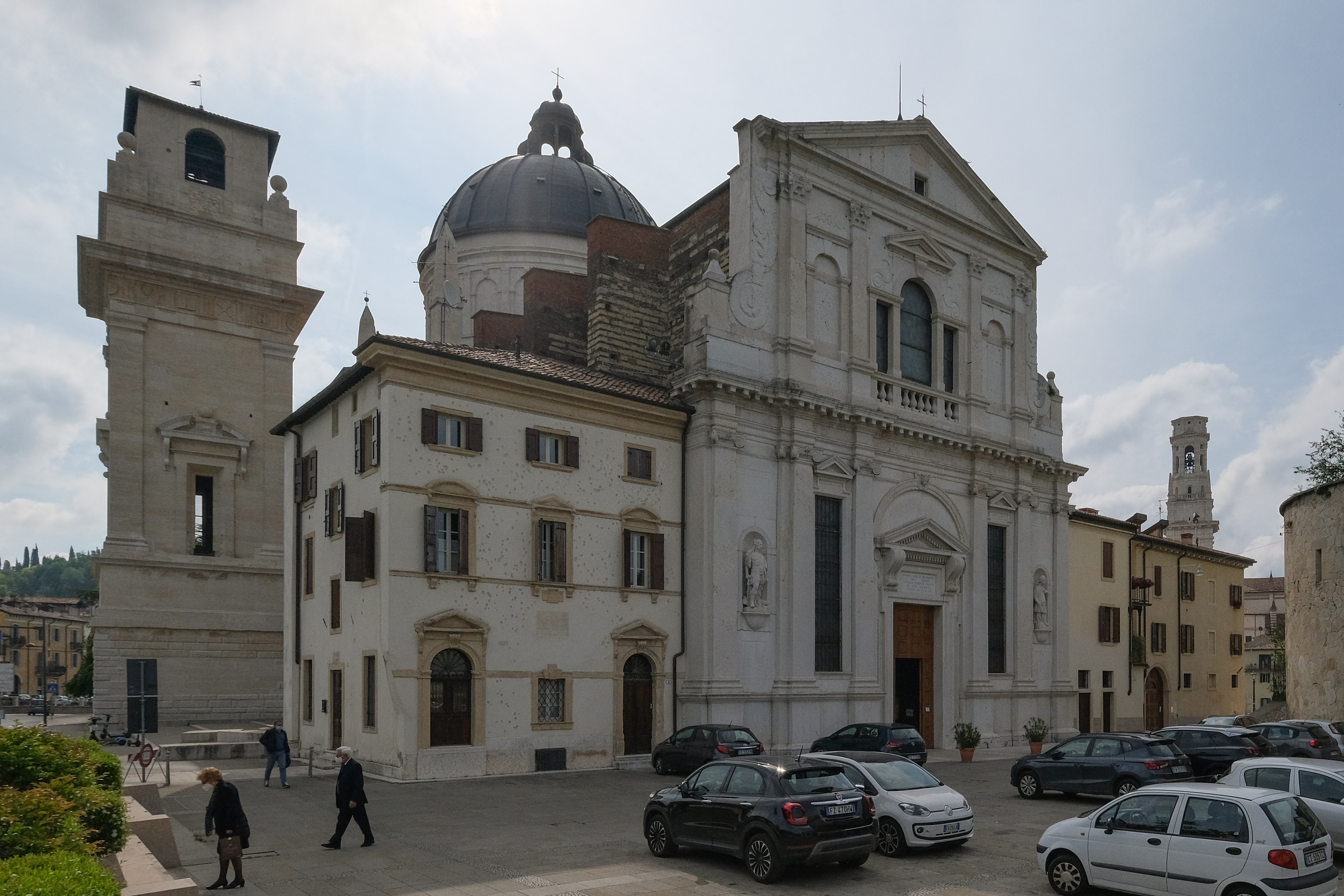

Religion
- Affiliation: Roman Catholic

Location
- Location: Verona, Italy
- Interactive map of Church of San Giorgio in Braida

Architecture
- Architect: Michele Sanmicheli (dome)
- Type: Church
- Style: Renaissance
- Groundbreaking: 16th century

The Church of San Giorgio in Braida is a Catholic place of worship in Verona, located in the Veronetta district, between the Adige River to the south and Borgo Trento to the north. Its origins trace back to Pietro Cadalo, a future antipope, who in 1046 decided to alienate some of his assets to establish a Benedictine monastery under the oversight of the Bishop of Verona. Between the 12th and 13th centuries, the monastery experienced a period of significant economic and spiritual prosperity. Only faint traces remain of the original Romanesque building, likely rebuilt after the devastating earthquake of 1117, such as the base of the bell tower visible on the left wall. Following a period of decline under the Della Scala family, in 1442, the complex was transferred to the Congregation of San Giorgio in Alga, which initiated the construction of the current Renaissance structure. After the congregation was suppressed, in 1669, the complex was sold to the nuns of Santa Maria in Reggio to fund the War of Candia. With the closure of the convent in 1807, the parish of San Giorgio also ceased to exist, and the church became an oratory dependent on Santo Stefano. During the Austrian domination, the construction of new fortifications in 1837 led to the demolition of much of the complex. On March 2, 1874, San Giorgio in Braida was re-established as an independent parish, and in 1938, it underwent a series of restoration works that included the partial reconstruction of the 16th-century cloister.

The identity of the architect who designed the complex is uncertain, though Francesco da Castello is the most widely credited. Many attribute a contribution to Paolo Farinati for the design of the facade, while the renowned Veronese architect Michele Sanmicheli is credited with the construction of the majestic dome and the conception of the bell tower, which was later continued but left unfinished by his relative and disciple Bernardino Brugnoli. The interior spaces of the church are organized in a single nave with eight lateral chapels, four on each side, each featuring a white marble altar with a wooden altarpiece. Between the nave and the presbytery, accessible via a balustrade, there is a slightly defined transept topped by the dome.

Many observers, including Scipione Maffei and Goethe, praised the numerous Renaissance artworks housed there. The lateral chapels are adorned with works by artists such as Giovanni Francesco Caroto, Domenico Brusasorci, Pasquale Ottino, Girolamo dai Libri, Sigismondo de Stefani, and Francesco Montemezzano, while beneath the choir loft is Madonna and Child with Saints by Moretto. Above the main entrance is a Baptism of Christ by Tintoretto, while in the presbytery, Paolo Farinati and Felice Brusasorci painted the two large canvases, Multiplication of the Loaves and Fishes and The Manna in the Desert, respectively. The Martyrdom of Saint George, a 1564 work by Paolo Veronese, is displayed in the semi-dome.

== Origin of the name "in Braida" ==
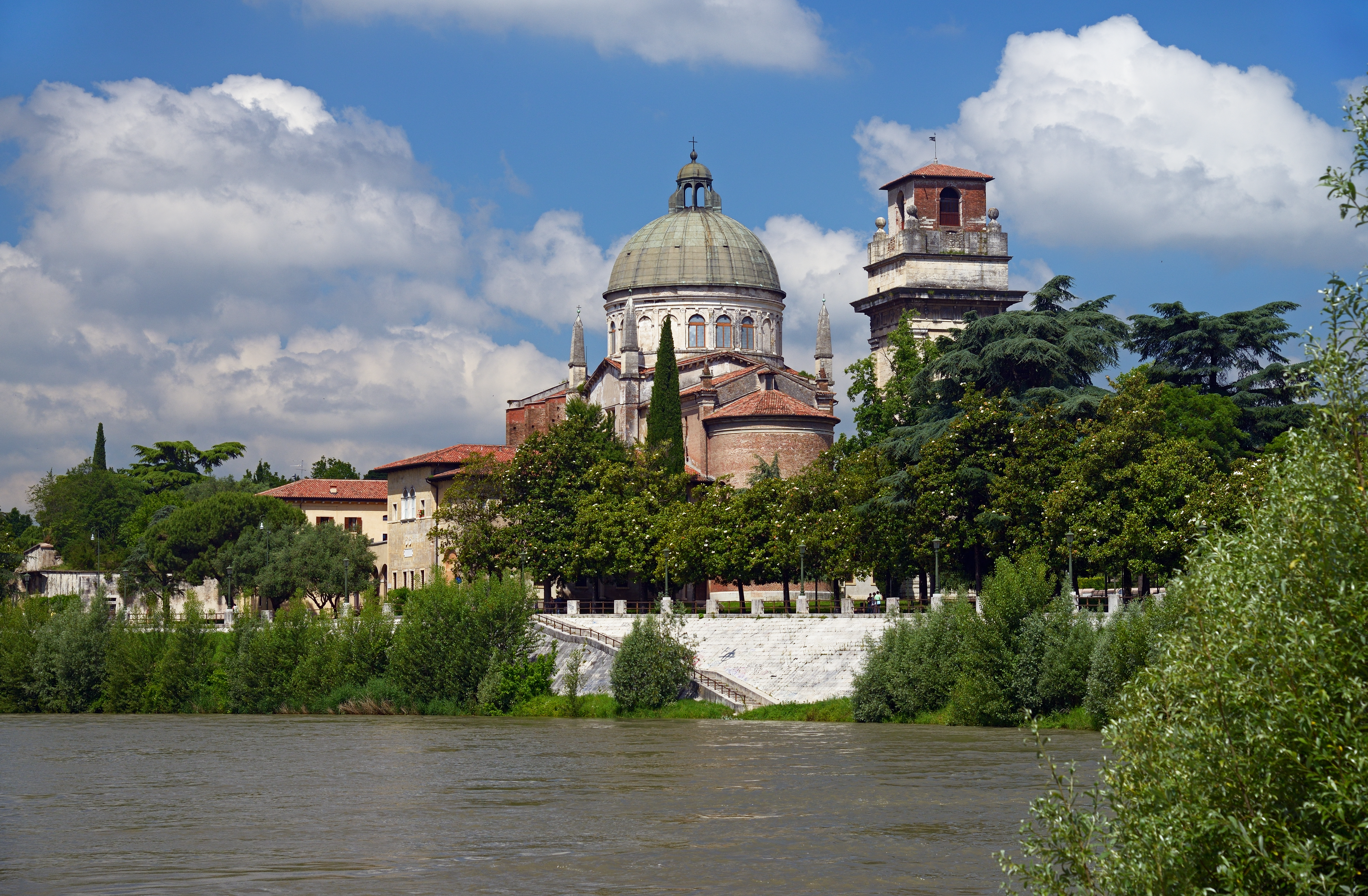
San Giorgio in Braida before the 2018–2021 restorations of the dome and bell tower.

The area where the church stands was once called prato dominico (literally, "Meadow of the Treasury") or pradonego, as it was located outside the walls of Verona. The term "braida" comes from the Lombardic words "brei" or "breit," meaning "enclosed meadow." When the monastery was founded, the meadow areas outside the city walls were known as "braide."

== History ==
=== Origins ===
The origins of the Church of San Giorgio in Braida date back to the Middle Ages. The earliest documents related to it are preserved in the archives of the San Giorgio parish, the Santo Stefano parish, and the Venetian Nunciature collection at the Vatican Secret Archives. Although some historians suggest that a monastery housing a group of nuns existed here as early as 780, its certain establishment is dated to 1046, when the Veronese noble Pietro Cadalo, then newly elected Bishop of Parma and later antipope, decided to found a Benedictine monastery dedicated to Saint George in his hometown at his own expense. The chosen site was a plot of land in prato domjic, located outside the Roman walls, on the left bank of the Adige River, opposite the cathedral. The land purchase agreement, involving the exchange of certain properties, was drawn up on April 23; the following day, Cadalo allocated additional assets, while retaining their usufruct for his lifetime, for the construction and endowment of the monastery, which was to be placed under the jurisdiction of the Bishop of Verona. In 1052, Emperor Henry III, through the intercession of his wife Agnes of Poitou, granted his personal protection to the monastery.

=== The years of prosperity and the Romanesque building ===
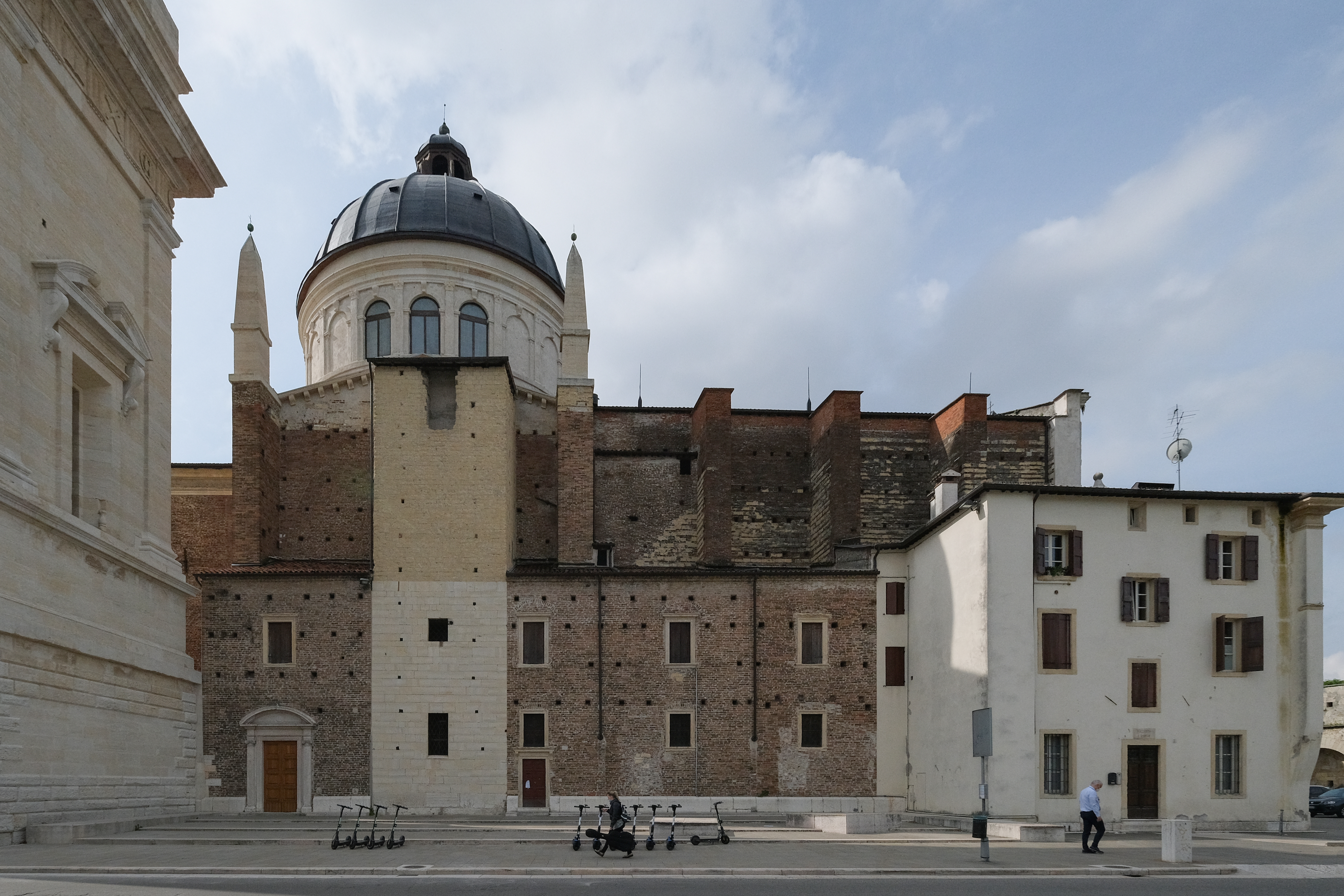
The old Romanesque bell tower (in lighter color, made entirely of stone) along the northern wall of the church.

Surviving documents indicate that by 1077, the monastery housed a community of priests, a schola e plebe Sancti Georgi, alongside a community of nuns. At that time, the Church of San Giorgio held the status of a pieve, a title it maintained only briefly. In 1112, Bishop Uberto dissolved both communities, entrusting the complex to a new collegiate of priests. This collegiate gained significant prestige, as evidenced by the diplomas and privileges it received in 1123 and 1127 from Bishop Bernardo and in 1132 from Pope Innocent II. Although there is no definitive evidence, it is highly likely that the building at the time was severely damaged during the 1117 Verona earthquake, which caused widespread destruction in the city and province, and that its transfer to the collegiate coincided with a period of intense rebuilding. Little is known about this initial Romanesque complex except for a few remnants, such as part of the bell tower’s shaft. This shaft is now visible, though it is incorporated into the left side of the church. Another remnant is a section of the outer wall of the former rectory, which is preserved in the 16th-century cloister.

The collegiate period was a time of great economic and spiritual prosperity for the monastery. In 1121, Pellegrino served as prior and adopted the Rule of Saint Augustine. He also acquired numerous lands in Valpolicella, particularly in Arbizzano and Novare, and founded a hospital. By the mid-12th century, the priorate passed to Viviano. During this time, the monastery received further privileges from Emperor Frederick Barbarossa in 1155 and from Pope Alexander III in 1164, as well as personal commendations for Viviano. Numerous documents concerning donations pro rimedio anima and depositum contracts in favor of the monastery demonstrate its high reputation and trust among the people of Verona.

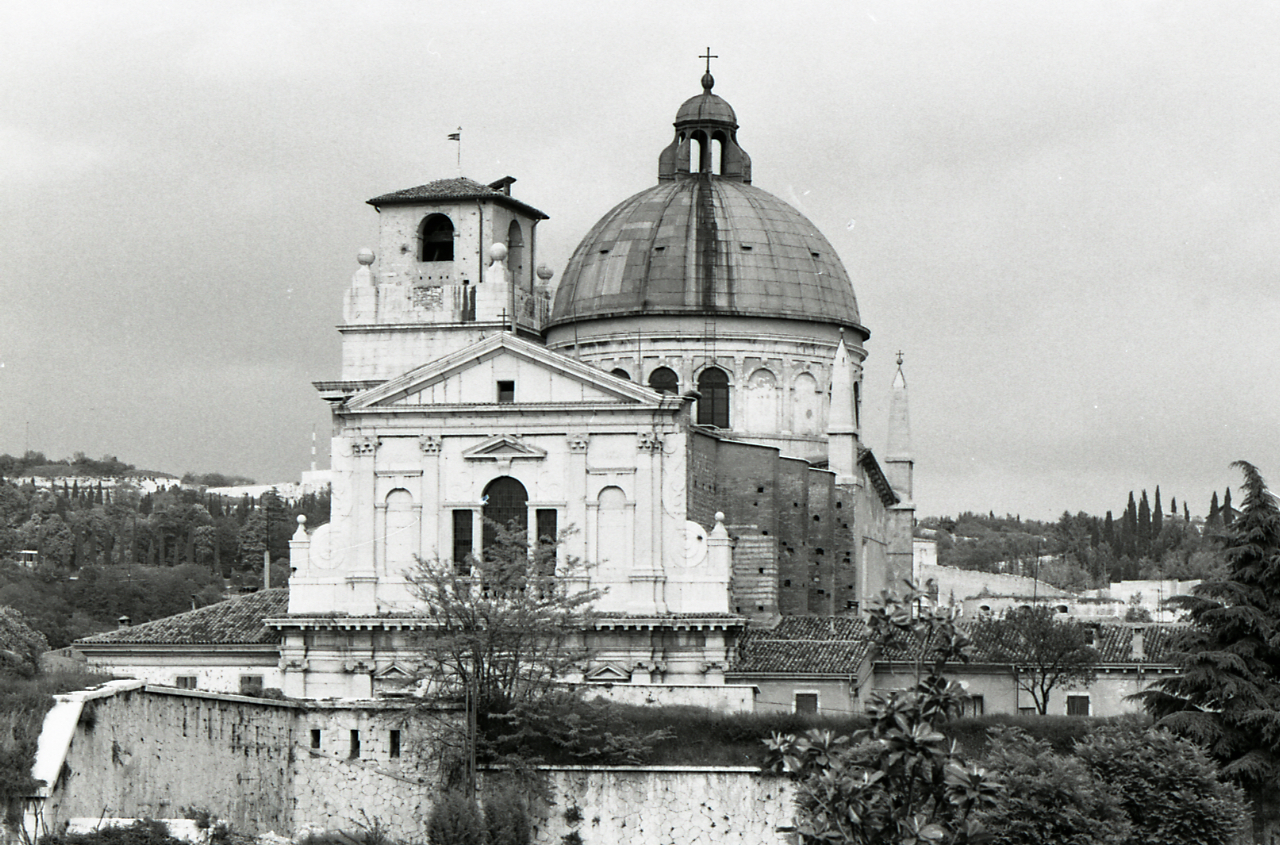
Photograph by Paolo Monti from 1972, showing the upper part of the church; in the foreground, the Austrian walls (specifically the Rondella di San Giorgio) are visible.

In 1177, Gerardo succeeded Viviano as prior, followed by Domenico, another Viviano in 1218, and finally Bernardo. Under Bernardo, a significant event occurred within the monastery’s rectory: the theft of a silver cross containing a relic of the True Cross, typically placed atop a pole on the city’s carroccio. This act led to riots, resulting in Bernardo’s removal and replacement by the illegitimate Diotiguardi. This was not the only notorious event recorded by chroniclers. In 1256, Ezzelino III da Romano massacred Paduan soldiers within the monastery’s vegetable garden, with Rolandino de’ Passaggeri reporting that they “perished by hunger, thirst, cold, hanging, sword, and fire.” Estimates of the victims vary; Rolandino claims 11,000, while the Paduan Pietro Gerardo cites around 2,000, a figure considered more credible given Padua’s population at the time, though likely still exaggerated. Amid these tragic events, a positive note was the establishment of a monastery library; a 13th-century catalog lists manuscripts by authors including Peter Abelard, Saint Augustine, Saint Ambrose, Bede the Venerable, Saint Bernard of Clairvaux, Isidore of Seville, and Prosper of Aquitaine.

=== The Scaliger period and decline ===
After the Della Scala family assumed power in Verona, they constructed a new city wall that enclosed the monastery. Recognizing its wealth, the Scaligers appointed their relatives, who were often illegitimate children, as canons. Some became abbots, such as Giuseppe della Scala (illegitimate son of Alberto I della Scala) in 1284 and Aimonte della Scala in 1353. This meddling presence had a detrimental effect on the monastery's spiritual life, resulting in a marked decline. After the Scaliger rule ended, during the brief period of Gian Galeazzo Visconti’s governance, the monastery was led by Philip of Alençon, Patriarch of Aquileia, as commendatory abbot. Following Verona’s devotion to Venice in 1409, this role passed to Gabriele Condulmer, Bishop of Siena and future Pope Eugene IV. At this time, adherence to the Rule of Saint Augustine ceased.

=== The canons of San Giorgio in Alga and the Renaissance transformation ===
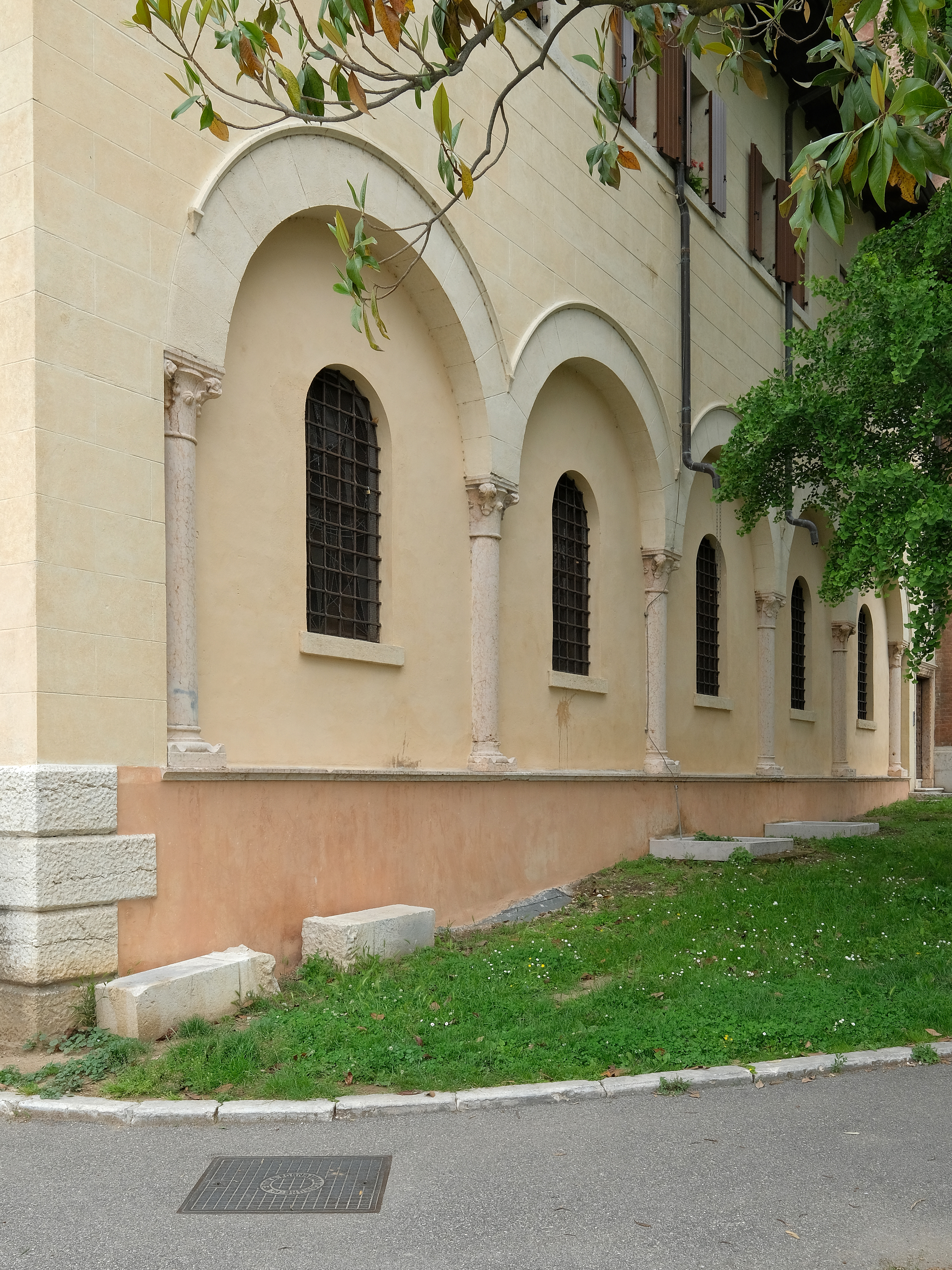
Remnants of the former 15th-century cloister; the remains of one arm along the eastern wall of the building, next to the apse, are visible, with its openings later sealed.

The year 1442 marked a turning point for the monastery, as it was transferred to the secular clergy of the Canons Regular of San Giorgio in Alga, a wealthy religious congregation with extensive landholdings in the Verona province. During this period, it was common for religious orders to settle in Verona’s monasteries. For example, in 1443, the Benedictines of Santa Giustina arrived at the Monastery of Santi Nazaro e Celso, and the following year, the Olivetans were assigned to the Church of Santa Maria in Organo. Concurrently with the arrival of the San Giorgio in Alga congregation, Maffeo Contarini, later Patriarch of Venice, was appointed rector. Thanks to this affluent congregation, work began to transform the previous structure into the current Renaissance church, with construction completed around the mid-17th century.

Based on archival research by the Veronese scholar Giovanni Battista Biancolini, 1447 was traditionally cited as the start date for the new Renaissance complex. However, a document indicates that on October 4, 1504, Mattia Ugoni, Bishop of Famagusta and former vicar bishop in Verona, laid: “primarium lapidem quadrangularem … in medio fundamento circuli capelle maioris fabricandae in ecclesia monasterij … manibus propriis astante populi multitudine” (a square cornerstone in the center of the foundation of the main chapel to be built in the monastery church, with his own hands in the presence of a large crowd). Construction likely began earlier, as scholar Girolamo Murari dalla Corte noted that the building was most active between 1480 and 1531. In any case, the large monastic complex had already been established by 1501, as it is clearly recognizable in the painting Crucifixion by Michele da Verona, created that year and now housed at the Pinacoteca di Brera.

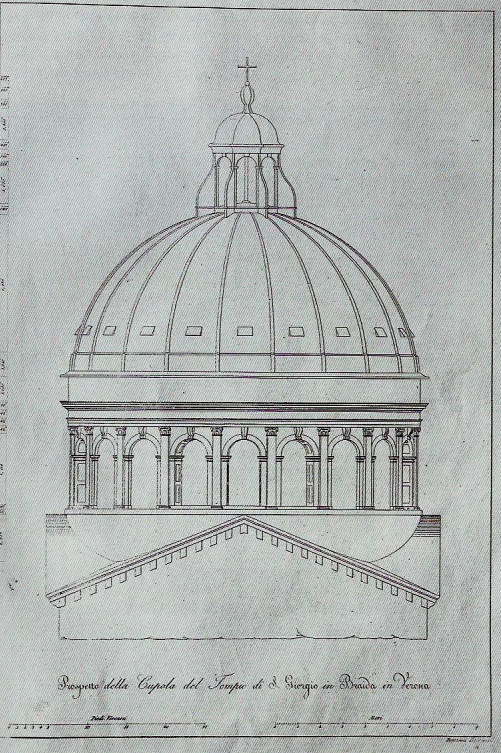
Prospectus of the dome designed in 1832 by Francesco Ronzani and Girolamo Luciolli.

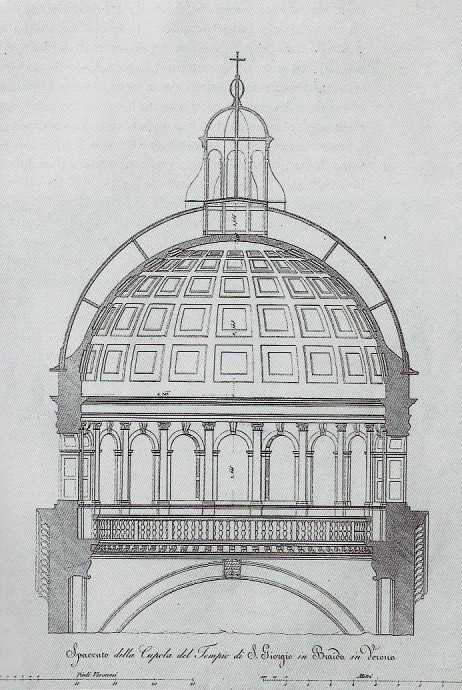
Section of the dome designed in 1832 by Francesco Ronzani and Girolamo Luciolli.

There is no certainty about the architect in charge, though many consider Francesco da Castello the most plausible candidate. There was almost certainly a significant contribution later in the project by the renowned Michele Sanmicheli, who is credited with near certainty for designing the pseudo-transept (sometimes simply described as the space before the presbytery) and the dome, which was completed by his cousin Paolo. The facade is hypothesized to be based on an idea by the Veronese painter and architect Paolo Farinati.

The completion dates of the church can be inferred from an inscription above the door connecting the cloister to the church, which records the consecration dates of the altars. It notes that in 1536, the Bishop of Verona Gian Matteo Giberti consecrated three altars, later removed, while seven years later, the Greek Bishop of Chalcis Dionysius blessed the remaining nine, including the main altar. Therefore, it is reasonable to conclude that the church was completed by 1536, though the dome was not yet in place. The presbytery and dome were completed before 1543. The flooring began to be laid in 1557, the same year Sanmicheli conceived the bell tower, similar in design to that of the cathedral. It was later started by Bernardino Brugnoli but never completed.

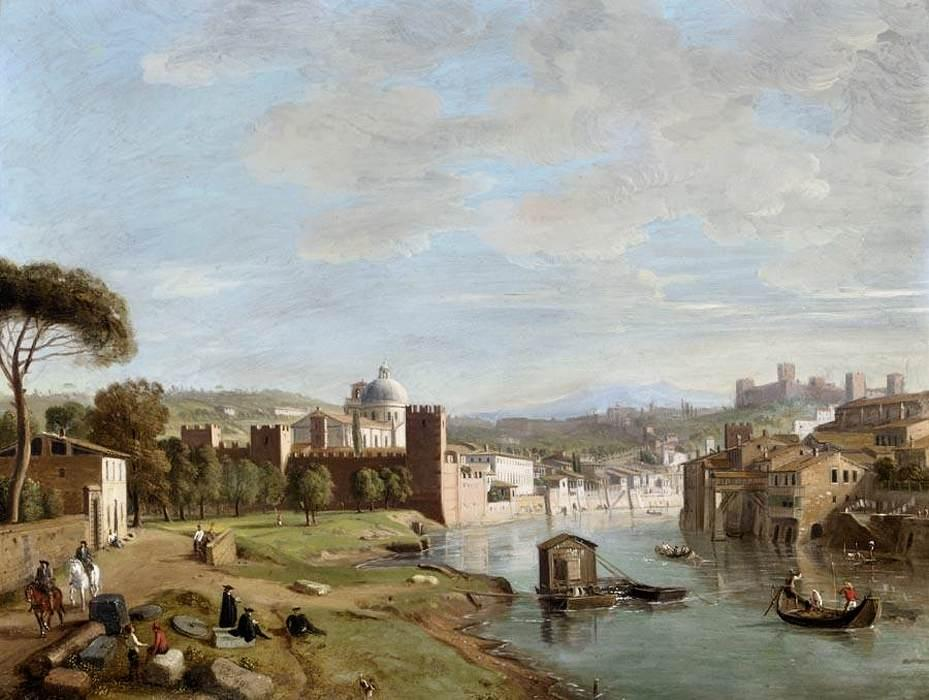
The San Giorgio in Braida complex as it appeared between the 17th and 18th centuries, in a painting by Gaspar van Wittel.

On December 6, 1668, with the papal brief Agri Dominici curae, Pope Clement XI suppressed the San Giorgio in Alga congregation. Biancolini reports that the remaining assets were sold at public auction to fund the War of Candia against the Ottoman Empire. The monastic complex was thus purchased by the nuns of Santa Maria in Reggio for 10,500 ducats. During the nuns’ tenure, the complex was completed with the construction of the rectory, designed by architect Luigi Trezza, and the completion of the facade. The pipe organ was also restored, and other minor works were carried out.

=== From the time of Napoleon to the present day ===
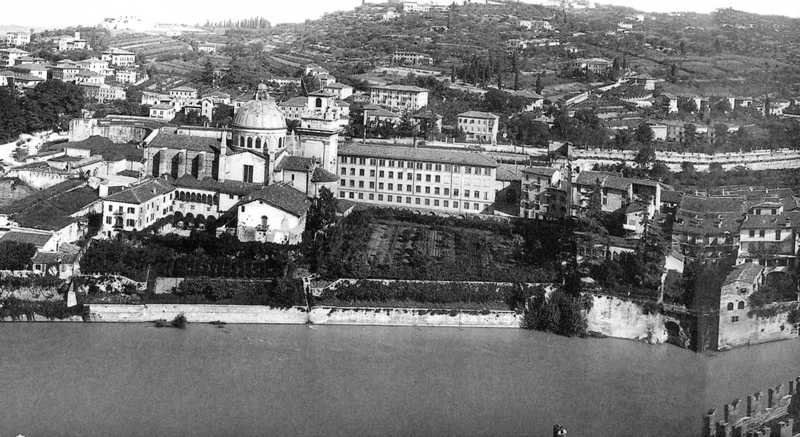
The complex photographed from above in 1935.

The nuns remained at San Giorgio for nearly a century and a half until Napoleon suppressed the convent. In 1807, the parish itself was also dissolved, becoming an oratory dependent on Santo Stefano. In 1837, during the Austrian domination, much of the abandoned and deteriorating monastery was demolished to make way for the new fortifications encircling the city. Specifically, the 15th-century cloister was demolished (with one arm preserved in the eastern wall) and the section facing the Adige.

On March 2, 1874, following a decision by the Holy See, San Giorgio in Braida was reinstated as an independent parish, and on October 28 of the same year, Don Ferdinando Guella was appointed its first parish priest. In 1938, restoration works supervised by Alfredo Barbacci led to the partial reconstruction of the 16th-century cloister.

== Description ==
=== Exterior ===
==== Facade ====
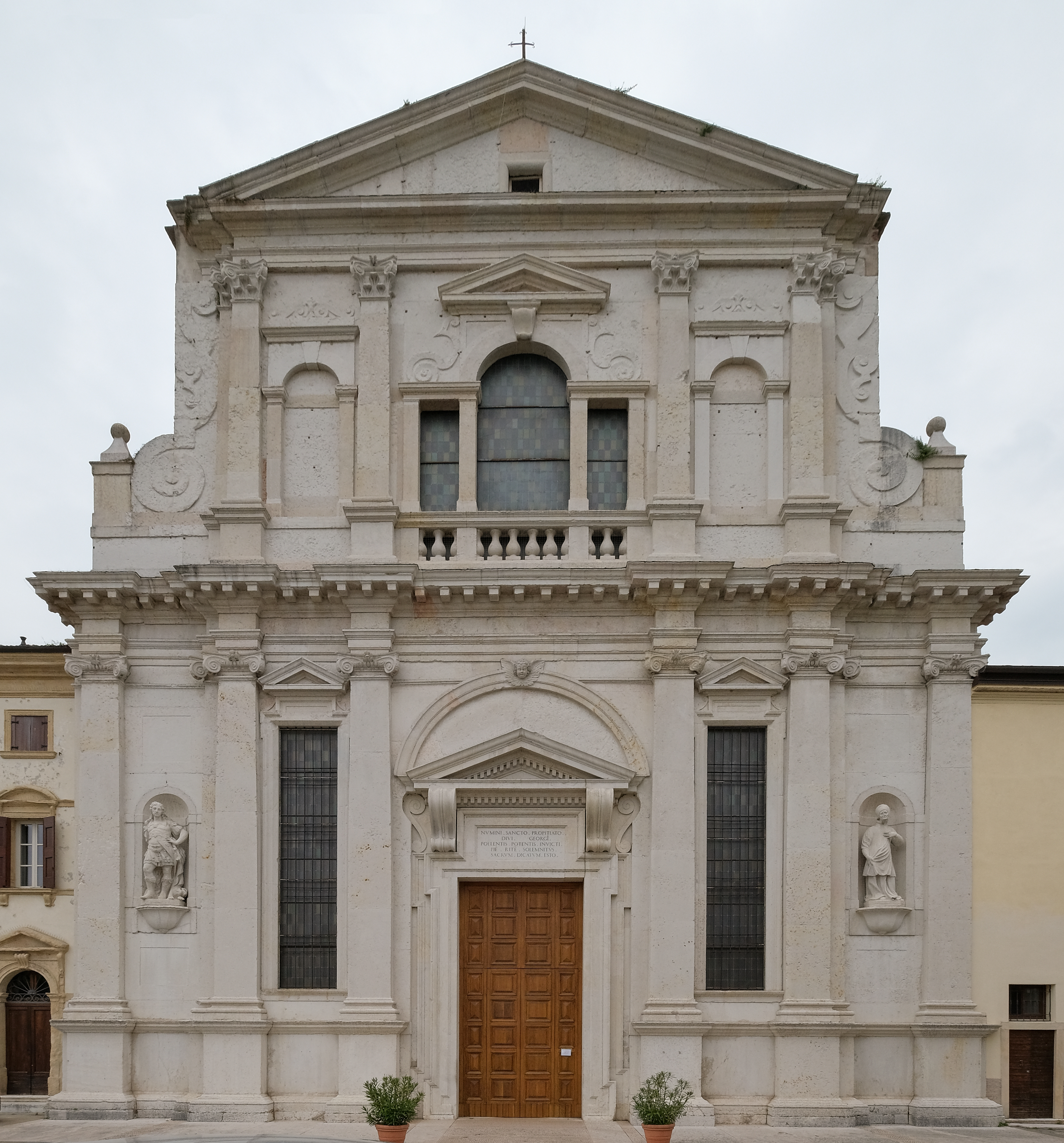
The church’s facade.

The facade was one of the last parts of the complex completed during the works commissioned by the Canons of San Giorgio in Alga. The architect is unknown, with names such as Jacopo Sansovino, Vincenzo Scamozzi, and Michele Sanmicheli proposed over time. Most scholars suggest that the general design is attributable to Bernardino Brugnoli, with a likely later contribution by Paolo Farinati, a renowned Veronese painter occasionally active as an architect.

Purely Renaissance in style with some Baroque elements, the facade is divided into two orders. The lower order, dating to the 16th century, is of higher quality, enriched by pillars of the Ionic order. The upper order, likely from the following century, appears cruder, with pillars of the Corinthian order. The material used is white marble, unlike the rest of the church, which is almost entirely in brickwork. Two lateral niches house statues of Saint George and Saint Lawrence Justinian, placed there at the behest of Sister Maria Scolastica, as noted on the pedestal.

Above the portal, within a blind arch, an inscription dedicates the building: “Numini Sancto propitiato / divi Georgii / pollenti potenti invicti / pie rite solemnitus / sacrum dicatum esto”, translated as: “May this temple be consecrated and dedicated with a solemn and pious ceremony under the patronage of Saint George, the powerful and invincible.”

==== Dome ====
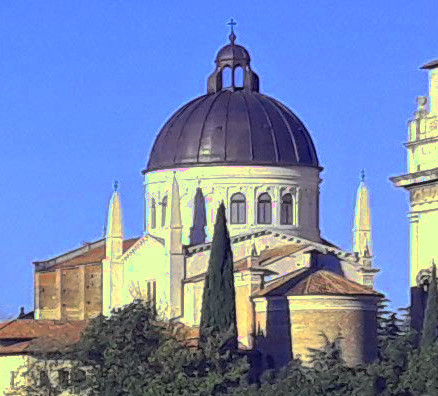
The Sanmicheli dome.

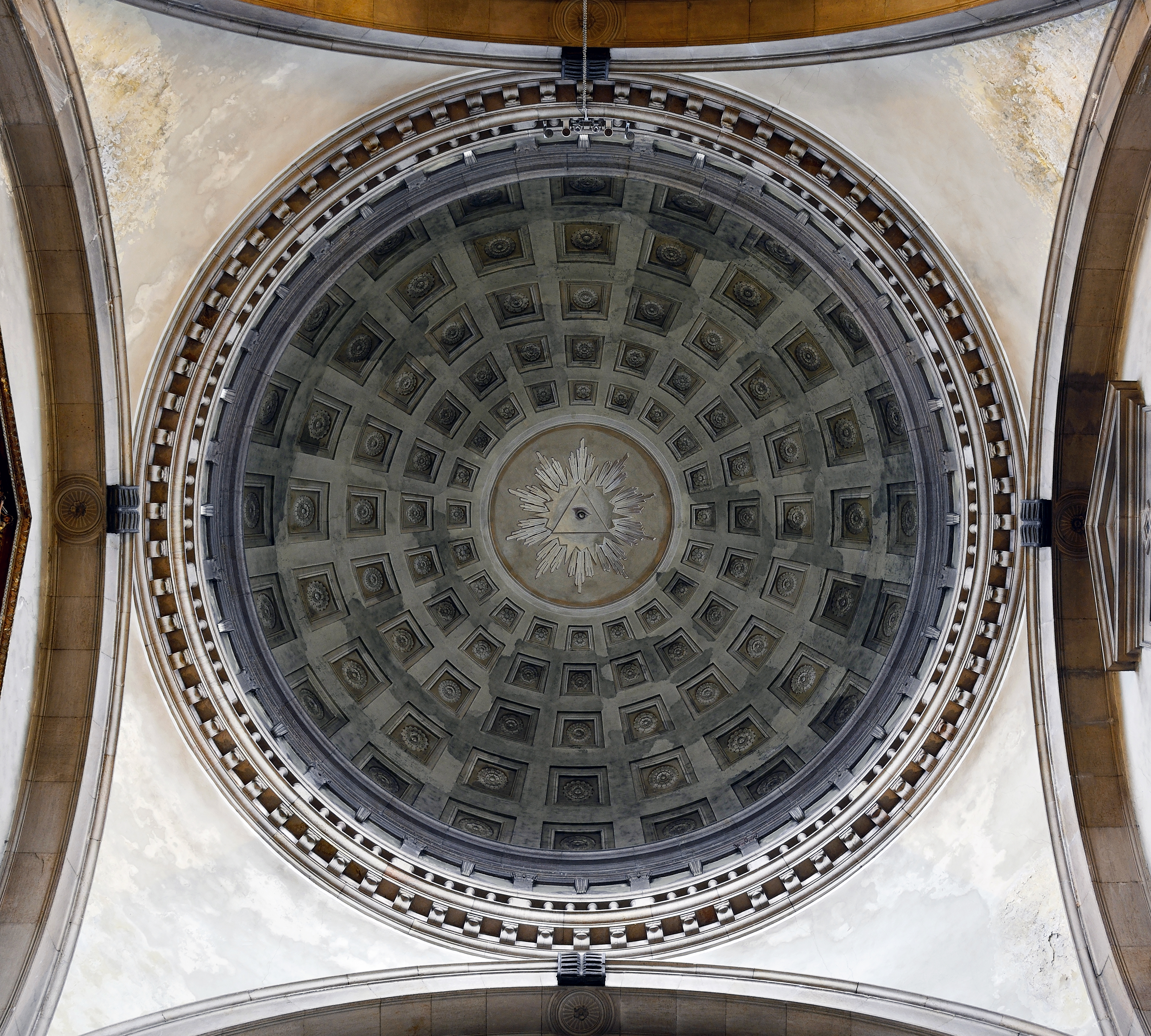
The intrados of the dome.

The church’s roofing was completed in the first half of the 16th century with the construction of an imposing dome designed by the Veronese architect Michele Sanmicheli. Its style reflects the contemporary Roman architectural taste familiar to Sanmicheli, who worked under Antonio da Sangallo the Younger. This Roman influence blends with Venetian architectural principles, evident in the use of lead sheets over a wooden structure, topped by a lantern, a design also seen in the domes of Andrea Palladio and Sanmicheli’s Church of Madonna di Campagna.

The dome has a diameter of 14 meters, with its oculus at a height of 34 meters from the floor. It rests on a drum with walls made of two layers of bricks, lightened by triforas that allow daylight to enter throughout the day. The cap is constructed with a single layer of bricks. The simple entablature mirrors the style of the semi-dome. The structure is covered in lead, completed in 1604 after several reconstructions. The completion is marked by an inscription on the tabernacle: “DIE XXVI OCTOB. FUIT FINITA / ANNO D.NI MDCIV”. It is believed the covering was originally open, likely to allow external light.

On April 22, 1776, the dome’s summit was severely damaged by a lightning strike, but repairs were promptly made, as evidenced by an inscription on the internal balustrade: “RESTAURAVIT ANO D. 1776”.

==== Bell tower ====
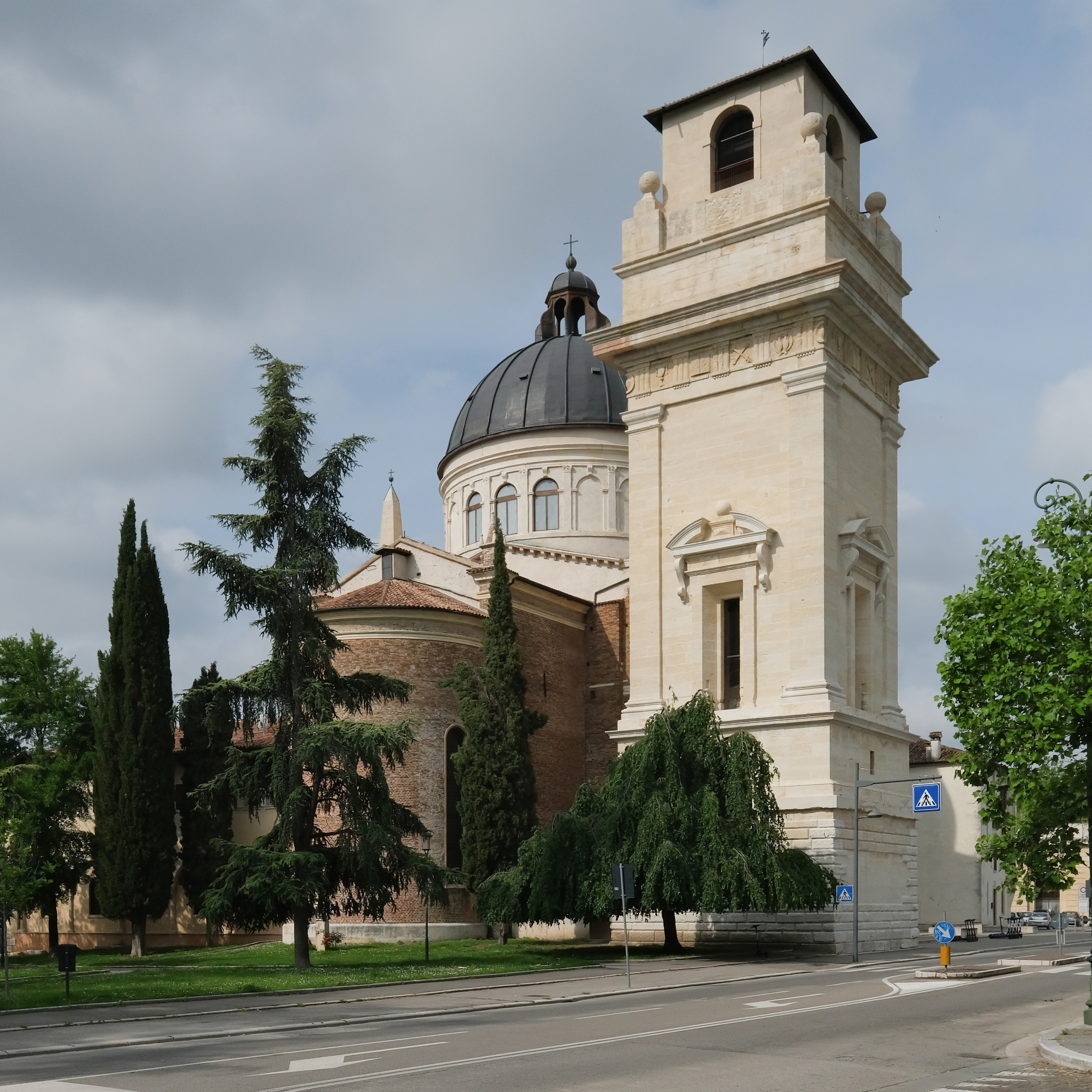
The unfinished Renaissance bell tower.

Tradition attributes the design of the bell tower to Michele Sanmicheli, but its creator and builder was his relative and disciple Bernardino Brugnoli. The structure remains unfinished, but the completed base and first order suggest the ambitious scale of the original project. Various theories explain why it was never completed: it may have been to avoid surpassing the height of the nearby Torre dei Lamberti, for military reasons, or due to insufficient funds. Several proposals for its completion were considered but never executed.

The tower is built in tuff with a base of roughly hewn stones. The first level, the only one completed as intended, features a large slit window on each side in a Baroque style. On the sides, pilasters of the Ionic order end in a rich frieze with carved liturgical symbols: a chalice, an open missal, a processional cross, and two ampullae. The second order was barely started and later roughly completed with a brick belfry, accessible via a convenient internal staircase.

The belfry houses six bells in a descending G3 scale. Cast by the renowned founder Giuseppe Ruffini in 1776, with the smallest added by the Chiappani foundry in the mid-19th century, the bell ensemble is notable for its artistic decoration and sound quality. It is also credited with originating the Veronese bell ringing technique, which is still practiced today. Originally, the bell tower was accessible from the sacristy through an underground passage beneath the high altar, which was sealed during the 20th-century restoration.

==== Former rectory building ====
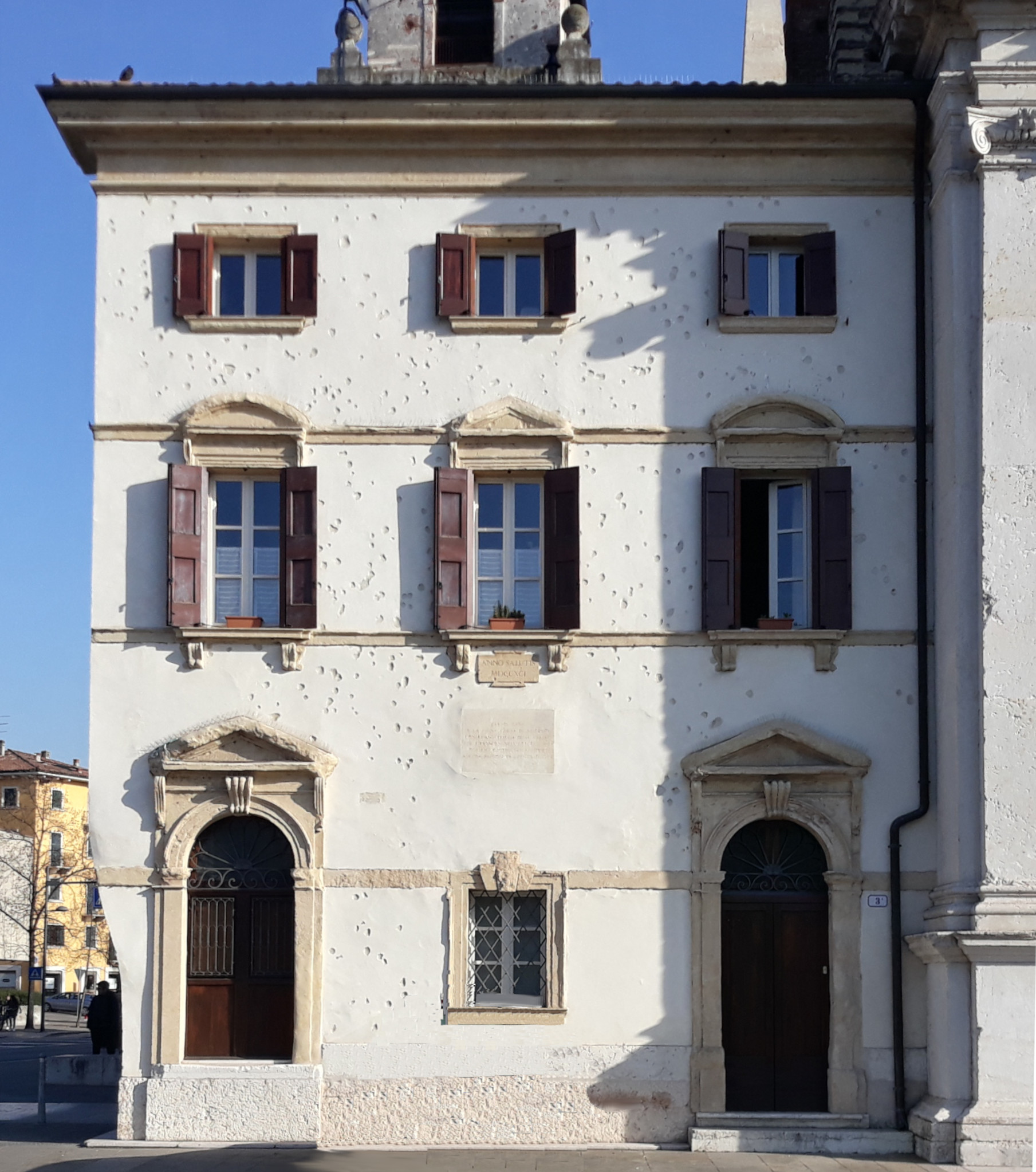
Palace built by Luigi Trezza next to the church. Note the marks on the plaster from the clash between French and Austrian forces in October 1805.

During the tenure of the nuns of Santa Maria di Reggio, the Veronese architect Luigi Trezza was commissioned to build a structure to house the rectory. Completed in 1792, the three-story palace stands immediately to the left of the church, aligned with its facade. The ground floor, slightly elevated above the square, opens onto it with two portals topped by round arches and triangular tympana. The piano nobile features three windows, also topped by tympana—triangular for the central window and slightly curved for the lateral ones. The tympana and sills are connected by stringcourses. All window frames are made of tuff from nearby Avesa quarries.

The plaster on the facade facing the square bears several bullet holes from a clash between French and Austrian soldiers in October 1805, when Verona was divided between the two powers following the Treaty of Lunéville. A plaque in the center commemorates the event.

==== Cloister ====
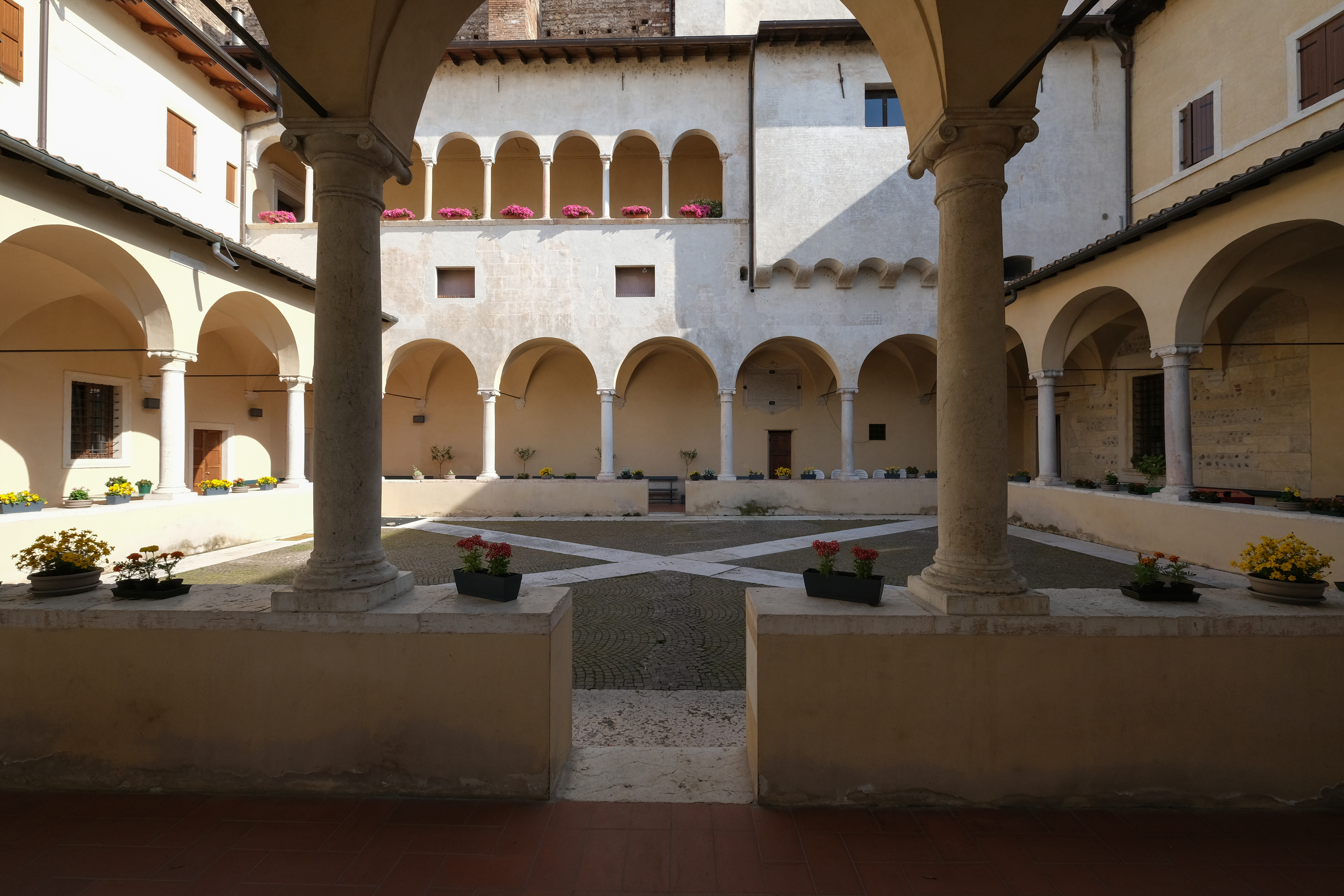
16th-century cloister, note the Doric loggia on the northern side.

While only faint traces remain of the 15th-century cloister, preserved in one arm embedded in the eastern wall, the 16th-century cloister has survived, though with some alterations over time. Built in the early 16th century by the Canons of San Giorgio in Alga during the Renaissance reconstruction, it is located on the southern side of the church. The rectangular cloister features an order of columns in Veronese white limestone, with the northern side topped by an additional Doric order forming a loggia. The walls are made of plastered bricks, supporting, along with the columns, a cross vault roof.

Above the door leading from the cloister to the church is an inscription commemorating the consecration of the internal altars, a key record for the final stages of the building’s construction:

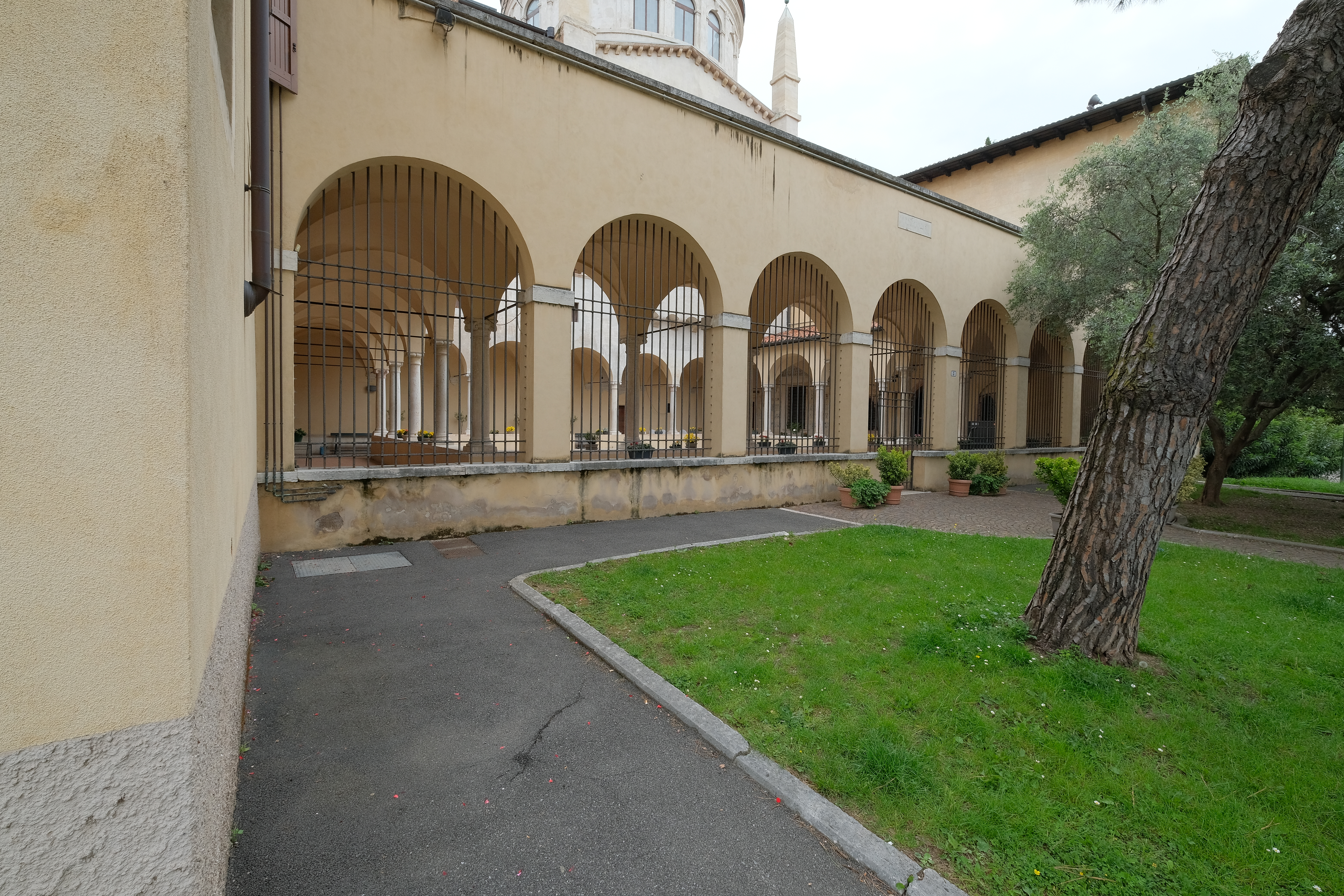
The cloister seen from the south.

V. CAL. MAIAS M.D.XXXVI /

AD DEI OPT. MAX. GLORIAM EIVSQ. MARTY / GEOR. ÆDE HANC / ALTARIAQ. III E QVIB. DVO POSTEA / LOCIS AMOTA FVERE / RELIQVVM TITVLO MICH. GAB. RAPH. / C(OE)TEROR. Q. ANG. JO. / MATH. GIB. EPS. VERON. ALIA IX SEPTENNIO / POST DIONYS. / GAÆC. CHIRON. ET MILOPOT. ANTISTES / MAXIMUM EIUSD. / VIRG. ET MARTY CÆCILIE CHA. (AG.) AGN. / ET LVCIÆ II BEAT. LAVR. / PROTOPATR. VENET. ZEN. SYL. MART. / PONT. III SANCTISS. / TRINIT. SEB. Q. ET RONCHI III LAV. STEPH. / VINC. ET CHRISTOPH. / MARTY V VRSVLÆ ET SOC. PRID. CAL. AVG. / ET MOX IIII / NO. HÆC E RELIGIONE OMN. APOST. INDE / ANT. BENED. MAV. ET / BERN. ABB. POSTREM. MARIÆ MAGD. / MARTHÆ FRATR. Q. / LAZ. PRÆSVLES AMBO PIIS. CONSECRARVNT /

ANSELMO CANERIO VERON PRIORE MERITISS.

At the final arch on the northern side, another notable inscription reads:

CRUCES QUAS PRÆ OCULIS /

LECTOR HABES INTUERE / INTERVALLUQ. MENTE CONCIPIAS / IN QUO CADAVERU OSSA / E CAPITULI SEPULCHRIS USQUEQUAQ / REPLENTIS / HUC TRANSLATA ANNO D.NI MDCXXXXVI / INFERIUS HUMATA IACENT /

REQUIEM ILLIS PRECATOR ÆTERNAM /

This records the gathering of the monks’ former tombs from the convent. On the eastern side of the cloister, there is a portal and several biforas, likely built in the 14th century during the time of the Augustinian monks, opening onto the rectory.

=== Interior ===
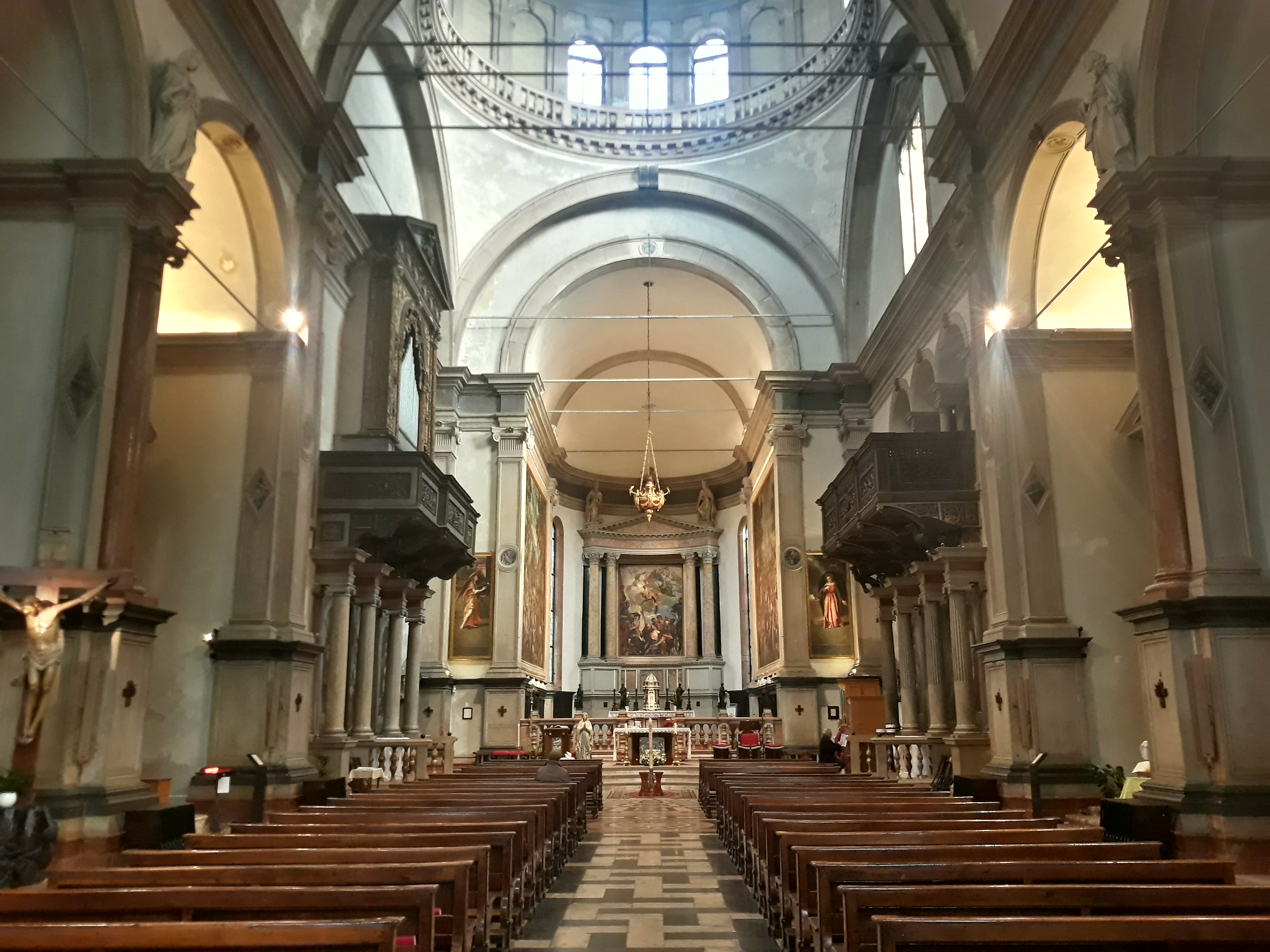
The church’s nave.

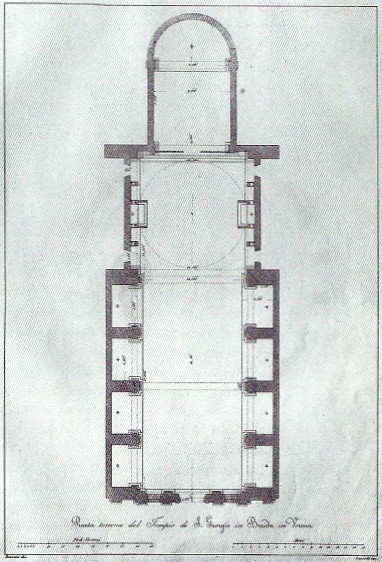
Plan of the church drawn by Francesco Ronzani and Girolamo Luciolli.

The interior spaces, completed between 1536 and 1543, are organized in a single nave with four chapels on each side of the nave. The nave ends in an apse, housing the presbytery, accessible through a slightly defined transept (referred to by some as a pseudo-transept). The interior, purely Renaissance in style with its protrusions and recesses, does not “convey the mystical atmosphere of Romanesque or Gothic traditions, reflecting the shift from medieval theocentrism to the humanistic era.”

Numerous significant artworks are preserved there. Above the nave’s entrance is a painting by Tintoretto depicting the Baptism of Christ. A work by Paolo Veronese, The Martyrdom of Saint George, is displayed across from it in the semi-dome. In the presbytery, alongside Veronese’s work, are two large canvases: one by Paolo Farinati, Multiplication of the Loaves and Fishes, and another by Felice Brusasorci, The Manna in the Desert. The altar beneath the choir loft houses the Madonna and Child with Saints by Moretto.

==== Lateral chapels ====
On both sides of the church along the nave, there are chapels, four on the right and four on the left, the latter slightly deeper. Each houses a white marble altar, all consecrated in 1543 by the Greek Bishop of Chalcis Dionysius, except for the fourth on the right, consecrated seven years earlier by the Veronese Bishop Gian Matteo Giberti. The altarpieces are all made of wood.

===== First chapel on the left =====
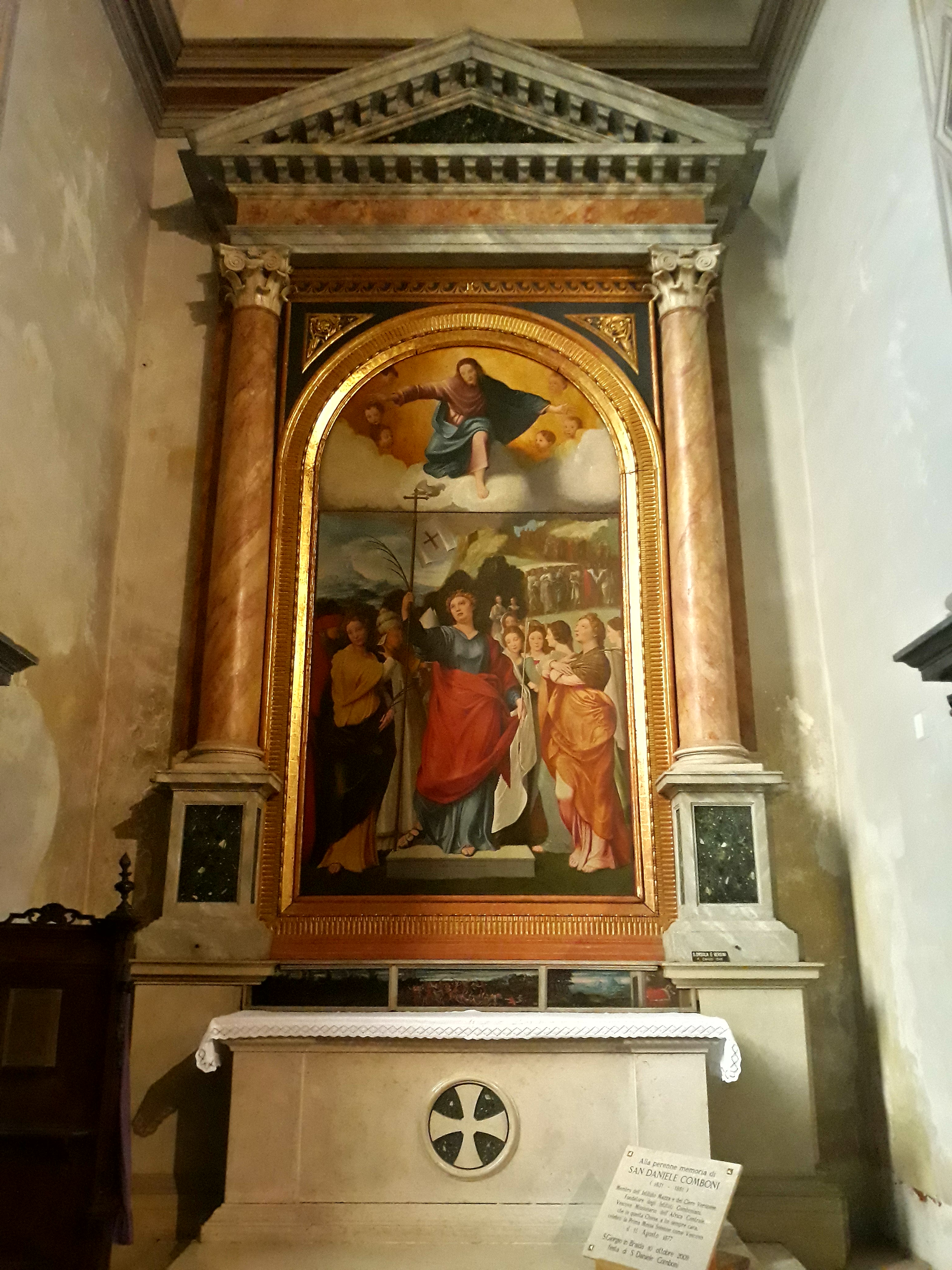
Saint Ursula, by Giovanni Francesco Caroto, first chapel on the left.

The chapel is dedicated to Saint Ursula, as is the altarpiece here, Saint Ursula, painted (oil on canvas) by the Veronese artist Giovanni Francesco Caroto in 1545, at the height of his artistic maturity, as indicated by the inscription: “FRANCISCUS-CAROTUS P.A.A. MDXXXXV”. The predella features sketches depicting three episodes from the saint’s life; the artist is unknown, but they may have been drafted by Caroto and left unfinished. At the altar’s base, made of white marble with a wooden altarpiece, is the tomb of the priest M. Antonio Lerchi, marked by the inscription: “OSSA / R.DI DNI. MARCI LERCHI SACERDOTI / HIC POSITA / ANNO 1692”.

===== Second chapel on the left =====
Dedicated to the holy martyrs Stephen, Vincent, and Christopher, it houses a canvas, Martyrdom of Saint Lawrence, by Sigismondo de Stefani, clearly inspired by the nearby Martyrdom of Saint George by Paolo Veronese. The complex composition centers on Christ surrounded by Saints Stephen and Vincent and the symbols of the four evangelists, each with an open book showing the opening of their gospel. The canvas is signed and dated “SIGISMUNDUS DE STEPHANIS / VER. PINXIT MDLXIII”. The predella, also by de Stefani, depicts The Martyrdom of Saint Stephen, Saint Christopher Crossing the River, and The Martyrdom of Saint Vincent. The chapel also houses the tomb of Cristoforo Nina, as indicated by the inscription: “1725 16 GIUGNO / QUI GIACE IL NOB, SIG. CRISTOFORO NINA / CAVAL. COL. DE CIMARIOTI / XRISOPHORO VIVO”.

===== Third chapel on the left =====
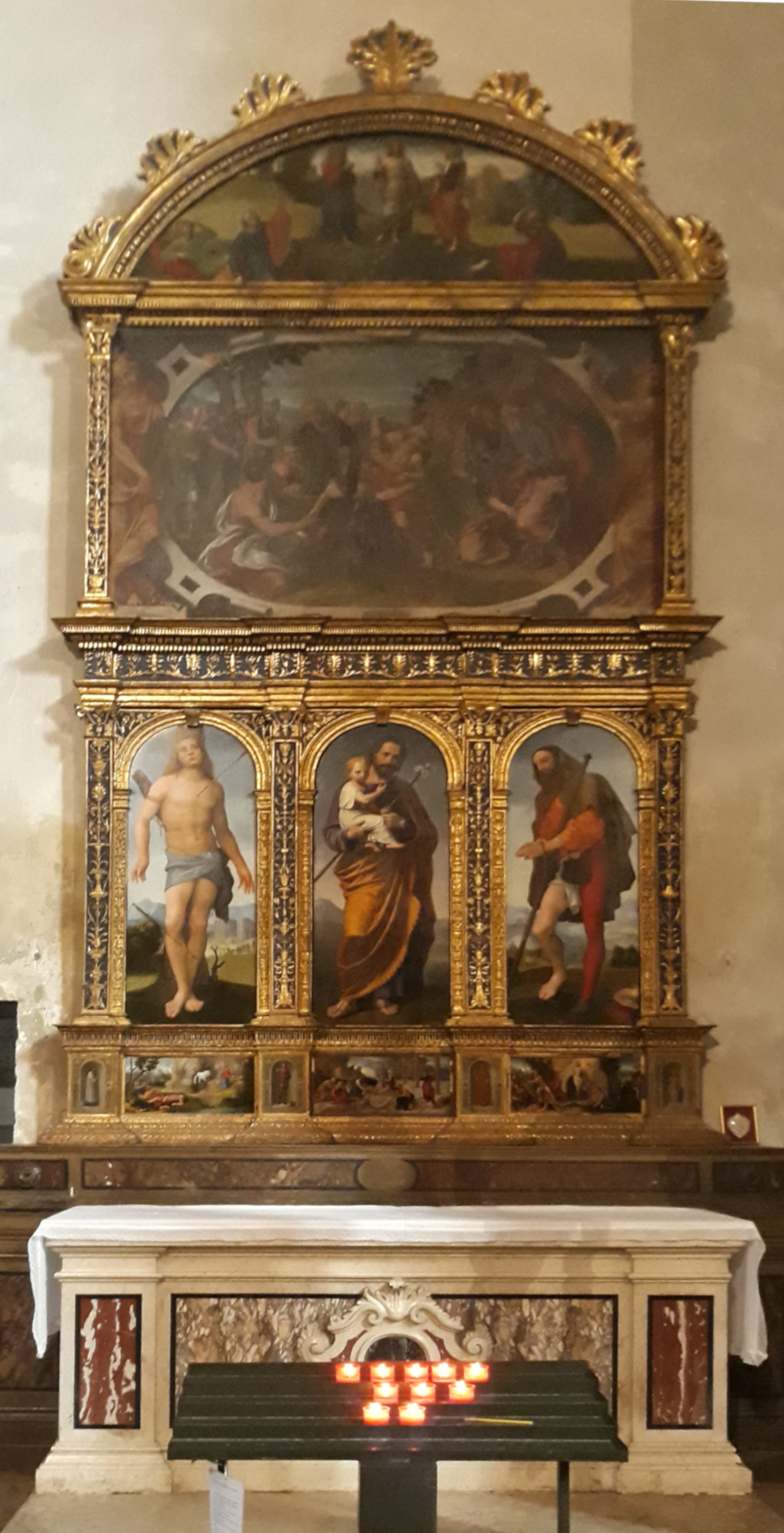
Altar with the Polyptych of San Giorgio in Braida.

Dedicated to the Holy Trinity and Saints Roch and Sebastian, the altar, known as Saint Joseph’s, is surmounted by the Polyptych of San Giorgio in Braida by multiple artists. The central triptych includes Saint Sebastian (left) and Saint Roch (right) by Giovanni Francesco Caroto, while the central Saint Joseph is by Angelo Recchia, who in 1882 replaced an original Cross-Bearer of unknown authorship (possibly also by Caroto). The lower predella is also by Caroto, depicting evangelical scenes: Prayer in the Garden, Deposition, and Resurrection. The upper lunette is also by Caroto. The backgrounds of the paintings clearly feature Veronese landscapes, typical of the Veronese school of painting. Below the lunette is a painting by Domenico Brusasorci from around 1553, depicting an episode of a failed exorcism described in the Acts of the Apostles. Flanking the oval are two caryatids, and at the base is an inscription noting buried remains: “MARGARITA DE FERRARYS / DEP [...] TA IDIB. APRIL. 1686 / REQUIESCIT / ESPECTANS RESURECTIONEM MORTUORUM”.

A small door to the left of the polyptych leads to the Oratory of Christ, where, since the 19th century, a fresco traditionally attributed to a soldier and numerous ex-votos are preserved.

===== Fourth chapel on the left =====
The altar was initially consecrated in 1536 by Bishop Giberti, later rebuilt in stone, and reconsecrated by Dionysius seven years later. The chapel is adorned with a canvas by Girolamo dai Libri from 1526, as inscribed: “A.D. MDXXVI MEN. MAR. XXVIIII / HIERONIMUS A LIBRIS PINXIT”. Known as Madonna of the Girdle, it depicts the Virgin with the chapel’s titular saints, Saint Zeno and Saint Lawrence, alongside a multitude of angels beneath the throne.

In the lunette, a work by Domenico Brusasorci, depicting the Eternal Father, was added later, likely between the two consecrations of the altar.

===== First chapel on the right =====
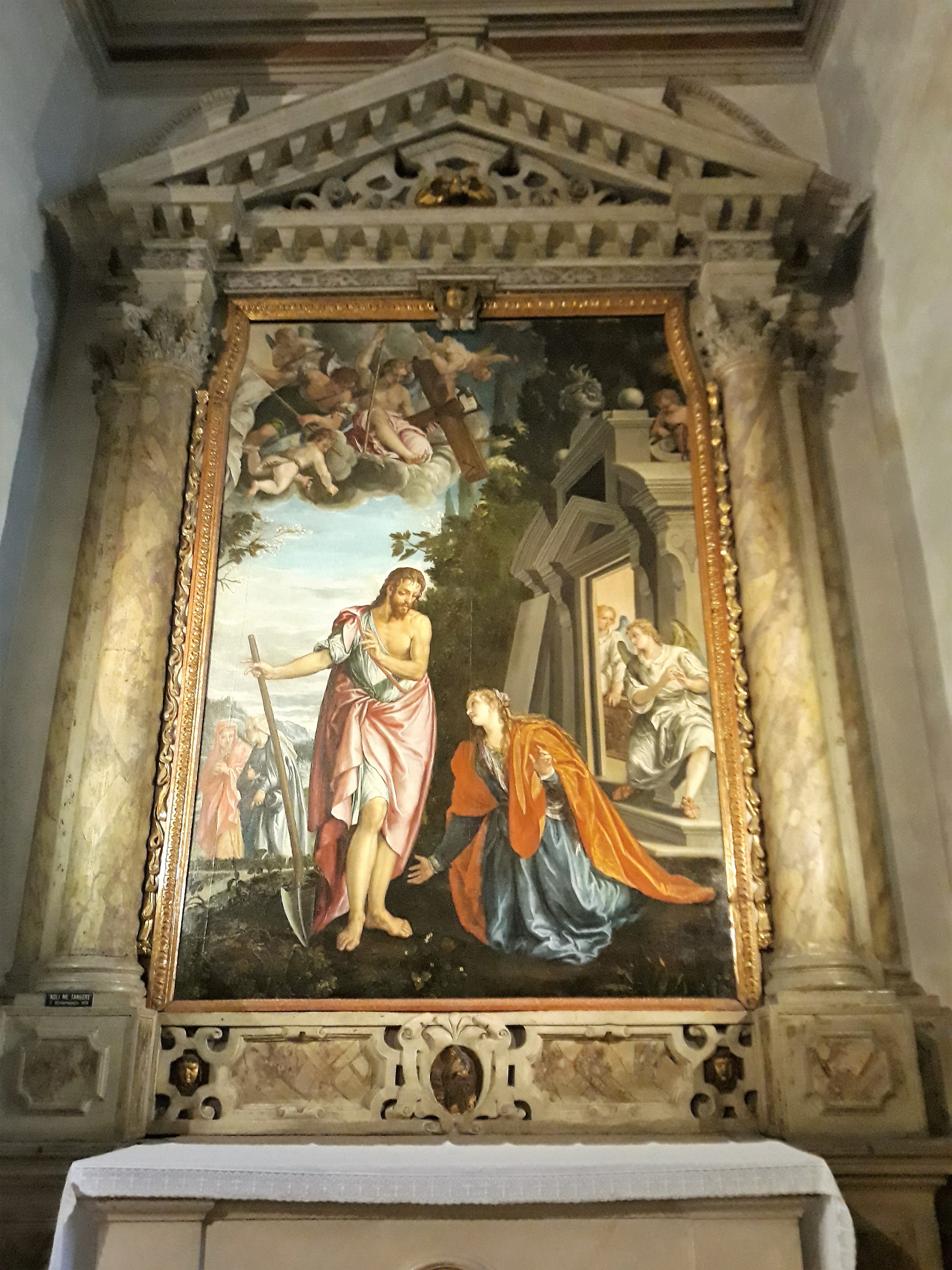
Francesco Montemezzano, Noli me tangere, first chapel on the right.

The altar of the first chapel on the right, consecrated on August 10, 1543, was originally dedicated to Mary Magdalene, Martha, and Saint Lazarus. The altarpiece, traditionally attributed to a pupil of Paolo Veronese, Francesco Montemezzano, was painted in 1580 and represents his only significant commission in Verona. Titled Noli me tangere, it depicts the Magdalene in the garden encountering the Risen Christ. Within the pediment is a Baroque-style depiction of the Holy Spirit as a dove. At the chapel’s base is a tomb where, since the late 18th century, the parish priest Mazzi rests, as noted by the inscription: “GIUSEPPE MAZZI PARROCO / MORTO IL 26 NOVEMBRE 1788”.

===== Second chapel on the right =====
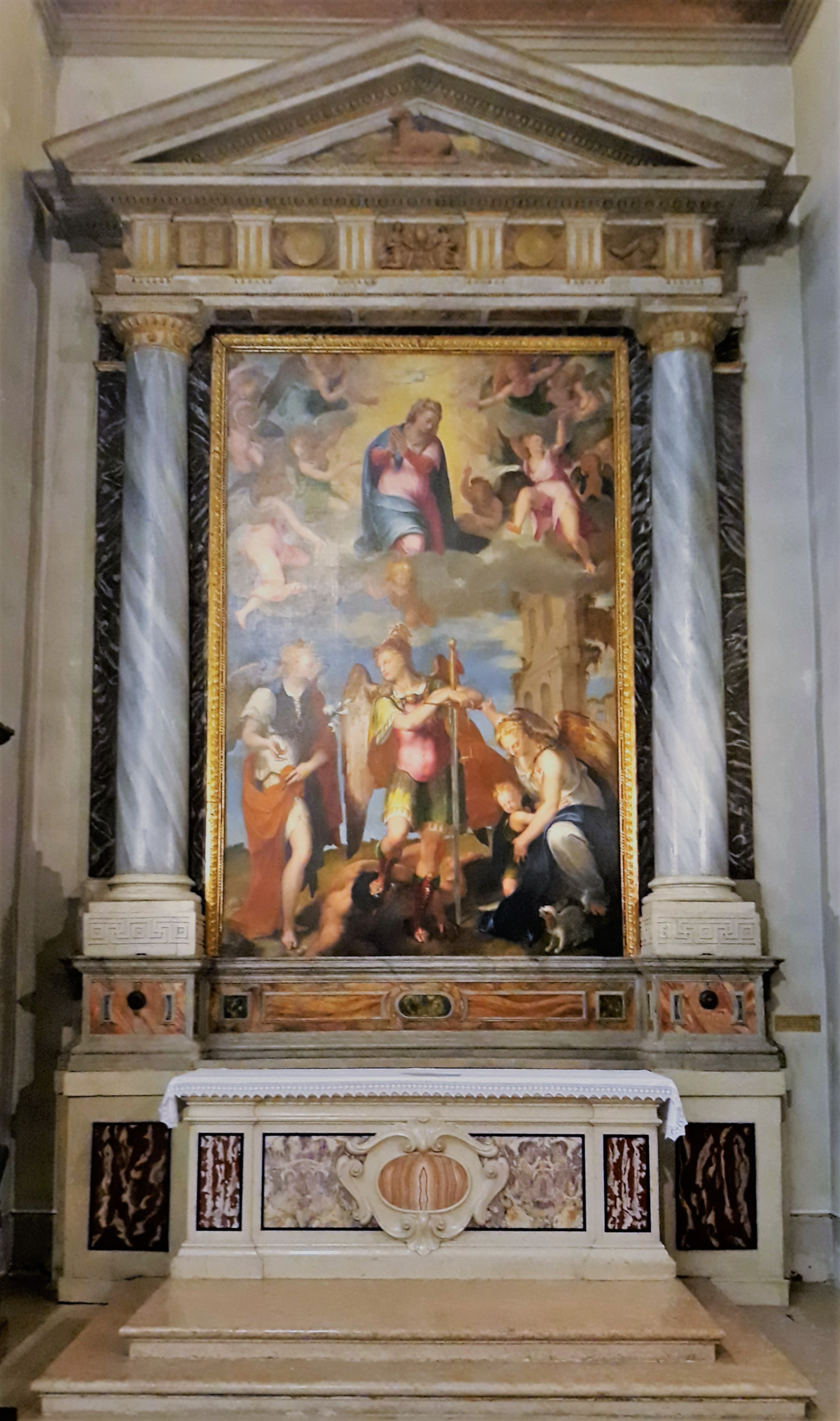
Fourth chapel on the right with the canvas Three Archangels and the Madonna in Glory.

The dedication of the second chapel’s altar on the right is said to stem from a vow. It is dedicated to Saints Anthony, Benedict, Maurus, and Bernard. The canvas adorning the chapel, painted by Pasquale Ottino, a pupil of Brusasorci, depicts an Assumption and Benedictine Saints. Art critic Annamaria Calcagni Conforti notes it as “the subject of particular acclaim […], noted by extensive early historiography for its Emilian influence and exceptional color quality.” The altar may be the work of Bernardino Brugnoli. The pediment features a depiction of a lamb, while the frieze includes Eucharistic symbols similar to those on the bell tower’s first order. A sepulchral inscription at the base reads: “GIO BAPTA FRANCO PARROCO / MORI DI ANNI 60 IL 1 AGOTO 1803 / QUI GICE”.

===== Third chapel on the right =====
The altar of this chapel is dedicated to the Apostles. The heavily damaged altarpiece, depicting the Descent of the Holy Spirit, was painted by Domenico Robusti, son of Tintoretto, showcasing the best aspects of Mannerism that he inherited from his father. At the base, the altar is adorned with a stucco of Saint George. An inscription reads: “QUI VIXIT LXXXVII IN CURA ANIMARUM / DILIGENTI XXXV / HIC IACET IOANNE BAPTA MAROGNA / OB. 17 MAJ 1736”.

===== Fourth chapel on the right =====
The altar, dedicated to Saints Michael, Raphael, Gabriel, and the Angels, is the only one of the three consecrated in 1536 by Bishop Gian Matteo Giberti that remains in the church. The altarpiece, depicting Three Archangels and the Madonna in Glory, was likely painted under the supervision of Jacopo Ligozzi by the local artist Felice Brusasorci shortly after his stay in Tuscany. The Veronese scholar Scipione Maffei praised this painting, stating, “Never have there been, nor could there ever be, angels that seem more angelic.” A sepulchral inscription at the altar’s base reads: “JO BAPTÆ COLLINI / SACER. CIVIT. VER. / CINERARIUM / OB. 26 LULY 1734”.

==== Oratory of Christ ====
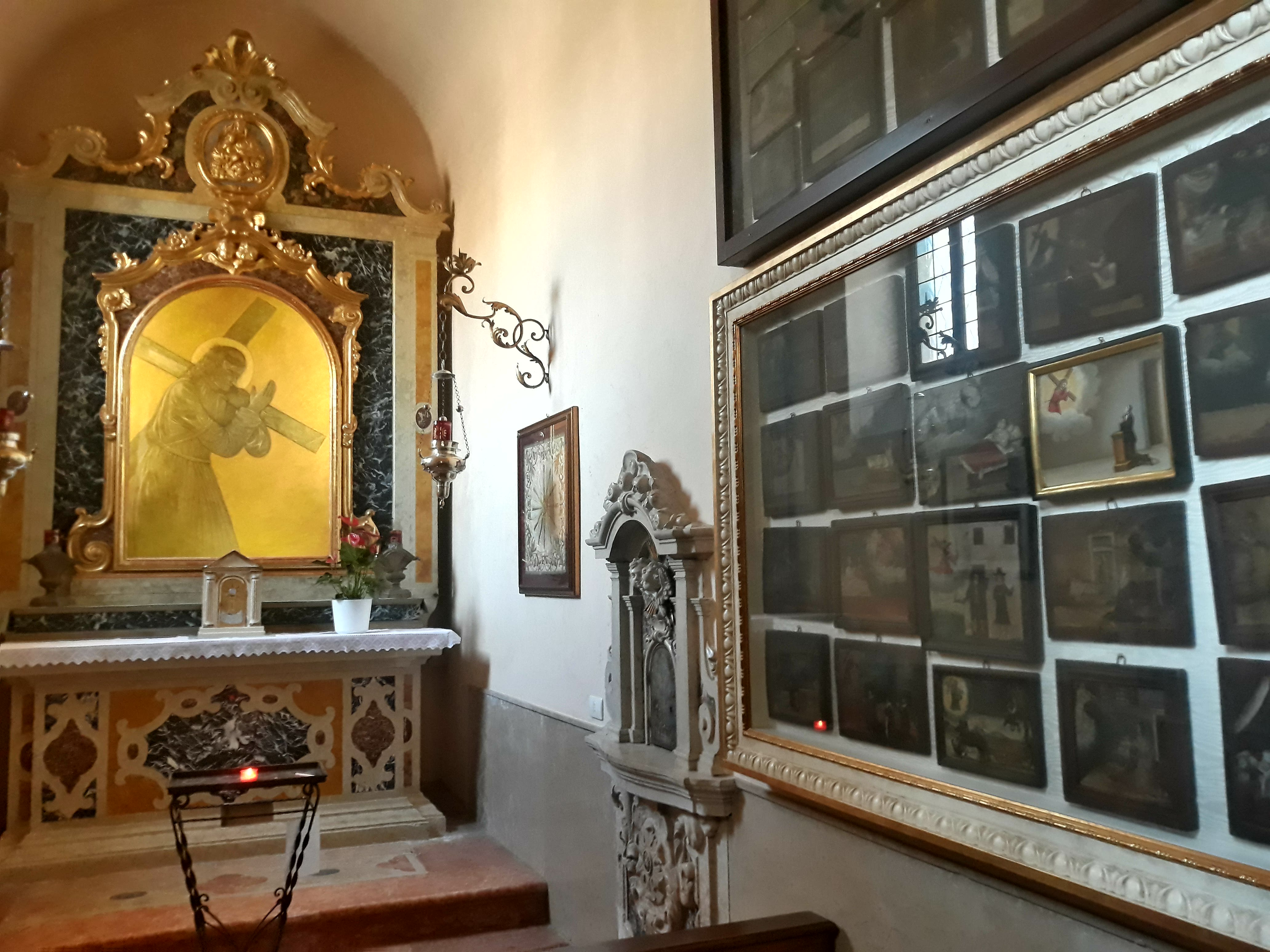
Oratory of Christ, showing the Christ Carrying the Cross and part of the numerous ex-votos on the right.

This small oratory was created in the 19th century on the left wall of the church, accessible via a small passage in the third chapel on the left, beside the polyptych. It houses a sacred image of Christ Carrying the Cross, traditionally said to have been painted in 1445 by a soldier stationed at the San Giorgio bastion. The work quickly attracted local devotion, leading the Battuti confraternity to build a structure beside the church in 1620 to house it. After the demolition of this building, the painting was placed in the current oratory, where it remains today alongside numerous ex-votos.

==== Area in front of the presbytery ====
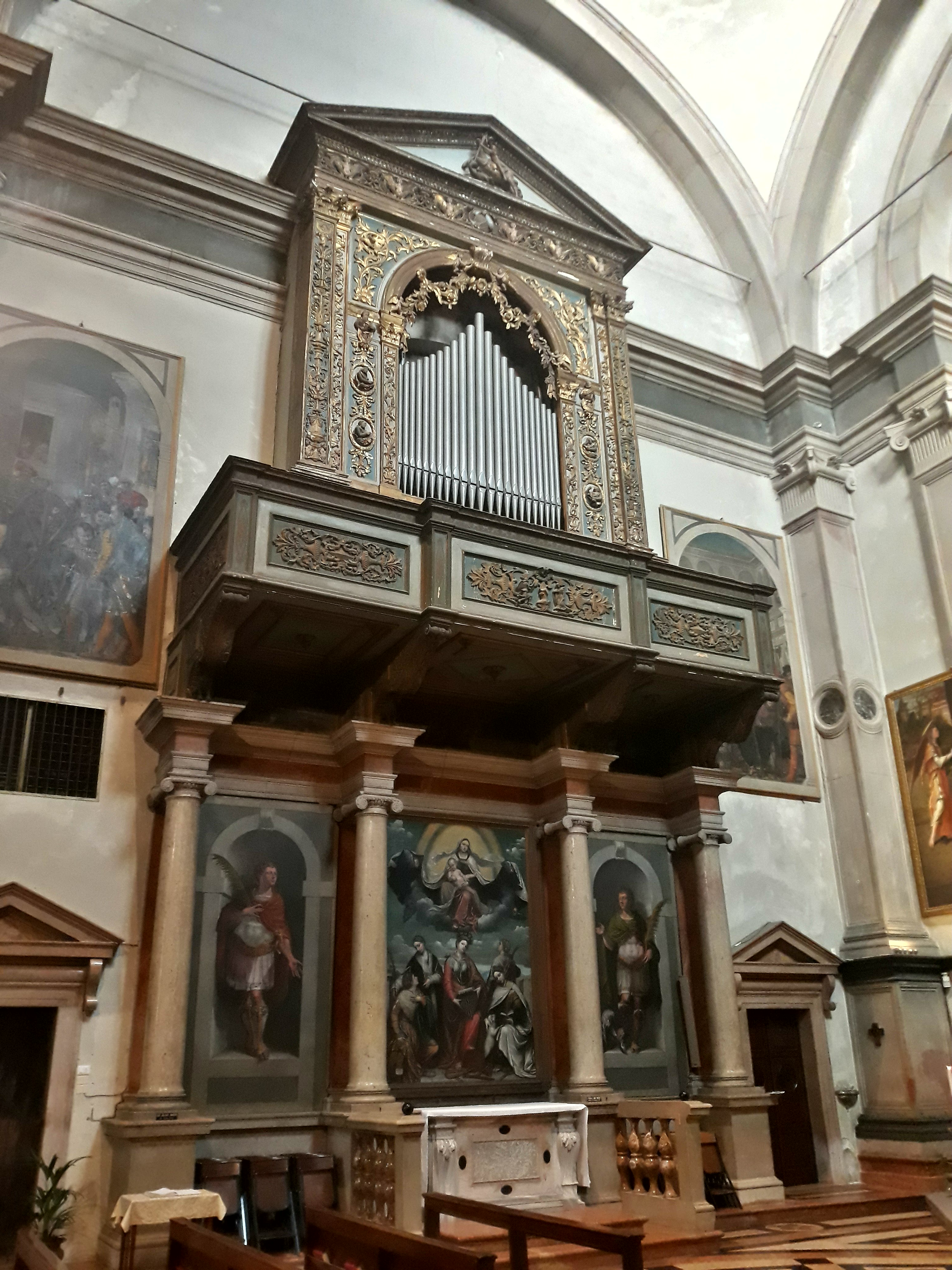
The left side of the area in front of the presbytery (or pseudo-transept) contains an altar, a choir loft, and an organ.

Before reaching the presbytery, at the end of the lateral chapels, lies a space identifiable as a slightly defined transept (termed a pseudo-transept by some). Its limited width is likely due to spatial constraints or to create a compact structure to support the Sanmicheli dome. The two lateral altars, both attributed to Bernardino Brugnoli, feature a peristyle with Ionic columns and a protruding entablature. The right altar once housed a Paolo Veronese altarpiece, Saint Barnabas Healing the Sick (c. 1568), now replaced by a 19th-century copy by an anonymous artist. The original is at the Musée des Beaux-Arts in Rouen, having been looted during the Napoleonic occupation. Flanking it are two canvases traditionally attributed to Bernardino India: Saint Jerome and Saint Gregory, though likely by a contemporary artist. The choir loft features a 16th-century wooden parapet with a central Madonna and Child.

The left altar, architecturally similar to the right, is dedicated to the virgins Cecilia, Catherine, Agatha, Agnes, and Lucy, depicted in the corresponding altarpiece by Moretto, signed and dated: “ALEXANDER MORETTUS BRIX. F. MDXL.”. Flanking it are two canvases, also mistakenly attributed to Bernardino India, depicting Saints Firmus and Rusticus, Martyred in Verona. Three monochromatic paintings with Biblical Subjects are certainly by India. Beside the altar are two doors topped by a marble entablature; the left leads to the baptistery, a hexagonal structure in red Verona marble from the 15th century.

On the eastern walls of the pseudo-transept, outside the presbytery, are two canvases by Giovanni Caroto (brother of Giovanni Francesco), depicting the Annunciation. Dated around 1508, they are believed to have originally been organ shutters. A pillar bears an inscription noting the sale of the monastery to the nuns of Santa Maria di Reggio: “MDCLXIX ADI XV AGOTO / MONSIGNOR ILL.MO E RMO / LORENZO ARCIV° TROTTI NONTI: / APLICO / CON L’AUTORITA’ DELLA SANTA / SEDE GA CONCESSO QUESTO CONVENTO / ALLE MONACHE DI S MARIA DI / REGGIO CON ANNUO OBBLIGO IN PERPETUO / DI MESSE N° CIIII / ANNIVERSARII N° LXXVIII / UN OFFICIO DI MESSE N° XIII / ECON. MONS.r RMO AND.a SBADACCHIA / DI. T. PROT. APLICO CAN. E TES.”

==== Presbytery and apse area ====
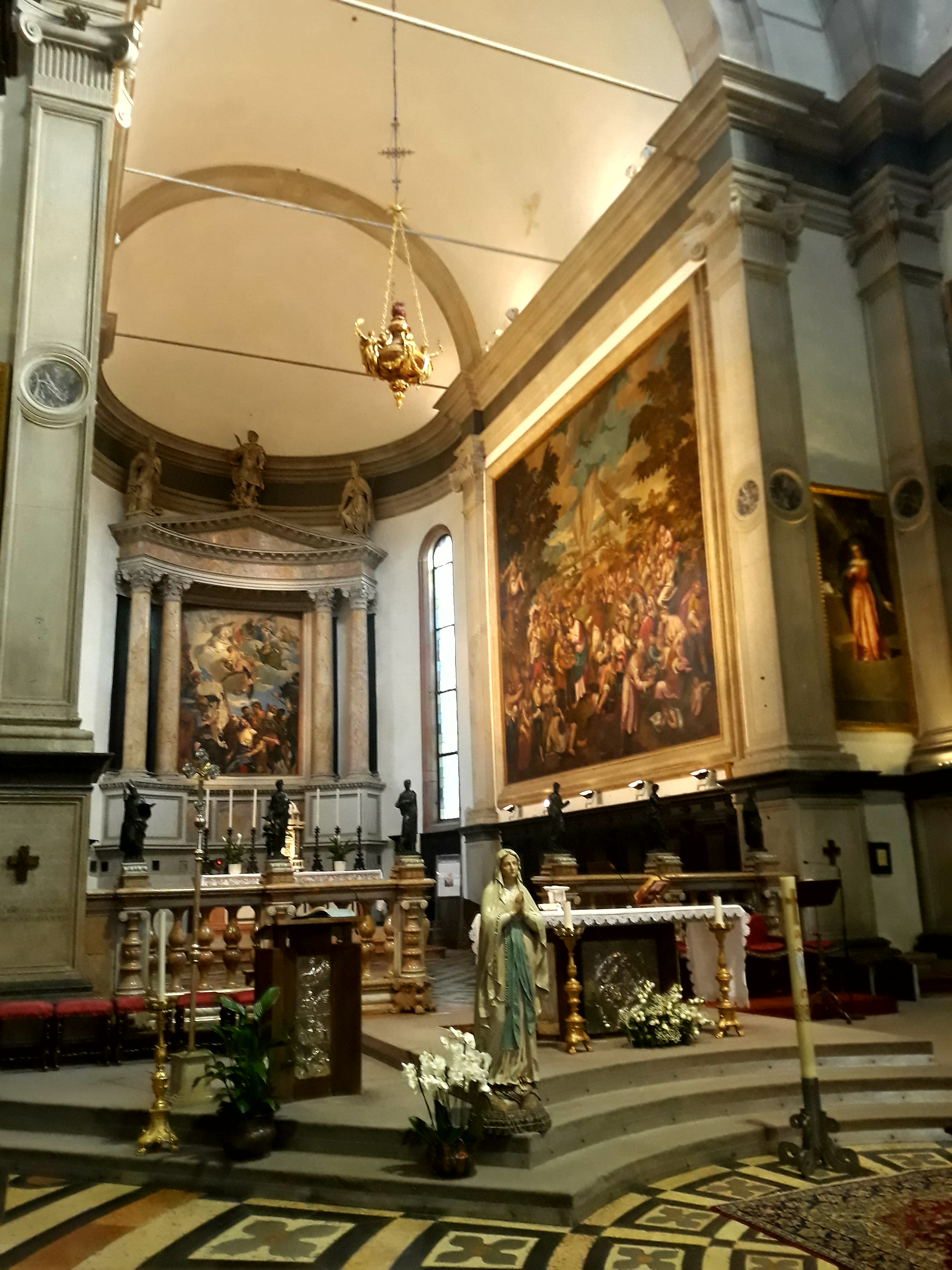
Presbytery of the church.

The presbytery is accessed via three steps in red marble and a balustrade in marble, topped by six bronze statues, of unknown authorship, crafted in Venice in 1625, depicting, from left to right: Saint Luke, Saint Zeno, Saint Matthew, Saint Mark, Saint Lawrence Justinian, and Saint John.

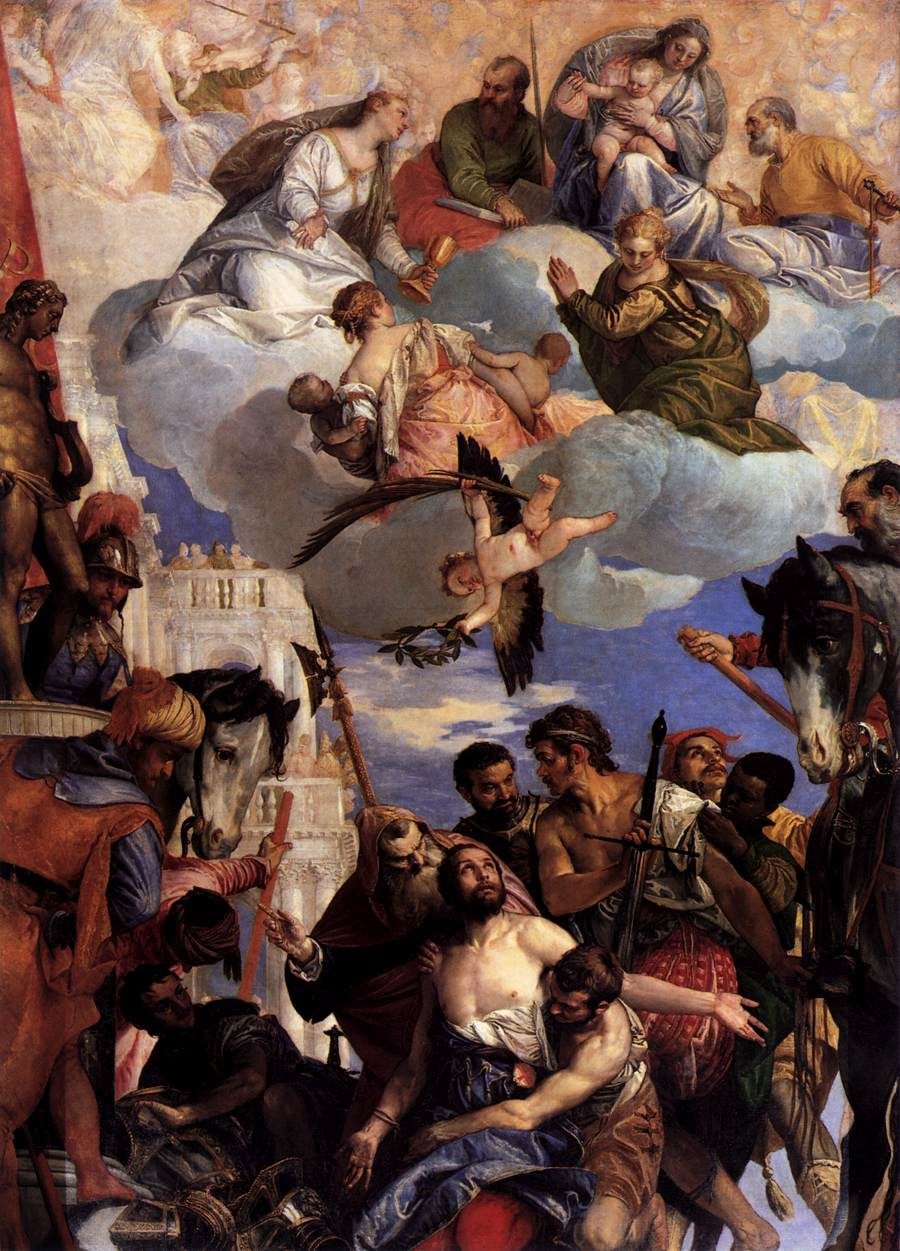
The Martyrdom of Saint George, by Paolo Veronese.

The high altar is simple in design, one of those consecrated on July 31, 1543, by the Greek Bishop Dionysius, though it may have been one of the altars consecrated eight years earlier by Gian Matteo Giberti for the lateral chapels and later removed. The tabernacle dates to 1625. On the left wall is a large canvas (8x7.5 meters) by the Veronese artist Felice Brusasorci, depicting The Fall of Manna in the Desert, completed posthumously by his pupils Pasquale Ottino and Alessandro Turchi (known as “Orbetto”). In front of it is Paolo Farinati's "Multiplication of the Loaves and Fishes", painted in 1603 when he was 79 years old, inscribed: “A.D. MDCIII – PAOLUS FARINATUS / DE UBERTIS F. AETATIS SUAE LXXIX”.

In the apse, a canvas by Paolo Veronese, The Martyrdom of Saint George, looted by French troops in 1797 but later returned, was painted in 1566 when Veronese was in his hometown to marry Elena Badile, daughter of his first teacher Antonio Badile. During World War I, the canvas was stored in Florence for safety. It was damaged when a tear was made in the saint’s right arm and repaired imperfectly, causing the arm to appear unnaturally positioned.

==== Pipe organs ====
The Church of San Giorgio in Braida houses two pipe organs.

The main organ is divided into two sections on the opposing choir lofts beneath the dome, built in 1890 by William George Trice, who reused the wooden case (whose shutters, by the Brescian artist Girolamo Romani, are now detached and placed on the walls opposite the area before the presbytery) and part of the sound material from the 1779 organ by Gaetano Callido, opus 144-145. Restored in 1928 by Domenico Farinati without modifications, it consists of two sections: the main one on the left, within the historic case, and the expressive cases and console on the right. The organ has 26 stops across three manuals and a pedalboard and uses electro-pneumatic transmission.

To the right of the presbytery, at floor level, is a positive organ built by Silvio Micheli in 2013. With fully mechanical transmission, it has 7 stops on a single manual and a pedalboard.

== See also ==
- Monuments of Verona
- Churches of Verona
- Diocese of Verona

== Bibliography ==
- Borelli, Giorgio, ed. (1980). Chiese e monasteri di Verona [Churches and Monasteries of Verona]. Verona: Banca Popolare di Verona. SBL0303338.
- Brugnoli, Pierpaolo (1954). La chiesa di San Giorgio [The Church of San Giorgio]. Le Guide, 5. Verona.
- Brugnoli, Pierpaolo (2014). San Giorgio in Braida. Guide di storia e arte veronese, 1. Editrice La Grafica. ISBN 8869470008.
- Fiorio, Maria Teresa Franco (1971). Giovan Francesco Caroto. Vita Veronese. SBL0451705.
- Marini, Paola; Aikema, Bernard, eds. (2014). Paolo Veronese. L’illusione della realtà (Catalogo della mostra Palazzo della Gran Guardia, Verona, 5 luglio – 5 ottobre 2014) [Paolo Veronese: The Illusion of Reality (Catalog of the Palazzo della Gran Guardia exhibition, Verona, July 5 – October 5, 2014)]. Milano: Mondadori Electa. ISBN 978-88-918-0150-0.
- Lodi, Stefano (2009). San Giorgio in Braida. Architettura e arti figurative a Verona nel Cinquecento [San Giorgio in Braida: Architecture and Figurative Arts in Verona in the Sixteenth Century]. Verona: Editrice La Grafica. ISBN 9788895149158.
- Mazza, Barbara (1974). voce "Bernardino India" in Maestri della pittura veronese a cura di Pierpaolo Brugnoli [Entry "Bernardino India" in Masters of Veronese Painting edited by Pierpaolo Brugnoli]. Banca Mutua Popolare di Verona.
- Tarrini, Maurizio (1993). La fabbrica d'organi di William George Trice a Genova, 1881-1897 [The Organ Factory of William George Trice in Genoa, 1881–1897]. Savona: Liguria. ISBN 88-8055-002-0.
- Viviani, Giuseppe Franco (2004). Chiese nel Veronese [Churches in the Verona area]. Verona: Società cattolica di assicurazione. VIA0121042.
