= Madonna and Child with Saints (Moretto, Verona) =

Painting by Moretto da Brescia

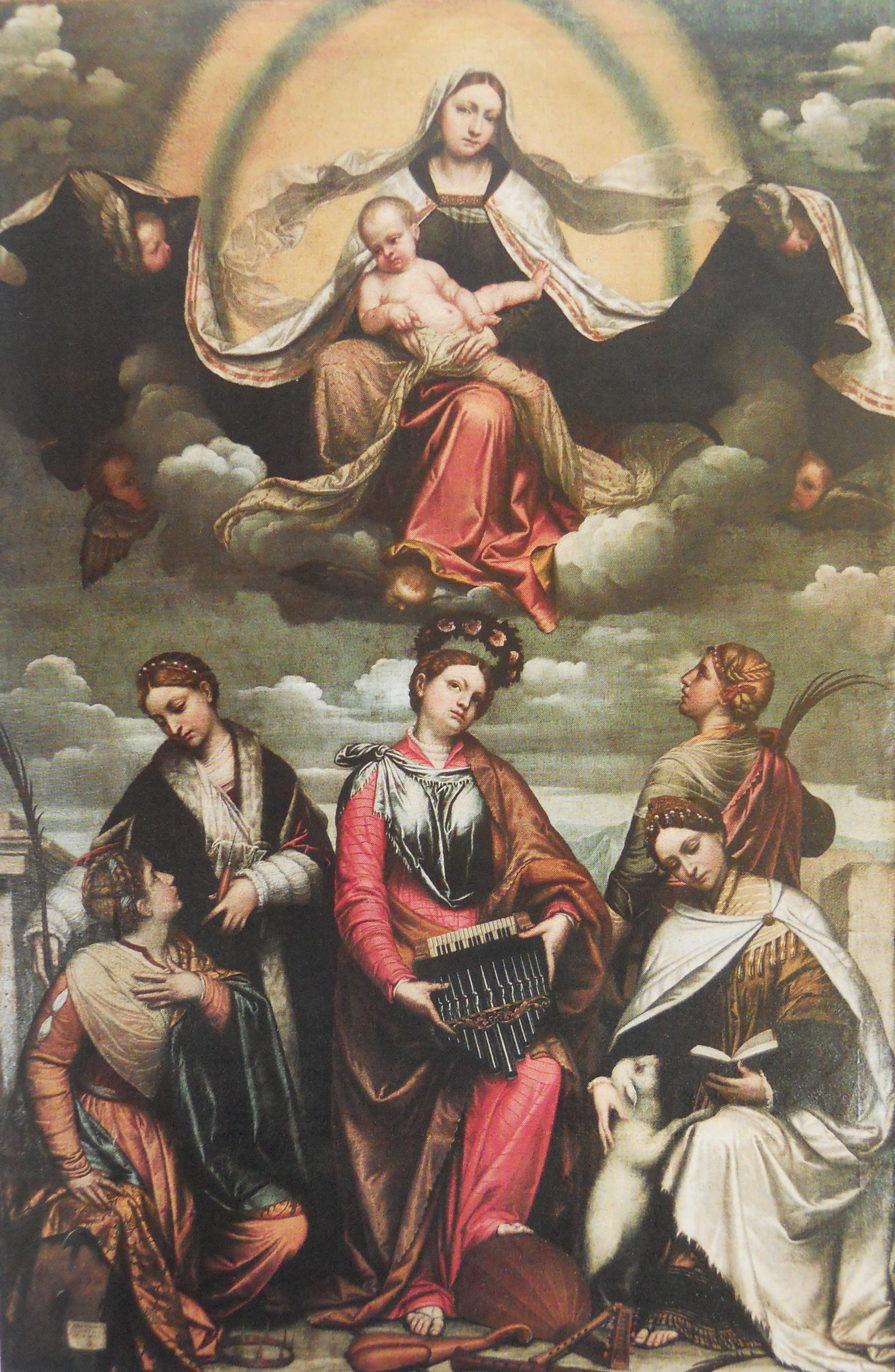
- Artist: Moretto da Brescia
- Year: 1540
- Medium: Oil on canvas
- Dimensions: 288 cm × 193 cm (113 in × 76 in)
- Location: San Giorgio in Braida, Verona

Madonna and Child with Saints is an oil painting on canvas by Moretto da Brescia, executed c. 1540, now displayed on an altar below the organ at the Church of San Giorgio in Braida in Verona, Italy. It shows the female martyrs Catherine of Alexandria, Lucy, Cecilia, Barbara and Agnes. It was commissioned in 1540 by the canons of the San Giorgio Monastery and is still in its original location. It was first recorded in 1648 by Carlo Ridolfi, though he and later sources were not precise as to its location.
