= Giovanni Battista Leonetti (engraver) =

Giovanni Battista Leonetti was an Italian engraver. He worked in Rome at the commencement of the 19th century, and died before 1830. He engraved works by Guercino and Francesco Gessi.
