= Edoardo Lionetti =

Italian sculptor

Edoardo Lionetti (Naples, December 1862- Naples, March 26, 1912) was an Italian sculptor.

After first completing literary studies, he studied art at the Royal Institute of Fine Arts of Naples from 1881 to 1884, where he won two prizes, one for design and the other for sculpture. He dedicated himself to the latter. He exhibited in 1884 in Turin, Nice and at the 1888 Mostra Italiana of London. The Ministry of Finances of Rome once had a Lionetti bronze bust entitled Ride. His Sul lido was acquired by the Society of Fine Arts of Naples. Another work is his Sguardo bieco. He completed many busts and figures in terra cotta, including: Mihif; Eh! eh!; Intontito; and Fra rose. He completed many portraits including that of cavalliere Cola Volpe of Atrani, of the signora D'Amata of Maiori, and of the signora Valente of Terlizzi. For the painter D'Agostino of Salerno, he completed a bas-relief depicting a Virgin of the star and An Alpine Fountain. In 1893, he submitted a statue of the Blind Man of Jericho (Cieco di Gerico) to the Mostra Nazionale in Rome.
