= Giovanni Battista Leonetti =

Giovanni Battista Leonetti (fl. 1604 – c. 1617) was an Italian Augustinian monk, composer, and organist. He trained as a musician under Giovanni Battista Caletti in Crema before taking holy order as an Augustinian monk. After taking his vow, he was appointed organist at Sant'Agostino, Cremona in 1617. The Répertoire International des Sources Musicales has documented several of his compositions, including three six-part madrigals which were published in a 1604 anthology. Two collections of his own compositions, Il primo libro de' madrigali a 5 voci and Missarum octonis vocibus liber primus, were both published in Venice in 1617.
