= Madonna and Child with Saints (Moretto, London) =

Painting by Moretto da Brescia

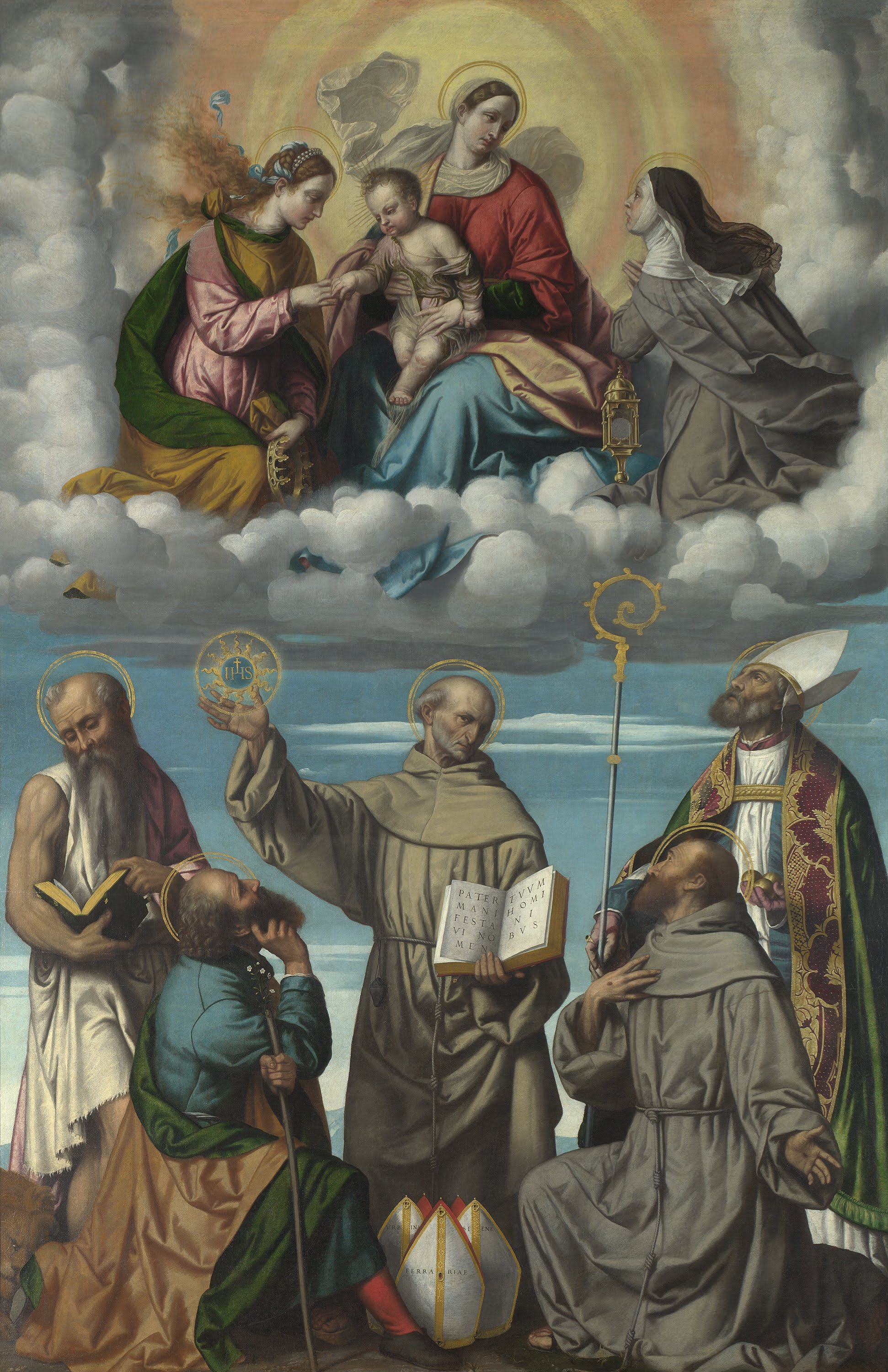
- Artist: Moretto da Brescia
- Year: c. 1540–1545
- Medium: Oil on canvas
- Dimensions: 358 cm × 233 cm (141 in × 92 in)
- Location: National Gallery, London
- Accession: NG625

The Madonna and Child with Saints (or The Virgin and Child with Saint Bernardino and Other Saints) is an oil painting on canvas by Moretto da Brescia, executed c. 1540–1545, in the National Gallery, London.

Its original provenance is unknown, though it was probably painted for a church outside the Brescian context. It was probably for a Franciscan church, given the presence of three Franciscan saints (Francis of Assisi and Bernardino of Siena in the lower register and Clare of Assisi in the upper register). Also in the upper register are Catherine of Alexandria and the Madonna and Child, whilst below (from left to right) are Jerome, Joseph, Bernardino, Francis and Nicholas of Bari.
