= Fra Semplice =

Italian painter

- Fra Semplice da Verona, Portrait of St. Lawrence of Brindisi, c. 1620
- Born: c. 1589; Verona, Republic of Venice
- Died: 11 December 1654; Rome, Papal States
- Other name: Il Cappuccino Veronese
- Education: Felice Riccio
- Known for: Painting
- Movement: Baroque

Fra Semplice da Verona, also known as Il Cappuccino Veronese (c. 1589 – 11 December 1654), was an Italian painter of the Baroque era. His eclectic style draws inspiration from Venetian painting, Correggio, and the Bolognese school. Fra Semplice was a court painter in Mantua and painted numerous altarpieces and frescoes for churches in northern Italy and Rome.

== Biography ==
Fra Semplice was likely born in Verona around 1589. There is no documentary evidence regarding his early life, and neither his secular name nor the details of his education are known. At a very early age, he entered the workshop of Felice Riccio and came into contact with the circle of late Mannerist artists active in Verona – a group that included, among others, Pasquale Ottini, Alessandro Turchi, and Marco Antonio Bassetti.

He had probably completed his artistic training by the time he entered the Capuchin novitiate on 25 August 1613. The following year, he took his vows at the Capuchin convent in Verona. Fra Felice served in various churches and convents belonging to his order across different regions of Italy, coming into contact with diverse cultural currents and painting techniques. His earliest surviving works date from 1621: The Rest on the Flight into Egypt and The Annunciation for the Capuchin church in Fontevivo, Parma. Fra Semplice came to stylistic maturity working for the courts of the Po Valley. On 23 July 1621, having received a dispensation from the Superior General of his order, he moved to the court of Ferdinando Gonzaga in Mantua. Works from this period include the Deposition of Christ, gifted by Ferdinando to Duchess Caterina de’ Medici (Florence, Uffizi), and Saint Francis Receiving the Christ Child from the Virgin Mary (Mantua, Palazzo d’Arco). Both pieces reveal the influence of Domenico Fetti, an artist who exerted a significant influence in the Duchy of Mantua during those years. On behalf of Ferdinando, Semplice participated in the decoration of the Villa La Favorita. For the villa, he created one of his most important works, The Ousting of the Unworthy Guest, a figural translation of the Parable of the Great Banquet (Matthew 22:1–14; Luke 14:15–24). The painting displays the influence of the crowded Renaissance canvases of Paolo Veronese, but also of contemporary Northern Italian illusionistic painting. It was purchased by Charles I through his agent Daniel Nijs in 1627, and became part of the Royal Collection. The piece has recently returned to Mantua, and become part of the Lubiam private collection.

Altarpiece by Fra Semplice for the Church of Sant'Antonio da Padova, Conegliano

In October 1622, Fra Semplice was granted leave by Duke Ferdinando and moved to Genoa to study the paintings of Luca Cambiaso. From there, he travelled to Rome, where he remained until the end of 1625, working exclusively for the Capuchin Order. The most notable commission he undertook during this period was the large canvas The Apparition of the Virgin Mary to Blessed Felix of Cantalice, delivered to the Church of San Bonaventura al Palatino in October 1625, on the occasion of the celebrations for Felix of Cantalice's beatification. From that point on, documentation regarding Fra Semplice becomes extremely scarce. He certainly returned to the Republic of Venice, where, in 1631, he painted Saint Francis and Saint Anthony in Castelfranco, and two canvases depicting the same subjects in Vicenza. That same year, he painted the Supper at Emmaus for the Capuchin Church of Badia Polesine, Rovigo. In 1632, he completed Dead Christ Supported by an Angel (Vicenza, Palazzo Chiericati), and Blessed Felix Receiving the Christ Child from the Virgin Mary (Padua, Sanctuary of Leopold Mandic).

In 1636, the Capuchins of Fontevivo summoned him back to Parma to complete the decoration of their church. For this project, he painted The Virgin Mary Presenting the Christ Child to Blessed Felix of Cantalice (Mantua, Palazzo d'Arco), The Agony in the Garden, and The Road to Calvary (Milan, Museo Poldi Pezzoli). In 1644, he decorated the chapel of the Counts Da Prato in Domegliara, Verona. All that remains of this work is an altarpiece depicting the Annunciation with Saints Francis and Anthony Abbot. Around the same time, he also produced a notable Pietà, which for the Capuchin convent in Ala. In his later works, Semplice turned towards more formalized, formulaic compositions. Examples include the Trinity with Saints Bartholomew and Bernard of Clairvaux for the Capuchin Abbey in Lugano and two paintings depicting Saint Paul the Hermit and Saint Bonaventure for the church of San Francesco in Mendrisio, executed around 1650. Semplice died in Rome on 11 December 1654, as recorded in the necrology of the Roman province of the Capuchin Order.

== Sources ==
- Bernasconi, Cesare (1864). Studi sopra la storia della pittura italiana dei secoli XIV e XV e della scuola pittorica veronese dai medi tempi fino tutto il secolo XVIII. Verona: A. Rossi. p. 365.
- Nicolson, Benedict (1946). "Fra Semplice da Verona". The Burlington Magazine. 88 (524): 278–279. JSTOR 869414.
- Manzatto, Luigi (1973). Fra Semplice da Verona, pittore del Seicento. Verona: Edizioni Laurenziane.
- "Semplicio also known as Semplice da Verona, Called Il Cappuccino Veronese". Benezit Dictionary of Artists. Oxford: Oxford University Press. 2011. doi:10.1093/benz/9780199773787.article.B00167536.
- Furlotti, Barbara; Rebecchini, Guido (2008). The Art of Mantua: Power and Patronage in the Renaissance. Translated by A. Lawrence Jenkins. Los Angeles: Getty Publications. ISBN 978-0892368402.
- Polati, Andrea (2018). "SEMPLICE da Verona fra". Dizionario Biografico degli Italiani (in Italian). Vol. 92: Semino–Sisto IV. Rome: Institute of the Italian Encyclopaedia. ISBN 978-88-12-00032-6.
