= Palazzo D'Arco, Mantua =

Palace in Lombardy, Italy

Coordinates: 45.1613°N 10.7888°E

The Palazzo D'Arco is a Neoclassical-style palace located on Piazza Carlo D'Arco #4 in Mantua, region of Lombardy, Italy. The palace houses the Museo di Palazzo d'Arco, which displays the furnishings and artwork collected by the Duke D'Arco.

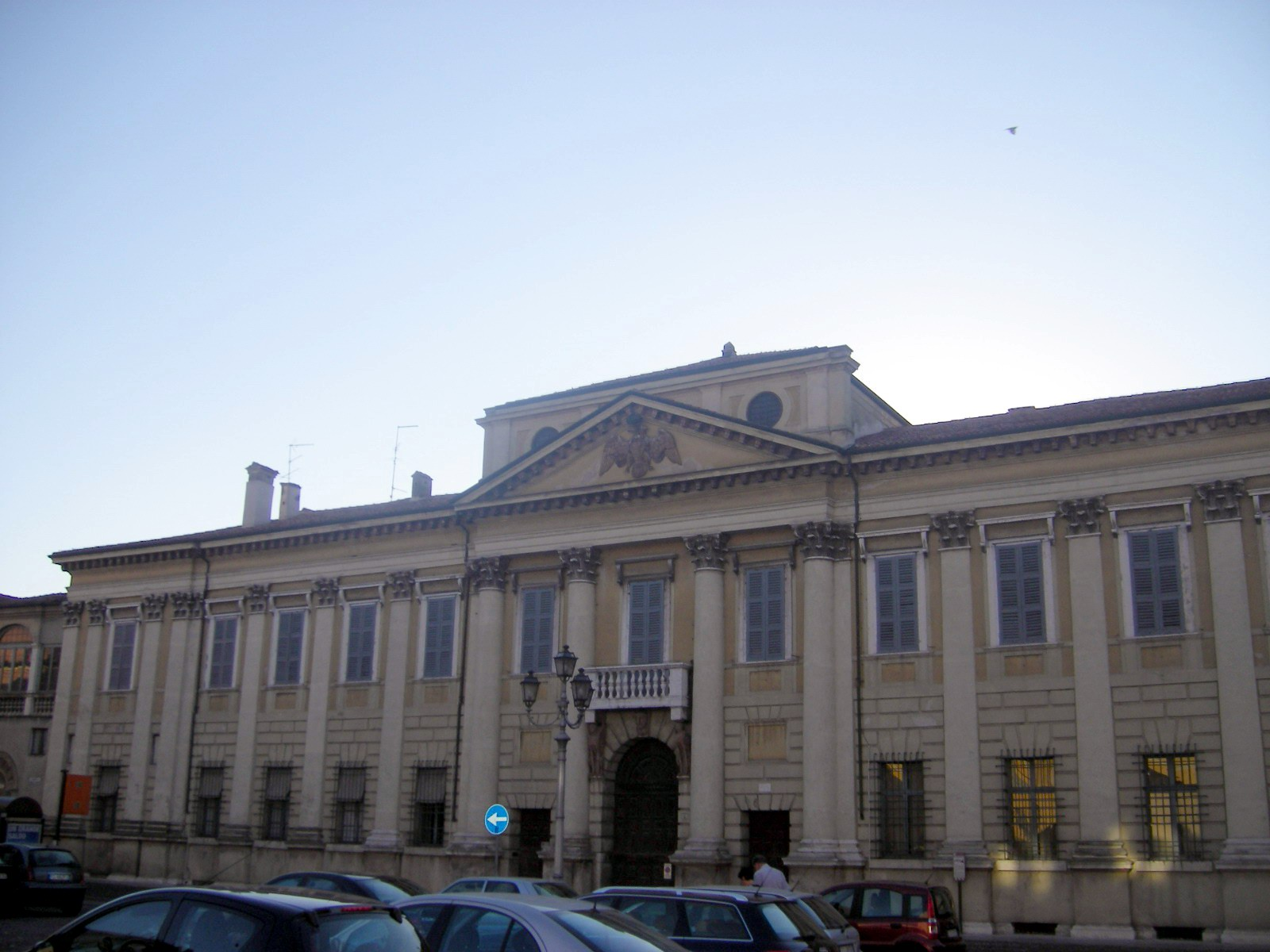
Palace façade

== History ==
The site had once likely housed a royal palace in the 12th-century. The palace we see today is a reconstruction around a series of earlier buildings, with a long and complex history.

The facade has elements that include the coat of arm of the D'Arco and Chieppio families, and also displays in the tympanum the Habsburg double-headed eagle of the then Austrian rulers of Lombardy.

In 1872 the building was enlarged further by Francesco Antonio d'Arco, by buying the neighboring Marquis Dalla Valle's palace.

The line ownership to the D'Arco family, can vaguely be linked to about 1625 when Count Annibale Chieppio. minister of the Duke of Mantua, bought and expanded the palace. By 1652, the palace had 63 rooms. When the Chieppio line died without male heirs, the palace passed in 1740 to a sister, Teresa married to Francesco Alberto d’Arco. Their son, Giovanni Battista Gherardo d’Arco, prefect of the Mantuan Academy of Sciences and Fine Arts, commissioned Antonio Colonna in 1783 to rebuild the facade in a neoclassical style.

The palace was bombed during World War Two. When the last member of the family, contessa Giovanna d'Arco Chieppio Ardizzoni, died, her will left the palace and its collections to a foundation for use as a museum.

== Collections ==
The museum collections include furniture, ceramic, paintings and a grand library.

The painting collection includes work by Niccolo’ da Verona, Followers of Pieter Aertsen and Gioachim Buenckelaer; Ludovico Costa il Vecchio and Ludovico Costa il Giovane; il Sodoma (attribution); Sebastien Bourdon; Ludovico Toeput; Annibale Carraci; Frans Pourbus the Younger; Bernardino Luini; Giuseppe Bazzani; Santo Peranda; Guglielmo Caccia; Alessandro Magnasco; Lorenzo Lotto; Tintoretto; Antonio della Corna; Pasquale Ottino; Giovanni Maria Perego (attributed); Fra Semplice da Verona; Giulio Carpioni; Margherita Caffi (attributed); Frans Geffels (attributed); Matteo Ghidoni; Francesco Noletti; Jacob Denys; Orazio Samacchini; Giovanni Francesco Maineri (copy); Boccaccio Boccaccino; studio of Piazzetta; studio of Bernardino and Francesco Zaganelli; Pietro Muttoni; Alessandro Turchi; Giovanni Francesco Castiglione (attributed); Sebastiano Mazzoni; Daniele Crespi (attributed); Pandolfo Reschi (attributed); Bartolomeo Manfredi; Joann Kupetzki; Michele Desubleo (attributed); Antonio Carneo (attributed); Agostino Bonisoli (attributed); Giovanni Battista Venanzi; Felice Boselli; Gilardo da Lodi; Giambettino Cignaroli; Bartolomeo Pedon; Pier Francesco Guala (attributed); School of Giovanni Battista Crespi; Giovanni Peruzzini; Tomasso Porta; Luigi Miradori; van Dyck; Jan Wildens; Rubens (attributed); Nicola Casissa; Giovanni Andrea Urbani; Gerolamo Induno; and Bartolomeo Nazzari.

The collection of Bazzani paintings numbers nearly nine canvases.

One of the masterpieces in the house is the frescoed room of Sala dello Zodiaco (Zodiac Room) painted by Renaissance painter Giovanni Maria Falconetto, in the early 16th century.

The library includes a collection of natural history, a period kitchen, a large library, and a collection of period musical instruments.
