= Santo Stefano, Verona =

Church in Verona, Italy

Coordinates: 45.4488°N 11.0000°E

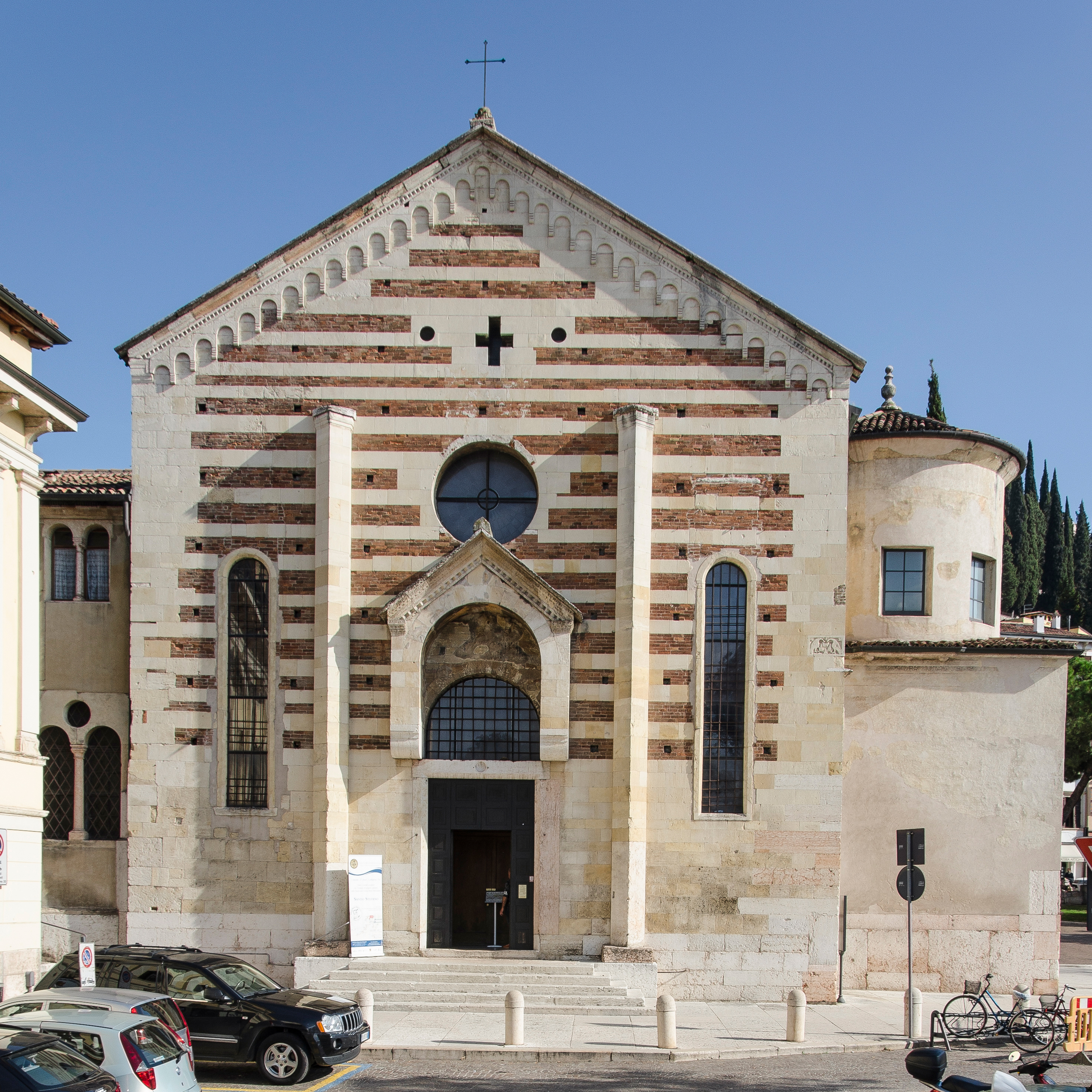
Façade

Santo Stefano is a Paleo-Christian, Roman Catholic basilica church in central Verona, Veneto, Italy.

== History ==
A church at this site, built on top of a Roman temple dedicated to Isis, was consecrated in 421, and for four centuries was the burial site for the bishops of Verona. For a time, this served as the city's cathedral. The church was partially damaged during the earthquake of 1117, and was subsequently rebuilt in the Romanesque style.

The façade is made up of rows of soft stone and brick. The crypt was built in the 10th century. The four central dark granite columns are of Egyptian origin. The octagonal lantern with a double row of mullioned windows is an example of Lombard Romanesque. The belltower contains six bells in F#, hung for Veronese bellringing art

The two-storey apse has elements from the early Christian era and from the early Middle Ages.

An inventory of 1750 noted that the main altarpiece and the choir were decorated by Domenico Brusasorzi. Martino da Verona's Annunciation and Coronation of the Virgin is located in the left transept. The Tribune was frescoed by Bernardo Muttoni. Some figures above the main altar were painted by Santo Prunati; however the ceiling and the dome frescoes were mainly by Brusasorzi. He also painted an Adoration of the Magi for the first altar to right. The next altar on the right had a work by Giulio Carpioni the Younger, a relative of Giulio Carpioni.

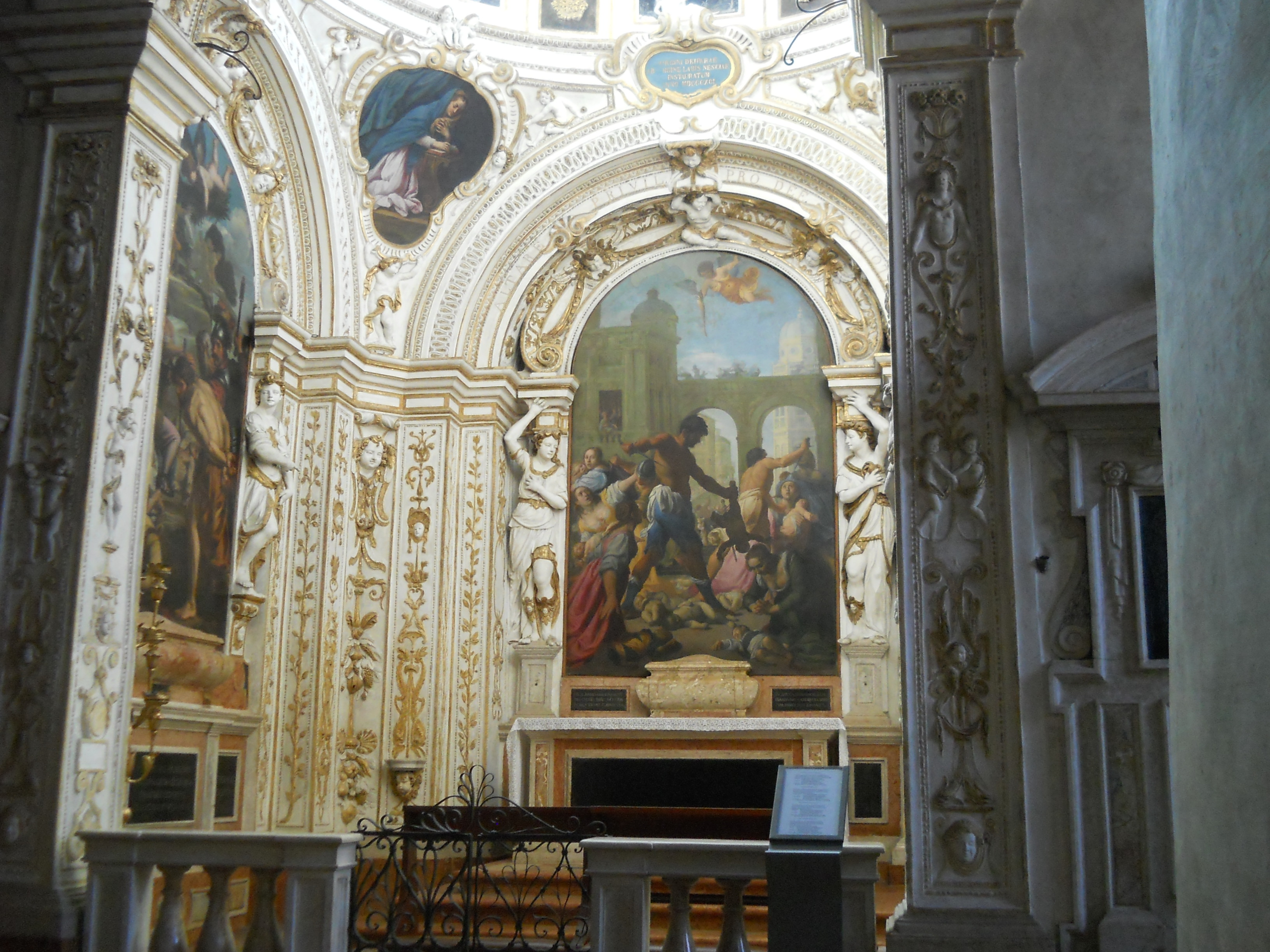
Massacre of the Innocents by Ottino

The Chapel of the Innocents was commissioned around 1618 by the parish priest, Monsignor Varalli. It was built in Baroque style along the southern wall to the right of the entrance. It has an altarpiece by Pasquale Ottino depicting the Massacre of the Innocents and a Martyrdom of the Forty Martyrs by Alessandro Turchi (L'Orbetto). There are also frescoes by Marcantonio Bassetti, and an Annuciation and frescoes of Saint Charles and Saint Francis by Ottino.

The first altar on the left had a canvas depicting the Virgin and Child with Saints Peter and Andrew by Giovanni Francesco Caroto. To the sides of this altarpiece were paintings of Melchisidech and the Sacrifice of Isaac by Francesco Barbieri. The second altar had a Virgin and Child with Saints Jerome, Francis, Mauro, Simplicio, and Placido by Niccolo Giolfino. A frescoed lunette was completed by Giovanni Battista dal Moro.

In the last altar on left is a Virgin and Child with Saints Joseph, John the Baptist, Francis, and Anthony of Padua by Alessandro Marchesini, and a Virgin and Child with Saints Vincent, Stephen, Anthony Abbot, and Francis of Paola by Santo Prunati. Next to that altar was a Pentecost by Orazio Farinati.

The crypt has frescoes by Giulio Carpioni the Younger (of the Visitation and the Rest on the Flight into Egypt), Paolo Cimengoli (of the Annunciation); and Santo Prunati (of the Nativity). It formerly also had a copy of a work by Raphael.
