= Giovanni Ceschini =

Italian painter

Giovanni Ceschini (active Verona, circa 1590–1640) was an Italian painter in Verona. He trained under Alessandro Turchi.
