= Paolo Zimengoli =

Italian painter

Paolo Zimengoli or Cimengoli (active 1717 -1720) was an Italian painter of the Baroque style, active in his native Verona and Bergamo.

He was a figure painter, mainly of sacred subjects, including a frescoed lunette in the crypt of the church of San Stefano, in Sant'Andrea di Romagnano, and in the church of San Marco. It is unclear who was his master.
