= Marco Antonio Bassetti =

Italian painter

- Portrait of an Old Man with Gloves, Castelvecchio Museum, Verona
- Born: 17 January 1586; Verona, Republic of Venice
- Died: 1630 (aged 43–44); Verona, Republic of Venice
- Education: Felice Ricci
- Occupation: Painter
- Movement: Venetian school

Marco Antonio Bassetti (17 January 1586 – 1630) was an Italian High Baroque painter from the city of Verona. Together with his contemporaries Pasquale Ottini and Alessandro Turchi, he helped make Verona a focal point of Caravaggio-inspired painting.

== Biography ==
=== Early life and education ===
Born in Verona in 1586, Bassetti was a pupil of the late-Renaissance painter Felice Riccio, known as Il Brusasorci. He completed his education in Venice, where he was particularly influenced by the works of Tintoretto, Paolo Veronese and Jacopo Bassano. Bassetti began his career in Verona, were he lived until the mid-1610s. To this early period probably date the Portrait of a Man with Gloves (Verona, Castelvecchio Museum) and the full-length St. Peter and St. Paul painted on slate (also in Verona, Castelvecchio Museum). The Good Samaritan (1614; Christ Church, Oxford), is probably the last work he carried out in his native city. In 1616, Bassetti moved to Rome with his fellow Veronese painters Pasquale Ottini and Alessandro Turchi, probably at the invitation of the Venetian painter Carlo Saraceni.

In Rome Bassetti came under the influence of Caravaggio and Orazio Borgianni. His Paradise (Naples, Museo di Capodimonte), probably commissioned before 1621 by Cardinal Pietro Aldobrandini, is derived from Saraceni’s painting on the same subject (New York, Metropolitan Museum of Art), itself based on a painting by Francesco Bassano the Younger (the Adoration of the Holy Trinity, 1592; Rome, Church of the Gesù). Bassetti's use of pigment and treatment of light are closer to the style of Bassano and have been compared to Giovanni Serodine's work.

Other paintings from this period include the Deposition (Rome, Galleria Borghese), influenced by Caravaggio’s Conversion of Saint Paul (Rome, Santa Maria del Popolo) and Borgianni’s Pietà (Rome, Galleria Spada). Between 1616 and 1617 Bassetti frescoed scenes from the Life of Moses in the ovals of the Sala Regia of the Quirinal Palace, where he worked together with Alessandro Turchi under the direction of Saraceni and Giovanni Lanfranco. While still influenced by late Venetian Mannerism these frescoes betray an indebtedness to the dramatic power of Caravaggio's style. Bassetti’s Incredulity of St. Thomas (Verona, Castelvecchio Museum), a copy of a painting by Caravaggio formerly in the New Palace, Potsdam (destr.), again reveals the influence of the Lombard master. To this period dates also the Dead Christ supported by the Virgin Mary and Mary Magdalene (c. 1616), painted on slate, now in the collection of the Fitzwilliam Museum, Cambridge. The use of oil on black marble, a technique perfected by Sebastiano del Piombo, creates a dark, reflective background that highlights the dramatic atmosphere of the scene.

=== Mature work ===
Around 1619 Bassetti sent a large altarpiece (Five Bishop Martyr Saints) from Rome to Verona for the Veraldi Chapel in Santo Stefano; the work is of great structural complexity and it, too, displays markedly Caravaggesque qualities. To the same period dates the altarpiece of the Martyrdom of Saint Vitus with St. Wolfgang and St. George (Alte Pinakothek, Munich) for the Augustinian church in Munich, which accompanied an altarpiece by Saraceni commissioned by the count palatine Sebastian Füll von Windach. In this painting the contrast between the foreground and the luminous area immediately above it betrays a close relationship with the works of Domenico Fetti.

Around 1620 Bassetti moved back to Verona. Paintings that can be dated to the period immediately following his return include St. Anthony Reading (Verona, Castelvecchio Museum), where the simplified volumes and planes of light and shade are explicitly Caravaggesque; the Portrait of a Nun (Verona, Castelvecchio Museum), which softens the Caravaggesque elements; and the Portrait of an Old Man with a Book (1626; Verona, Castelvecchio Museum), distinguished by its unpretentious, direct naturalism, which became an increasingly important element of Bassetti’s style. This picture can be linked to the probably contemporary and powerfully naturalistic Portrait of a Man with a Dog (Lisbon, Cudell Goetz priv. col.).

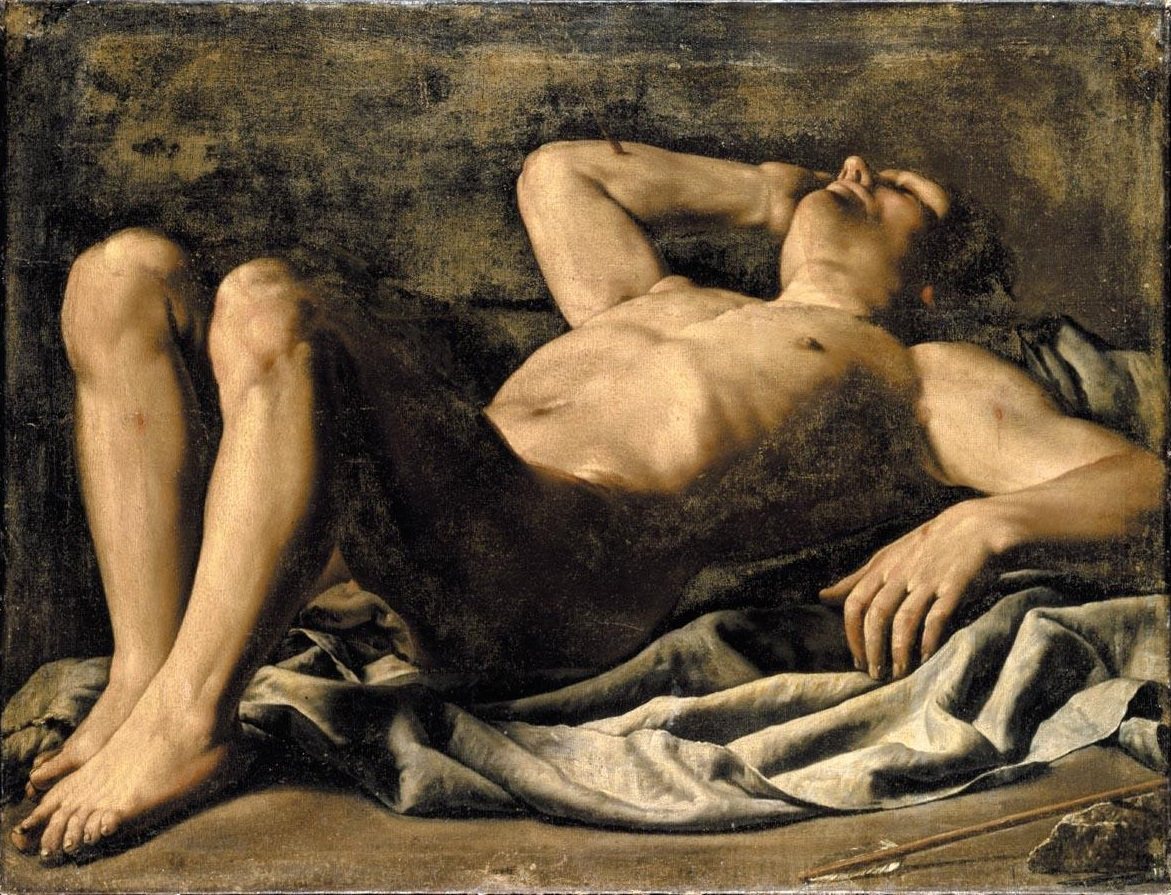
Study for St. Sebastian, 1620, priv. col.

The Danaë (Milan, priv. col.) and St. Sebastian (priv. col.), two of the few examples of Bassetti’s nudes, epitomize the contrasting aspects of his style. The Danaë is indebted to the erotic mythological paintings of Palma il Giovane, yet the body, unusually shown from the back, breaks with Mannerist formulae, and betrays the influence of the style of Giovanni Baglione and Borgianni. The crude, blinding light that plays on the naked flesh, creates a sense of powerful physical presence that is also reminiscent of the work of Caravaggio. Ruggeri compares the work with the dramatic paintings of late-Mannerist Lombard painter Tanzio da Varallo.

The Danaë, however, remains exceptional; Bassetti’s middle and late period in Verona was devoted mainly to religious paintings. Many of these reveal a strong influence from Domenico Fetti. Through Fetti, Bassetti began to reassess his neo-Venetian and Caravaggesque style and took a new interest in narrative and in the problem of conveying the emotional and moral meaning of religious subjects through a more immediate and accessible expressive language. The cultured and élite art of Caravaggio was no longer adequate for this purpose, and Bassetti needed to forge a new style.

=== Later work ===
Bassetti's late paintings, which sometimes seem strange because of the powerful immediacy of their devotional message, were, however, almost always achieved only by sacrificing the quality that gave his earlier works their impact. In the great altarpiece of the Virgin Interceding with her Son (Povegliano, Veneto, parish church) the tiered structure of the earlier Five Bishop Martyr Saints in the Veraldi Chapel and of the altarpiece in Munich is impoverished and trivialized by clumsy articulation. The Adoration of the Shepherds (Carpi, Severi priv. col.) and the Pentecost (Milan, Saibene priv. col.) have similar characteristics, and derive their compositions from 16th-century Venetian prototypes. The Birth of the Virgin in the Camaldola di Avesa, where the composition is still based on the paintings of Palma, and the St. Charles and other Saints (Alcenago, parish church) are both powerful and solemn, distinguished by a more flowing style very different from Bassetti’s earlier refined technique. While this may be due to his search for a more popular art, there is also a clear decline in quality.

Other late works, such as the Coronation of the Virgin (Sant'Anastasia, Verona), are again influenced by Fetti and return to a more expressive style, using light and shade to dissolve the solidity of the Caravaggesque forms and to create striking neo-Venetian works. In contrast to the violent, even coarse, style of his later work, his portraiture retains a certain sobriety and restraint. Bassetti died from the plague in Verona in 1630, aged 43. Among his pupils were Fra Semplice and Paolo Massimo.

== Works (selection) ==
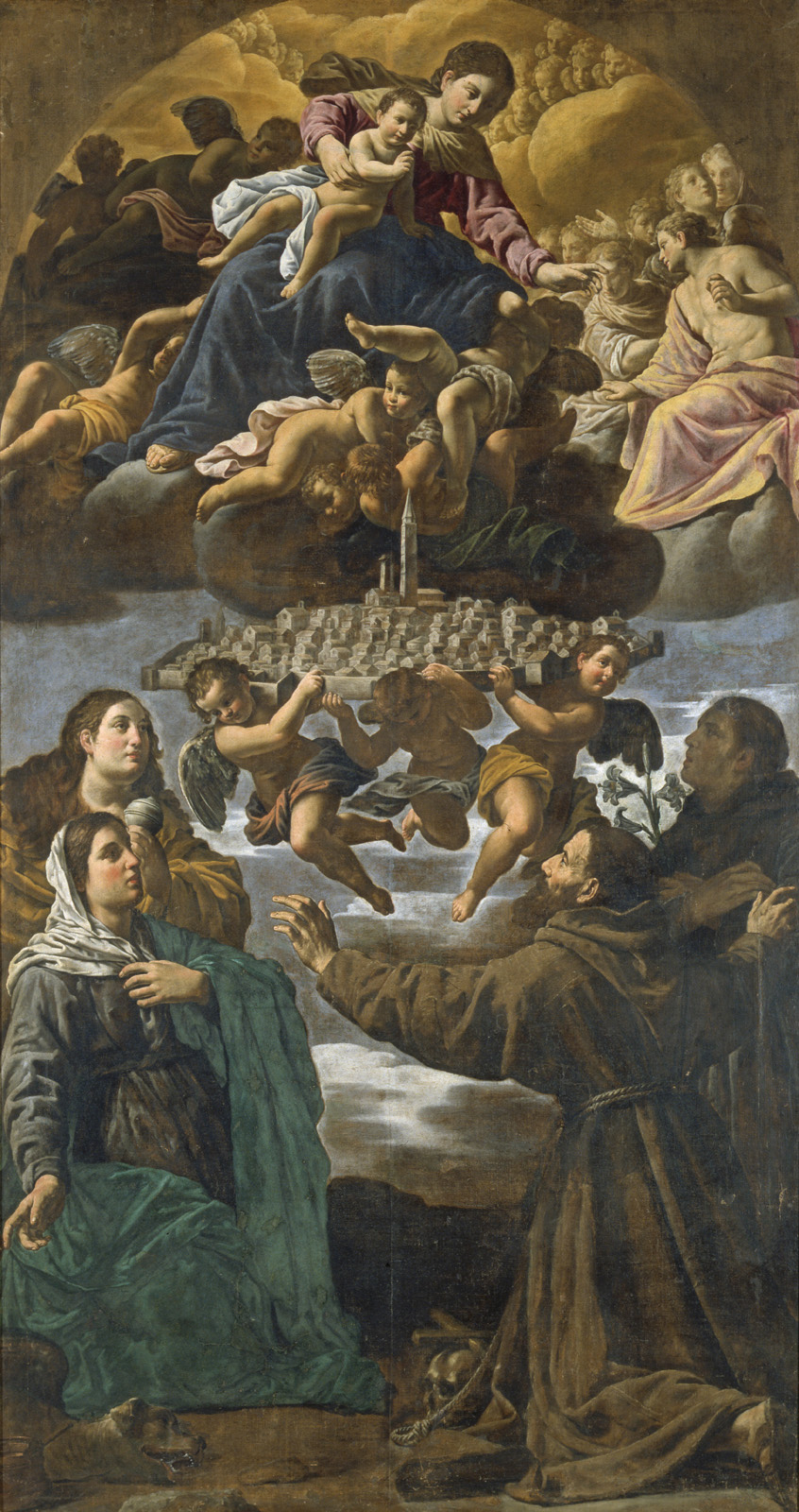
The Mother of God with Saints, Patrons of Koper (c. 1627), Assumption Cathedral, Koper

- The Good Samaritan (1614), Christ Church, Oxford.
- The Incredulity of Thomas (c. 1616), Verona, Castelvecchio Museum.
- Life of Moses (1616–17), Quirinal Palace, Rome.
- Dead Christ supported by the Virgin Mary and Mary Magdalene (c. 1616), Fitzwilliam Museum, Cambridge.
- Five Bishop Martyr Saints (1619), Veraldi Chapel in Santo Stefano, Verona.
- Martyrdom of Saint Vitus with Saints Wolfgang and George, 1619, Alte Pinakothek, Munich.
- Study for Saint Sebastian (1620), priv. col.
- Saint Anthony Reading (1620), Verona, Castelvecchio Museum.
- Assumption of the Virgin Mary (1620), Saint Emmeram, Geisenfeld.
- Saint Sebastian Tended by Saint Irene (c. 1620), Musée des beaux-arts de Marseille.
- Paradise (c. 1621), Naples, Museo di Capodimonte.
- Adoration of the Shepherds (1621–1623), Severi priv. col., Carpi.
- Virgin Interceding with her Son (1621–1625), Povegliano, Veneto, parish church.
- Portrait of a Nun (1626), Castelvecchio Museum, Verona.
- Old Man with a Book (1626), Verona, Castelvecchio Museum.
- Portrait of a Man with a Dog (1626), Cudell Goetz priv. col., Lisbon.
- The Mother of God with Saints, Patrons of Koper (c. 1627), Assumption Cathedral, Koper.
- Birth of the Virgin (c. 1627), Camaldola di Avesa.
- Saint Charles and other Saints (c. 1627), Alcenago, parish church.
- Coronation of the Virgin (1628), Sant'Anastasia, Verona.
Portrait of an Old Man with a Book, Verona, Castelvecchio Museum.

The Incredulity of Thomas, Castelvecchio Museum.

Saint Anthony Reading, Castelvecchio Museum.

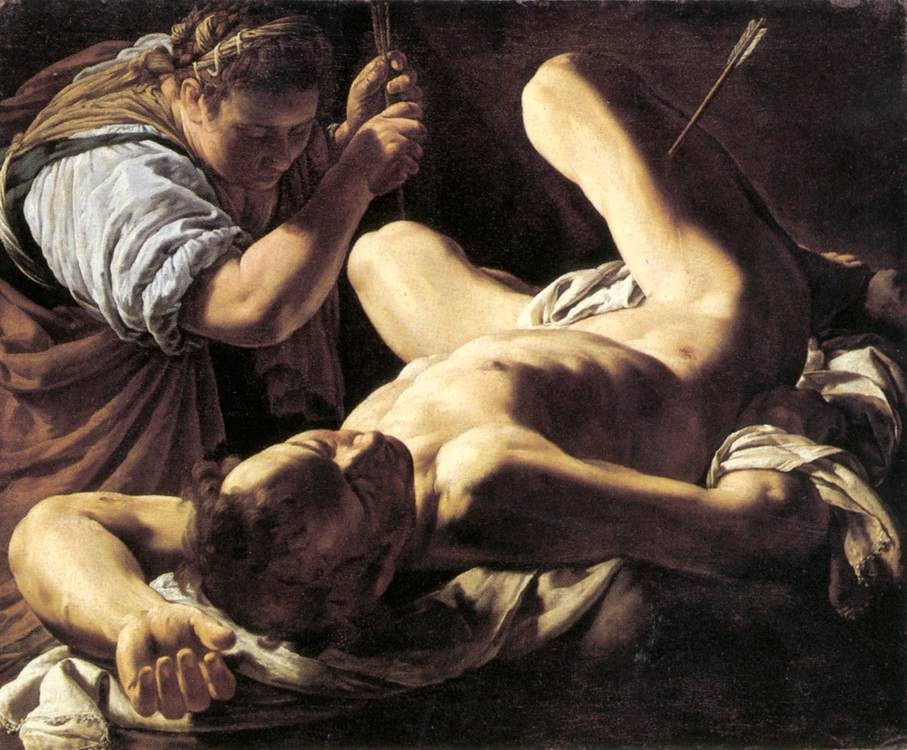
Saint Sebastian Tended by Saint Irene, Musée des beaux-arts de Marseille.

The Dead Christ Supported by the Virgin Mary and Mary Magdalene, Cambridge, Fitzwilliam Museum.

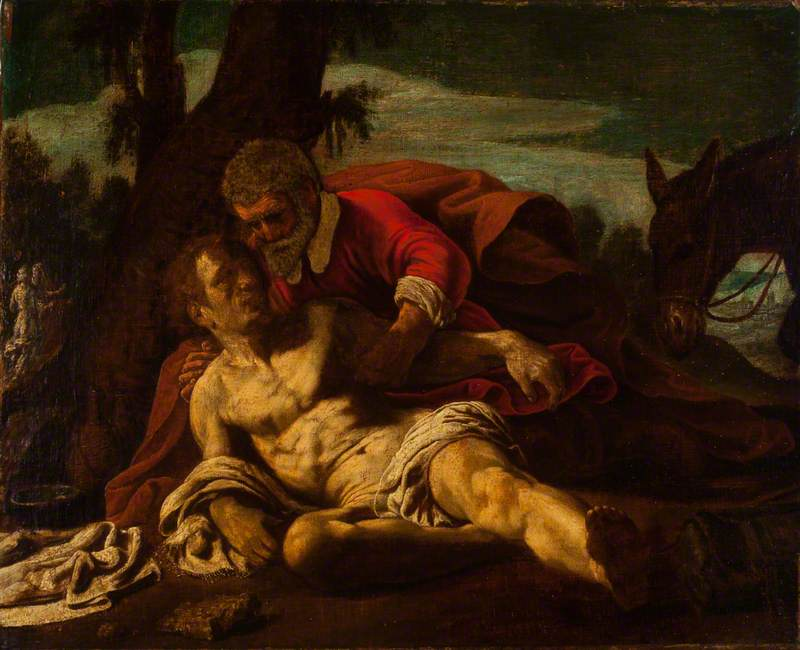
The Good Samaritan, Christ Church, Oxford.

== Sources ==
- Bernasconi, Cesare (1864). Studi sopra la storia della pittura italiana dei secoli XIV e XV e della scuola pittorica veronese dai medi tempi fino tutto il secolo XVIII (in Italian). Verona: Antonio Rossi.
- Bryan, Michael (1886). Robert Edmund Graves (ed.). Dictionary of Painters and Engravers, Biographical and Critical. Vol. I: A-K. London: George Bell and Sons. p. 92.
- Fantelli, Pier Luigi (1974). "Marcantonio Bassetti". In Pierpaolo Brugnoli (ed.). Maestri della pittura veronese (in Italian). Verona: Banca mutua popolare di Verona.
- Ivanoff, Nicola (1965). "Bassetti, Marcantonio". Dizionario Biografico degli Italiani (in Italian). Vol. 7: Bartolucci–Bellotto. Rome: Institute of the Italian Encyclopaedia. ISBN 978-88-12-00032-6.
- Lester Carissimi; Christian Lapeyre, eds. (1998). An Exhibition of Italian Old Master Drawings and Oil Sketches. Exh. cat. New York: Pandora Old Masters Inc.
- Ruggeri, Ugo (2003). "Bassetti, Marcantonio". Grove Art Online. Oxford: Oxford University Press. doi:10.1093/gao/9781884446054.article.T006792.
- "Bassetti, Marcantonio or Marco". Benezit Dictionary of Artists. Oxford: Oxford University Press. 2011. doi:10.1093/benz/9780199773787.article.B00013231.
- Dossi, Davide (2015). "Tra Venezia e Roma: il 'Buon Samaritano' di Marcantonio Bassetti conservato a Oxford". Bollettino d'Arte (in Italian). 100 (28): 81–86. doi:10.1093/benz/9780199773787.article.B00013231.
