= Bartolomeo Pedon =

Italian painter

Bartolomeo Pedon (Venice, 1665- Venice, 1732) was an Italian painter of the late-Baroque period.

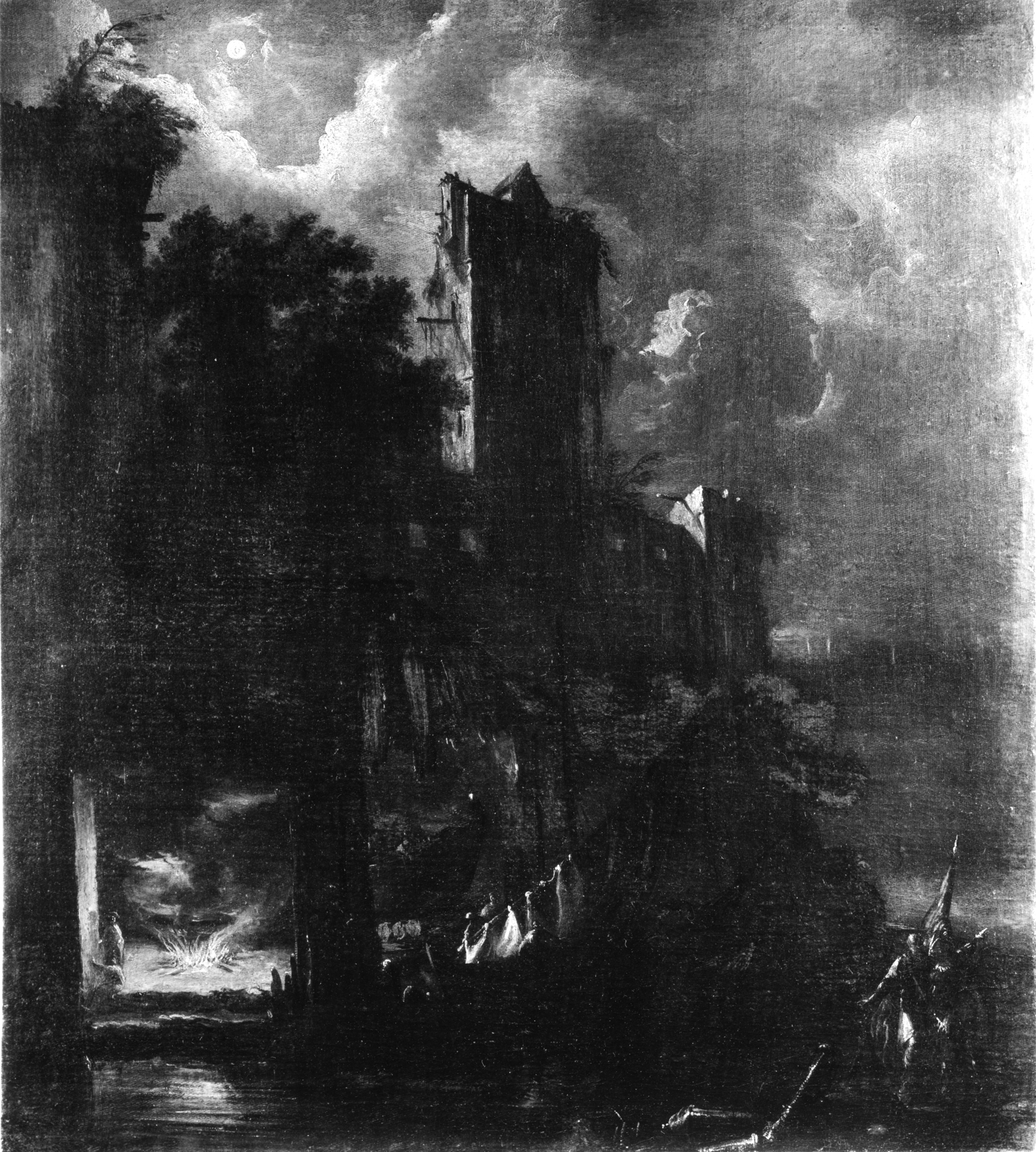
Moonlit Landscape with Ruined Castle from Walters Art Museum, Baltimore.

He mainly painted landscapes, often nocturnes or whimsical architecture capricci in a wild landscape. In this he appears to be influenced by Marco Ricci and Antonio Marini, but also by Magnasco and Salvatore Rosa. Many of his works are still in private hands.

Other sources say he was born in 1655 in Padua, and worked in Monastery of San Benedetto.
