= Felice Riccio =

Italian painter

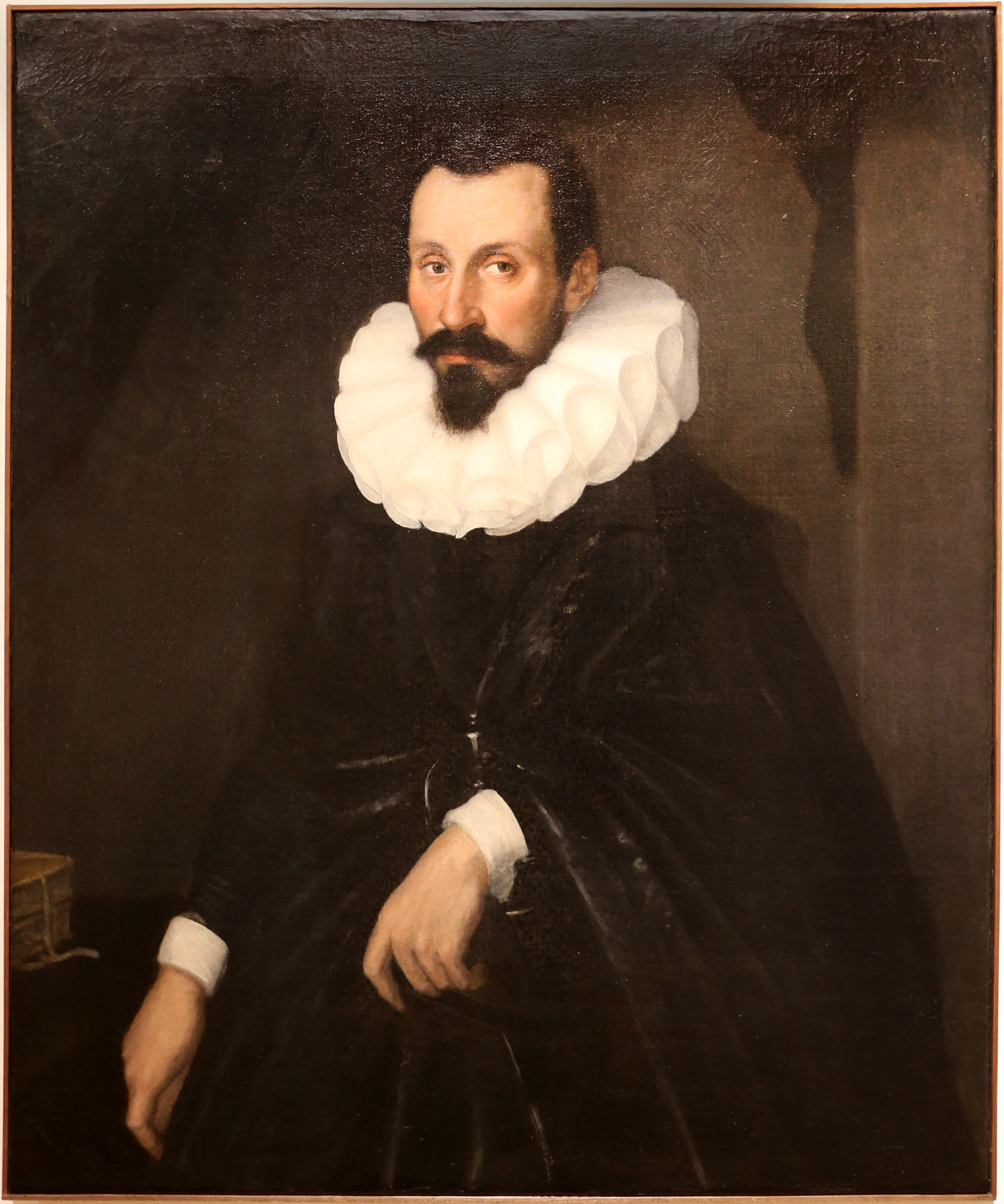
- Portrait of a Gentleman, oil on canvas, Castelvecchio Museum, Verona
- Born: 1542; Verona, Republic of Venice
- Died: 1605 (aged 62–63); Verona, Republic of Venice
- Education: Domenico Riccio
- Known for: Painting
- Movement: Mannerism

Felice Riccio (1542 – 1605) was an Italian painter of the late-Renaissance period, born and mainly active in Verona. He is also known as Il Brusasorci or Brusasorzi or Felice Brusasorci. He was the son of the painter Domenico Riccio.

== Biography ==
His painterly, soft version of Mannerism is evident in the Annunciation and Four Saints on the organ shutters of the church of the Madonna di Campagna at San Michele Extra, in the province of Verona, and also in the large Finding of Moses (1584; Verona, Castelvecchio). The Flagellation of Christ (c. 1596; San Michele Extra, Madonna di Campagna) has the same physical types and gestures but is transformed by a delicate luminism.

The late works, dating from 1598–1600 onwards, approach a Baroque style and display a more intense religious feeling. In the Giusti Altarpiece of the Virgin in Glory with Saints (1598; Verona, Sant'Anastasia), Felice used agitated gestures, although the figures’ proportions are more normal; in the Christ and the Virgin Appearing to Franciscan Saints (1600; Bolzano, Chiesa dei Cappuccini), this agitation is replaced by a more effective calm. Felice was locally celebrated for his refinement, delicacy of form and cool tones. He was the teacher of several Veronese Baroque painters, including Alessandro Turchi, Pasquale Ottini, Santo Creara, and Marcantonio Bassetti. Some of Riccio's pupils died during the Plague of 1630, including Girolamo Vernigo (dei Paesi), Bartolommeo Farfusola, Ottavo delle Comare, Girolamo Maccacaro, Paolo Zuccaro, Michelangelo Bozzoletta, and Zeno Donato.

== Gallery ==
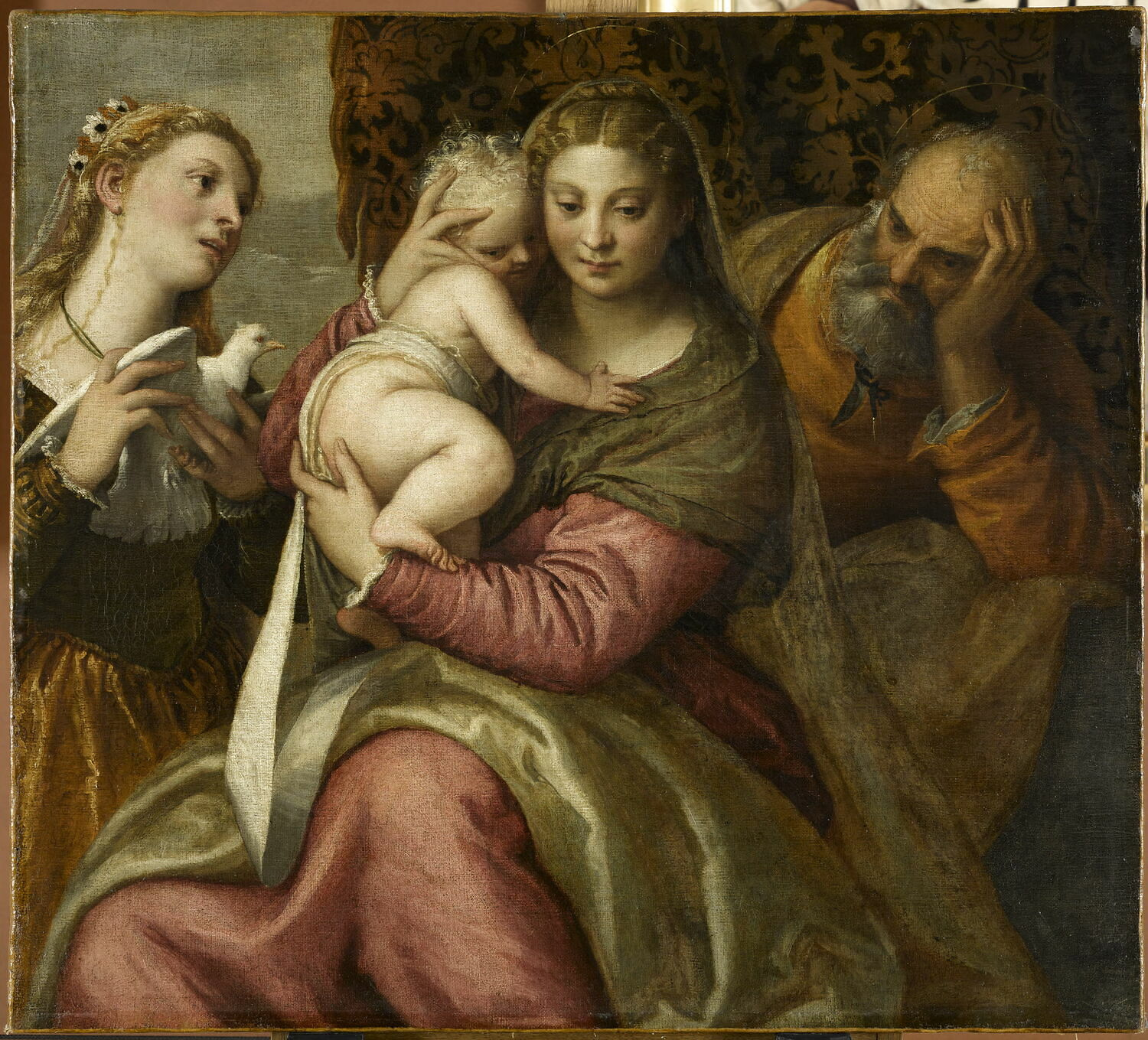
Holy Family with Saint Ursula, Louvre, Paris

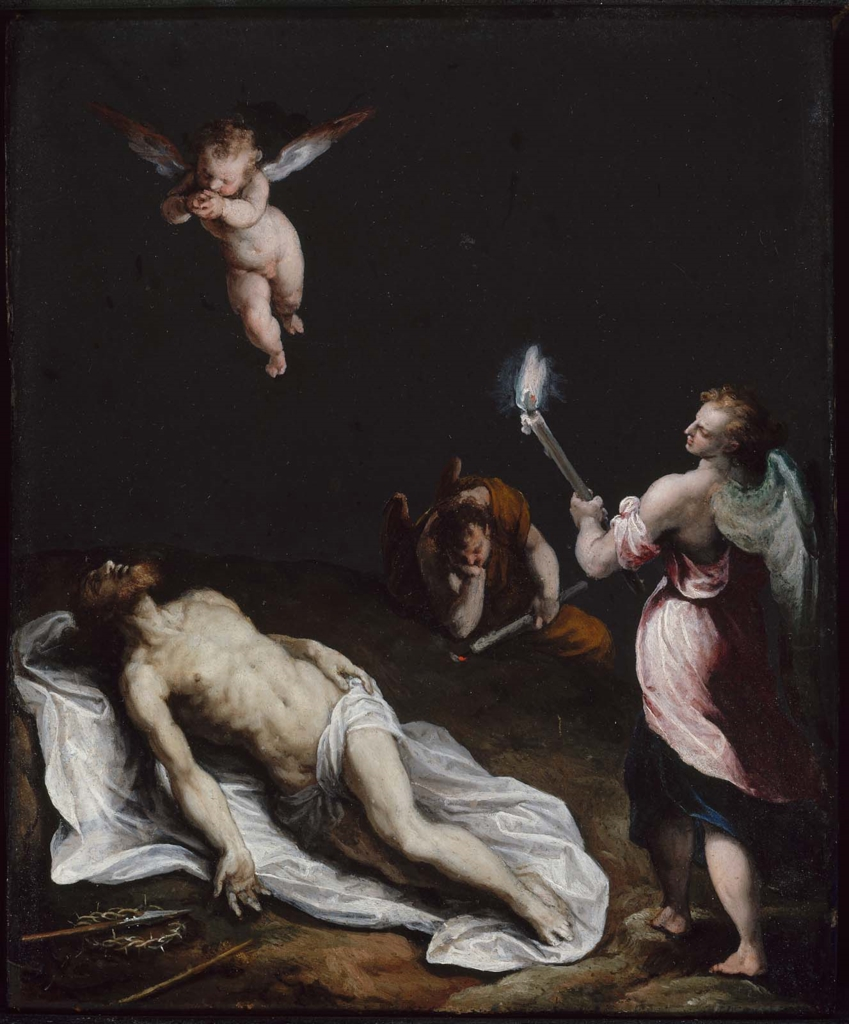
Dead Christ Mourned by Angels, Museum of Fine Arts, Boston

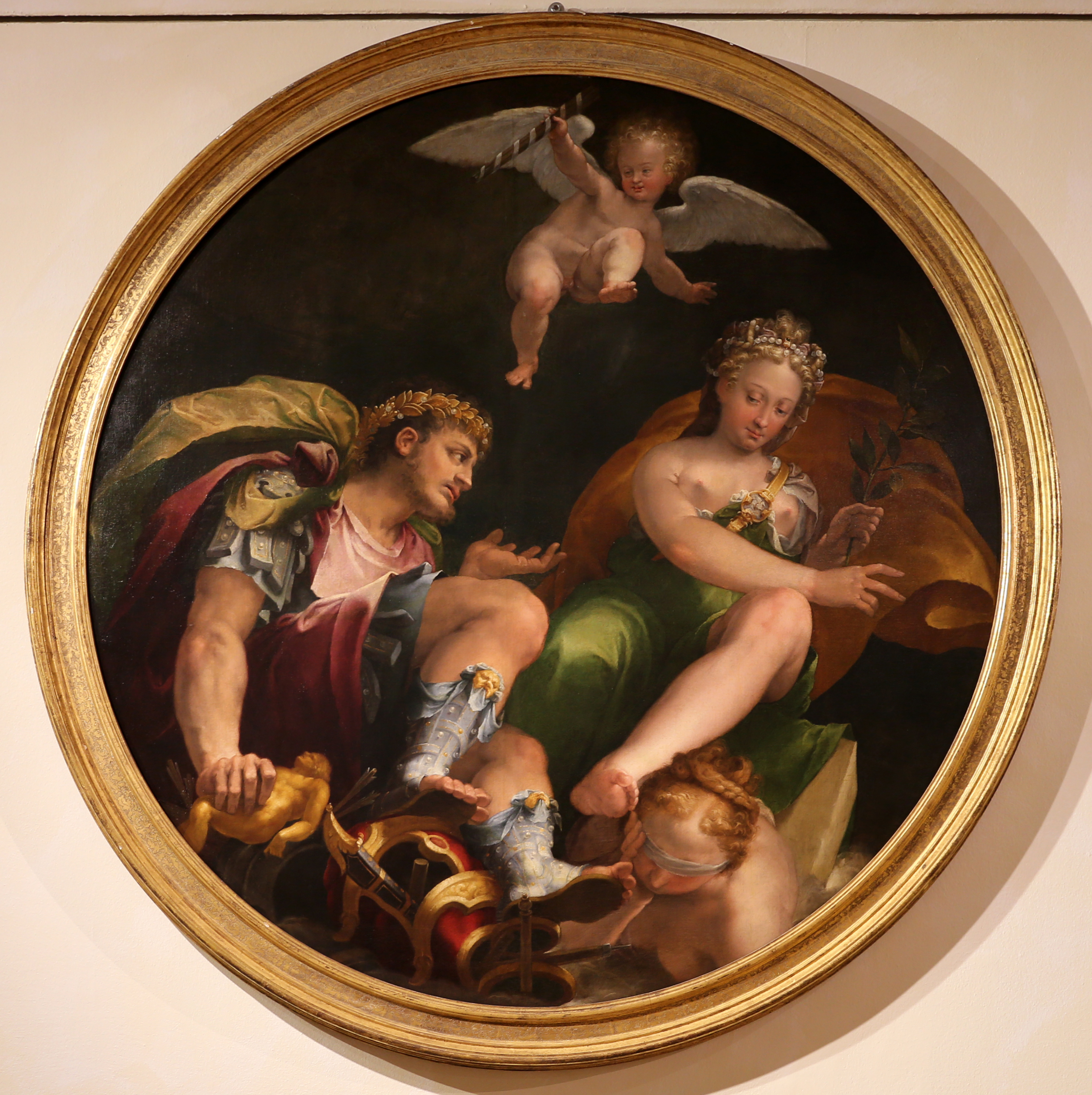
Value crowned by Fame, Castelvecchio Museum, Verona

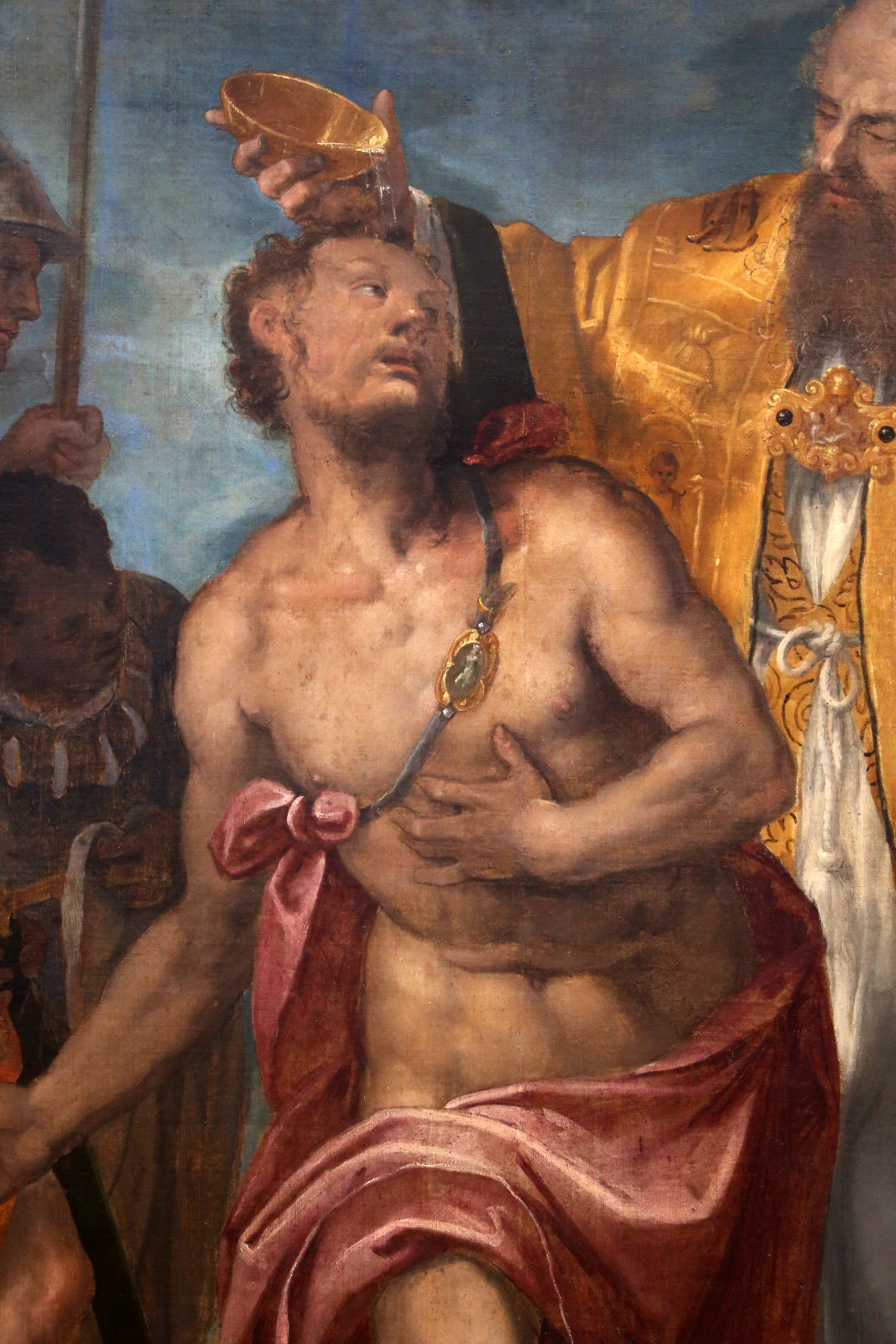
St. Sylvester baptizes the Emperor Constantine, San Francesco al Corso, Verona

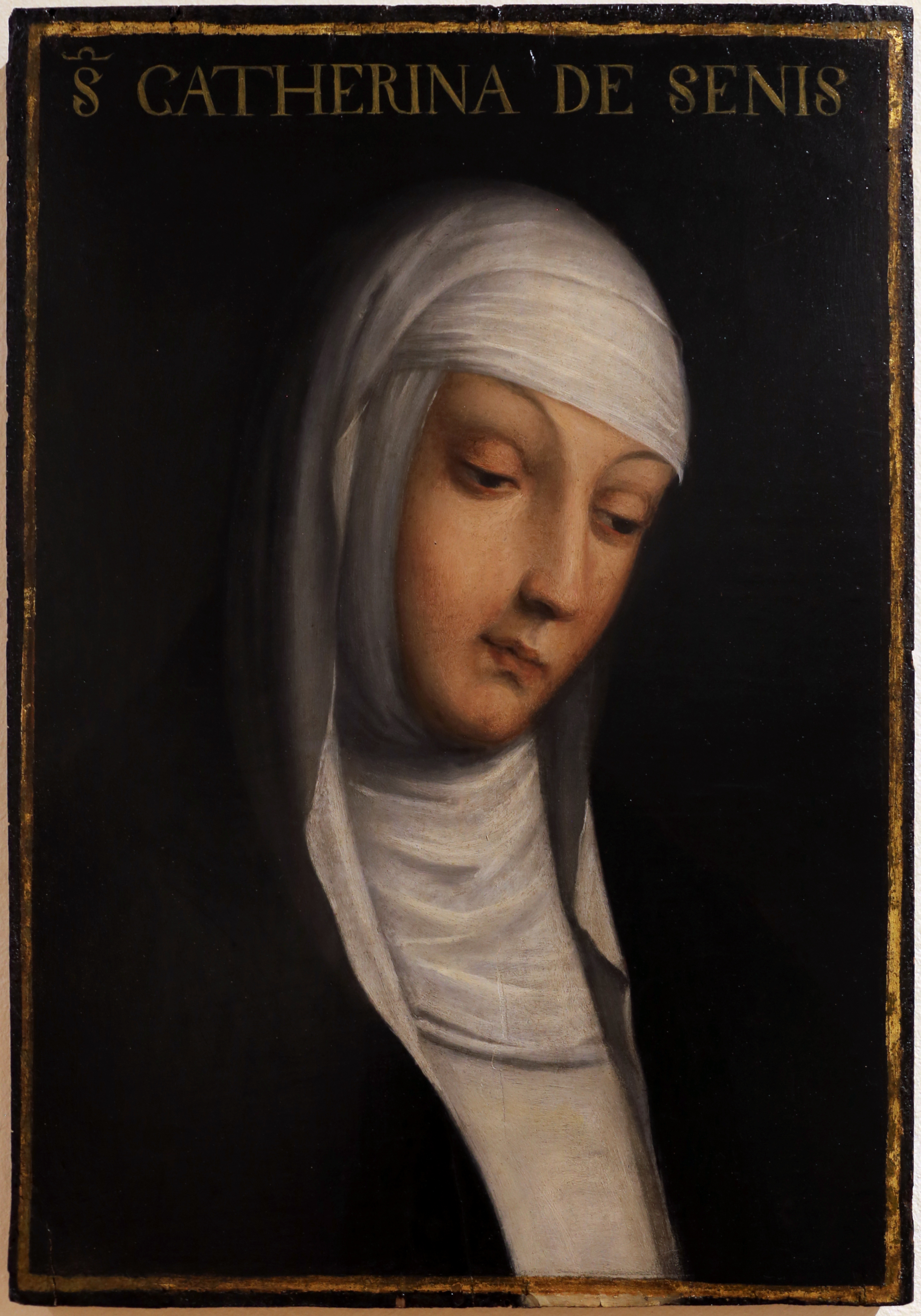
St. Catherine of Siena, Castelvecchio Museum, Verona

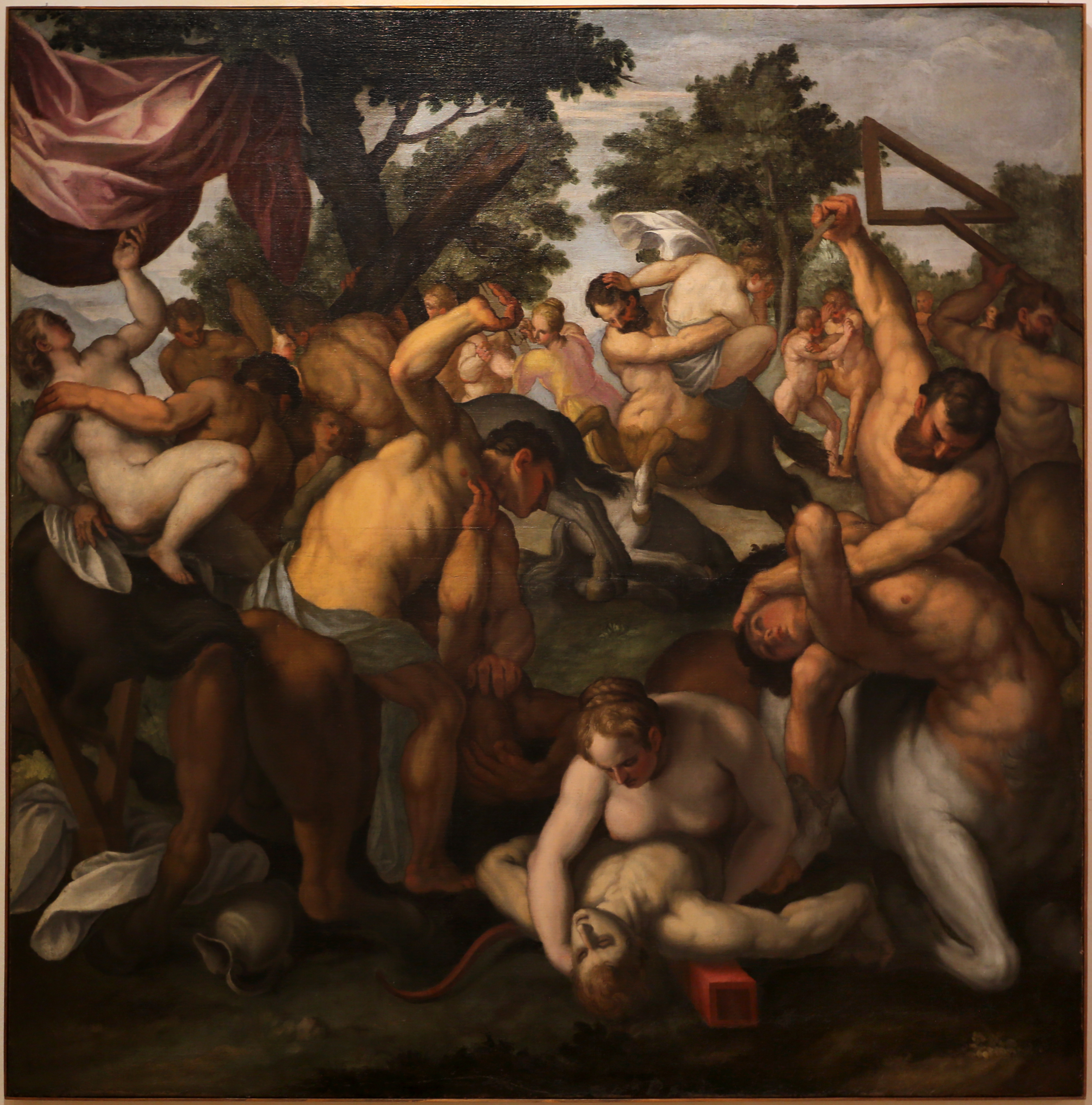
Battle of the Centaurs, Castelvecchio Museum, Verona

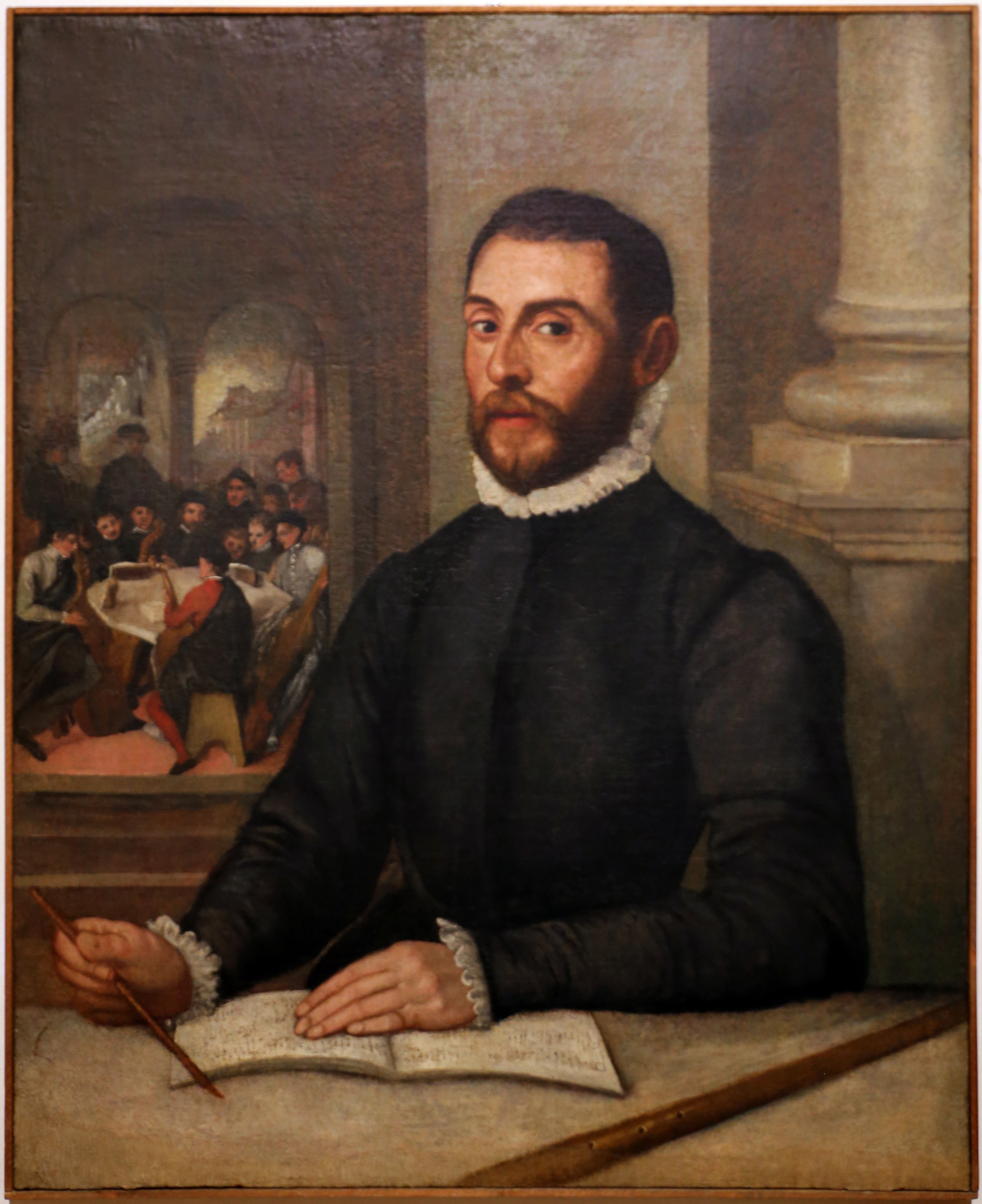
Portrait of Bartolomeo Carteri, Castelvecchio Museum, Verona

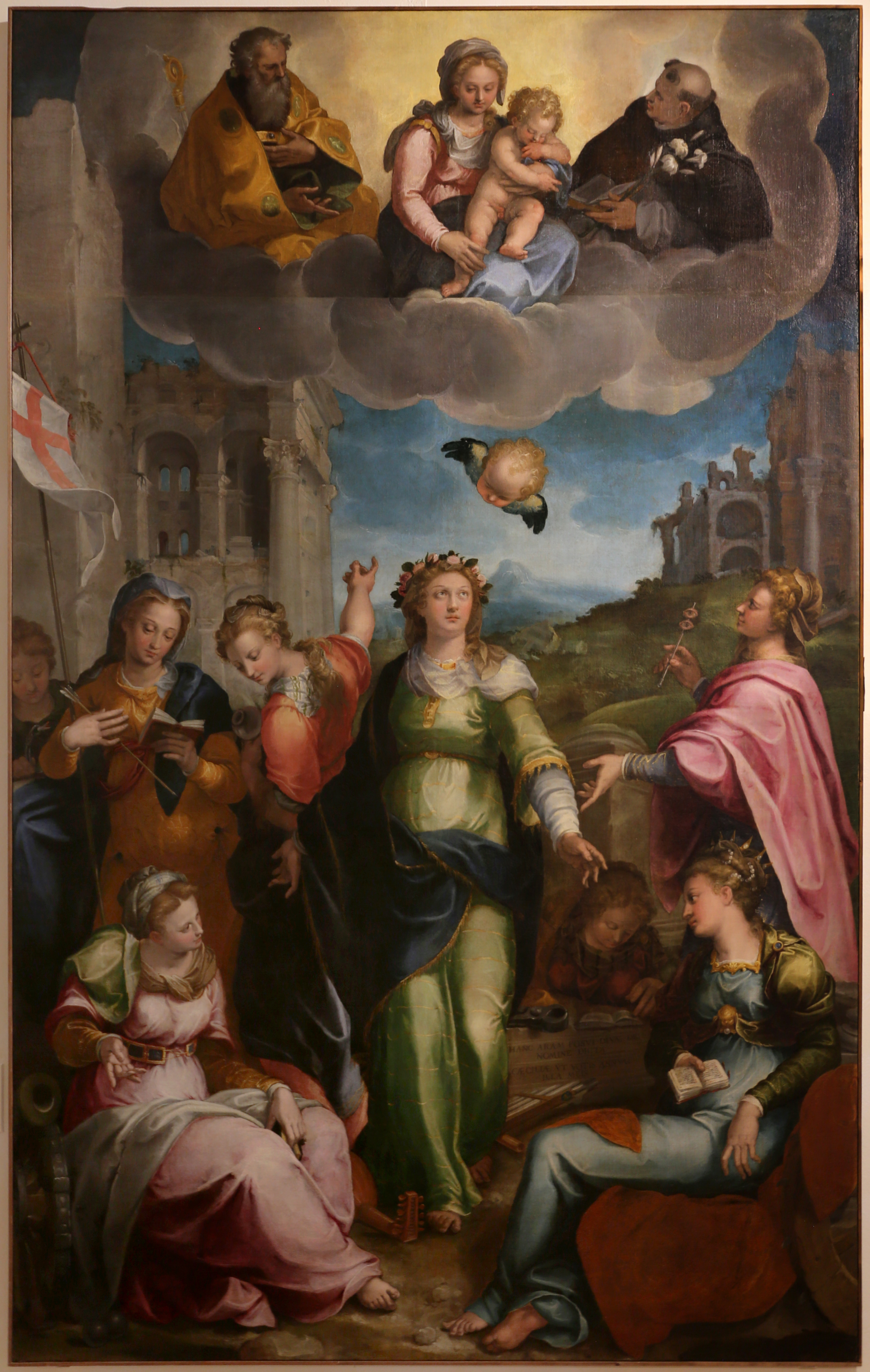
Madonna and Child between Saints Anthony, a bishop and the holy martyrs, Castelvecchio Museum, Verona

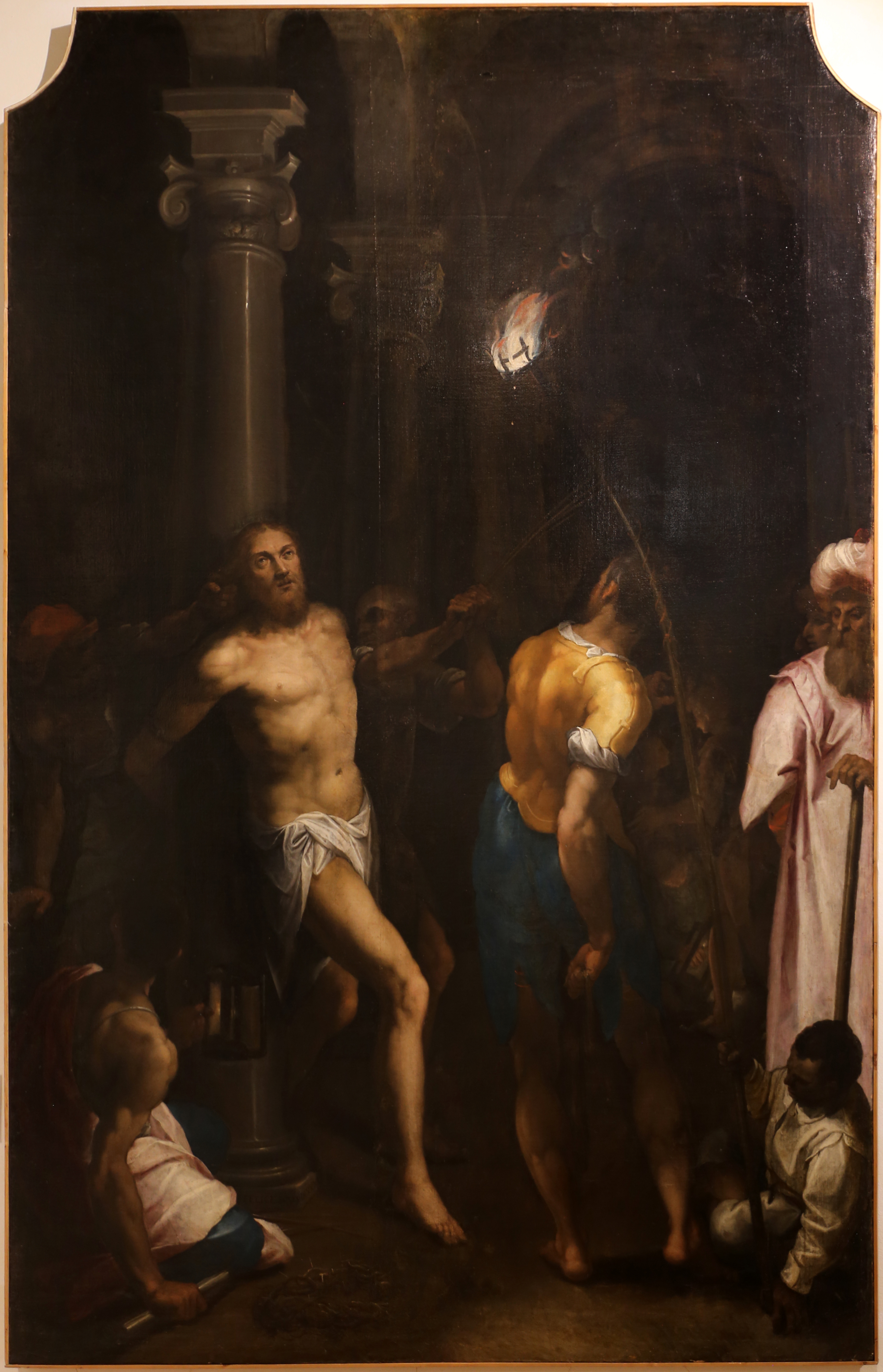
Flagellation of Christ, Castelvecchio Museum, Verona

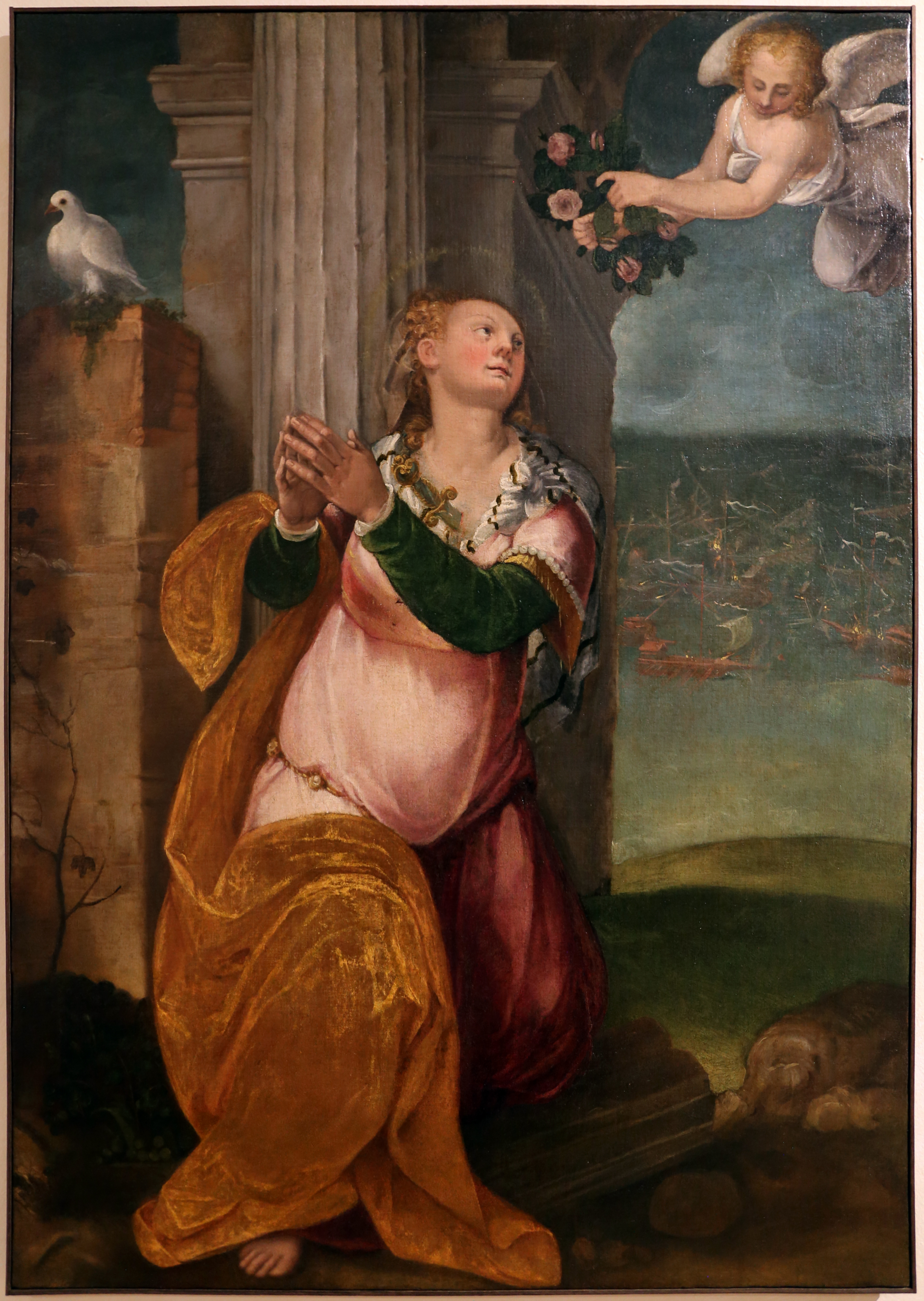
St. Justina of Padua, Castelvecchio Museum, Verona

== Bibliography ==
- Ridolfi, Carlo (1914–24). D. von Hadeln (ed.). Le Maraviglie dell'Arte. Vol. 2. pp. 123–6.
- Dal Pozzo, Bartolomeo (1718). Le vite de’ pittori, scultori e architetti veronesi. Verona: Giovanni Berno. pp. 72–5.
- Da Re, Gaetano (1910). "Notizie sui Brusasorzi". Madonna Verona. 4: 1–14.
- Arslan, Edoardo (1946). Il concetto del luminismo e la pittura veneta barocca. Milan: F.lli Bocca. pp. 14–15.
- Zava, Franca (1967). "Profilo di Felice Brusasorzi". Arte veneta. 21: 125–43.
