= Alessandro Turchi =

Italian painter (1578-1649)

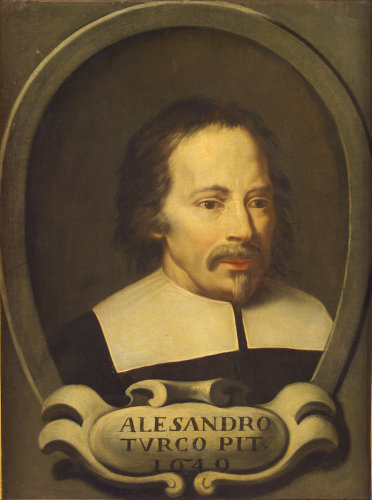
- Portrait of Alessandro Turchi
- Born: 1578; Verona, Italy
- Died: 22 January 1649 (aged 70–71); Rome, Italy
- Known for: Painting
- Movement: Baroque

Alessandro Turchi (1578 – 22 January 1649) was an Italian painter of the early Baroque, born and active mainly in Verona, and moving late in life to Rome. He also went by the name Alessandro Veronese or the nickname L'Orbetto. His style has been described as soft and Caravaggesque at the same time.

== Biography ==
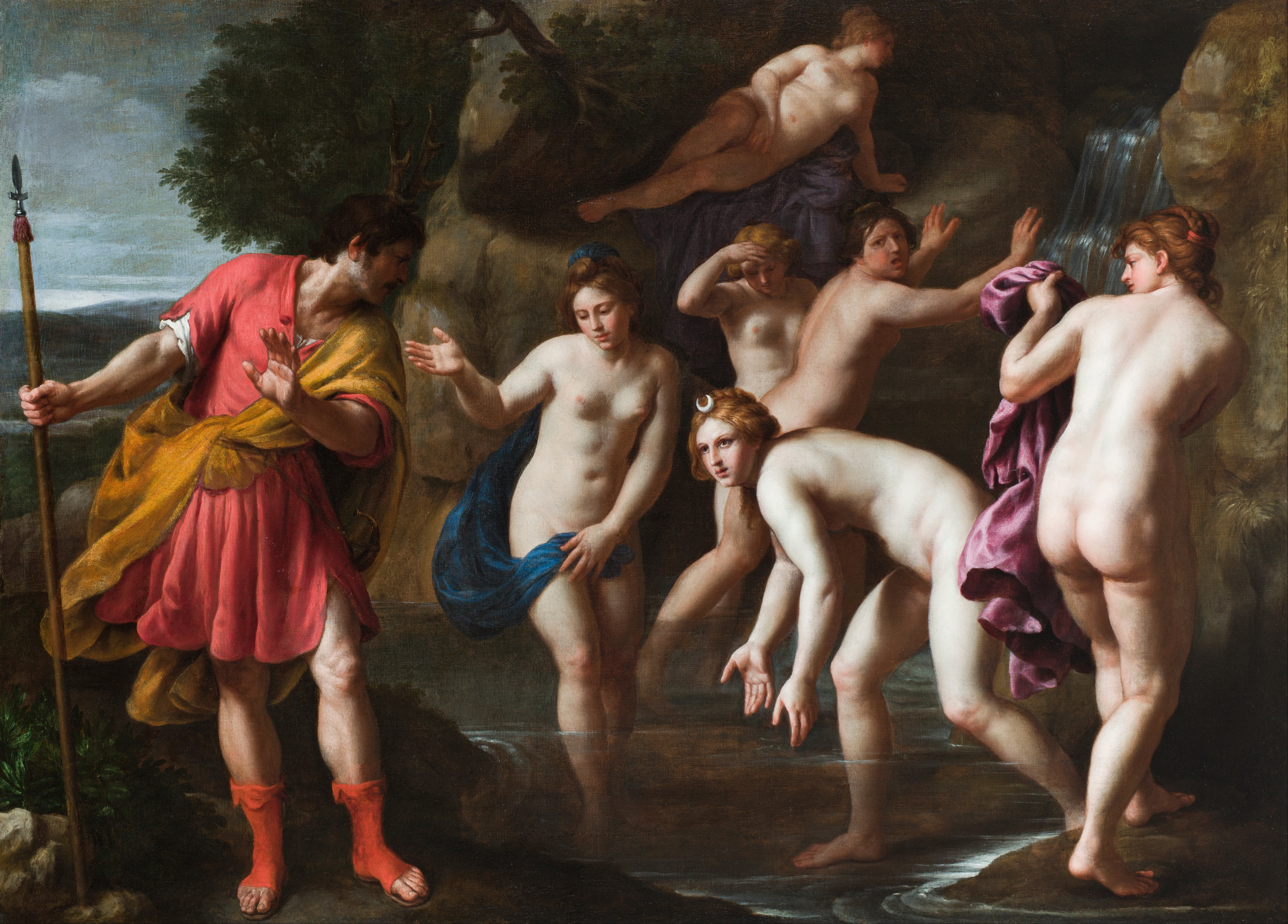
Diana and Actaeon

Turchi initially trained with Felice Riccio (il Brusasorci) in Verona. By 1603, he was working as independent painter, and in 1606–1609, Turchi painted the organ shutters for the Accademia Filarmonica of Verona. When Brusasorci died in 1605, Turchi and his fellow painter Pasquale Ottino completed a series of their deceased master's canvases. In 1610, he completed an Assumption altarpiece for the church of San Luca of Verona. In 1612, the Veronese Guild of the Goldsmiths commissioned from Turchi an altarpiece, today lost, of the Madonna and Saints. On leaving the school of Riccio, he went to Venice, where he worked for a time under Carlo Cagliari.

By 1616, Turchi traveled to Rome and participated in the fresco decoration depicting the Gathering of Manna for the Sala Reggia of the Quirinal Palace, and painting a Christ, Magdalen, and Angels for cardinal Scipione Borghese. In competition with Andrea Sacchi and Pietro da Cortona, he painted some pictures in the church of Santa Maria della Concezione dei Cappuccini. In 1619, he sent an altarpiece of the 40 martyrs for the Chapel of the Innocents in the church of Santo Stefano, Verona, to hang next to paintings by Pasquale Ottino and Marcantonio Bassetti. He also painted a Flight into Egypt for the church of San Romualdo, Rome; a Holy Family for San Lorenzo in Lucina; and a San Carlo Borromeo in San Salvatore in Lauro. He was much employed on cabinet pictures, representing historical subjects, which he frequently painted on black marble. Among his pupils, Giovanni Ceschini and Giovanni Battista Rossi (il Gobbino), practiced in Verona, the former painting copies of his master's works, which were often taken for originals.

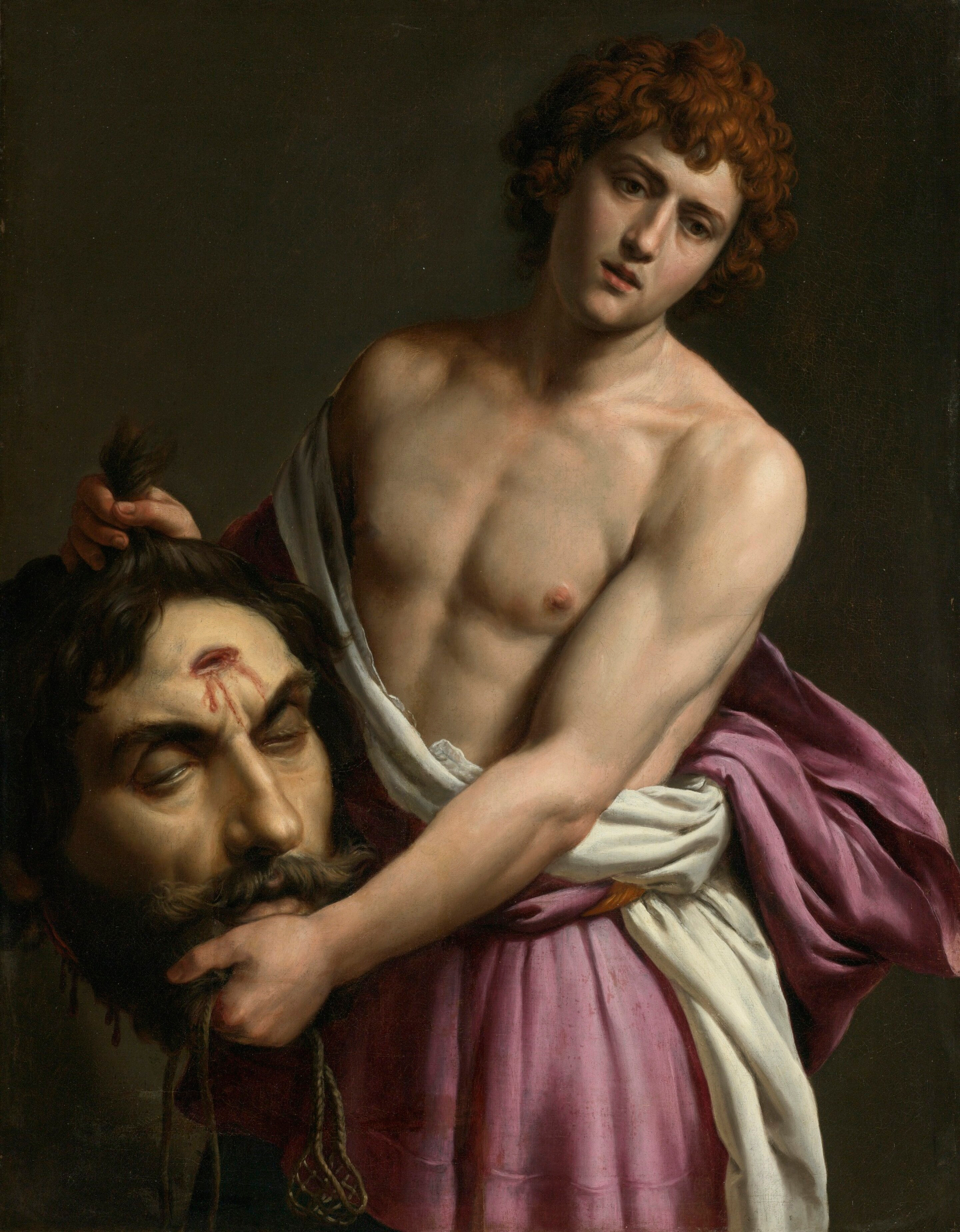
David with the Head of Goliath

For the Count Giangiacomo Giusti, in 1620 he painted an Allegory of Fame between Mercury and Pallas Athena and three canvases of Faith, Hope, and Charity. In 1621 he executed for French cardinal François de Sourdis the Resurrection of Christ, now in the cathedral of Sant'Andrea of Bordeaux, and the Adoration of the Magi for the Gherardini family in Verona. By 1621, he had completed a painting of San Carlo Borromeo and the Madonna in Glory for San Salvatore in Lauro in Rome. Documents from 1629 indicate that Turchi was paid 110 scudi for painting St. Anthony of Padua for the Farnese Palace at Caprarola. In 1632, an inventory of the Palazzo Mattei di Giove, records a Saint Marta and Maria Madalena and a Samaritan Women by Turchi.

His sister married Giacinto Gimignani. In 1623, Turchi married Lucia San Giuliano. In 1637, with the sponsorship of the cardinal Francesco Barberini, he became Principe or director of the Accademia di San Luca. In 1638, he joined the papal guild of artists, called the Pontifical Academy of Fine Arts and Letters of the Virtuosi al Pantheon. He died in Rome in 1649.

== Paintings ==
(selection)

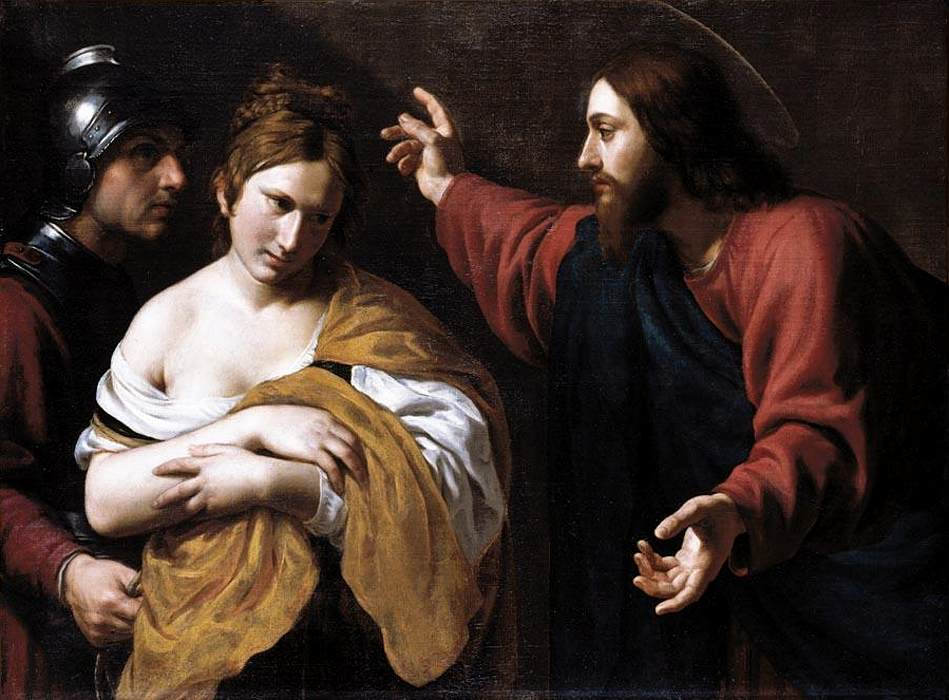
Christ and Adulterous Woman

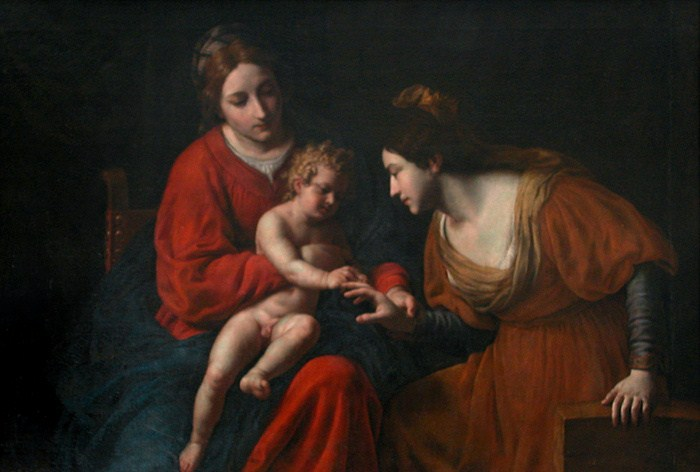
Mystical Marriage of St Catherine (Louvre)

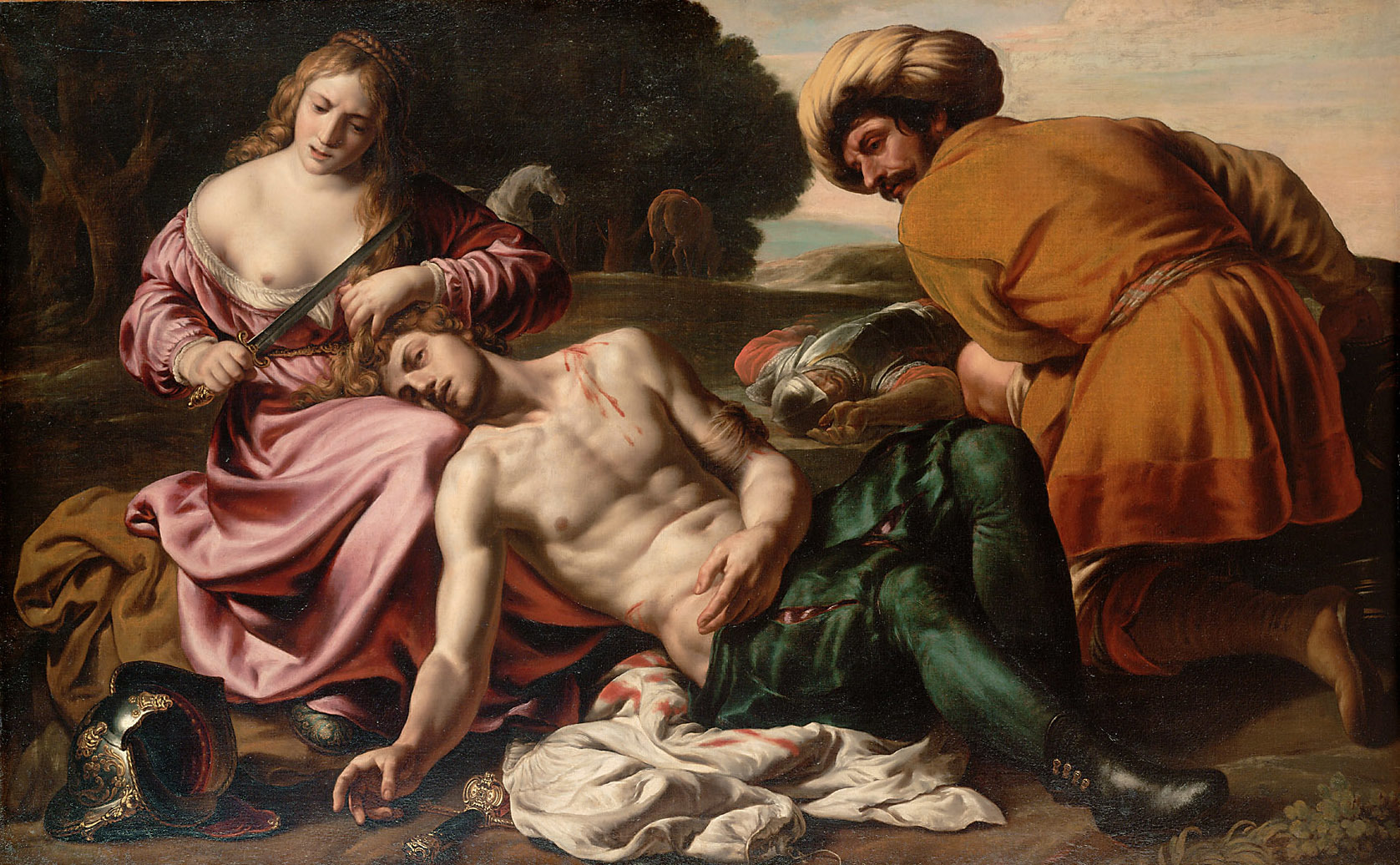
Erminia Finds the Wounded Tancred (Kunsthistorisches Museum)

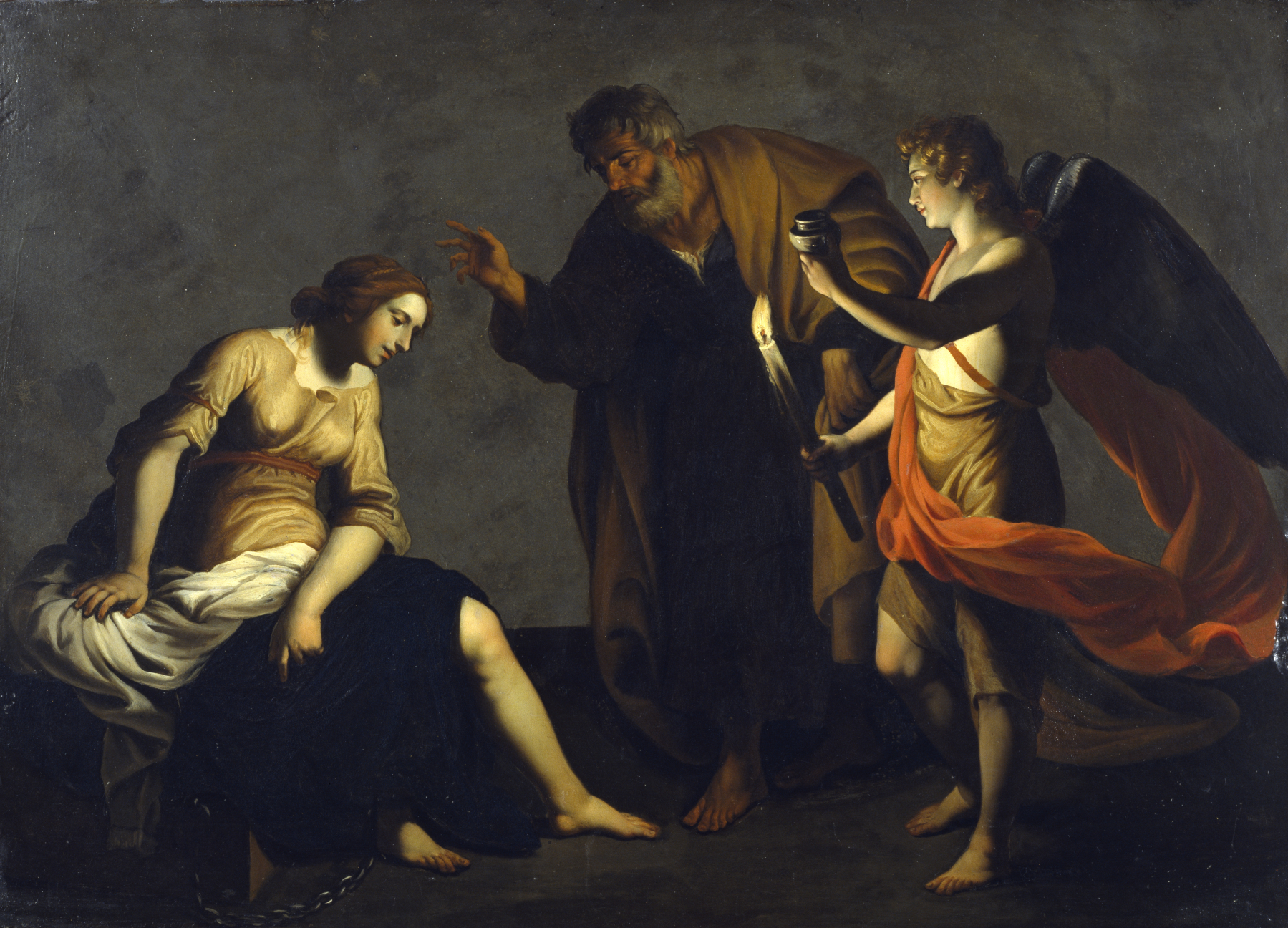
Saint Agatha Attended by Saint Peter and an Angel in Prison. The Walters Art Museum.

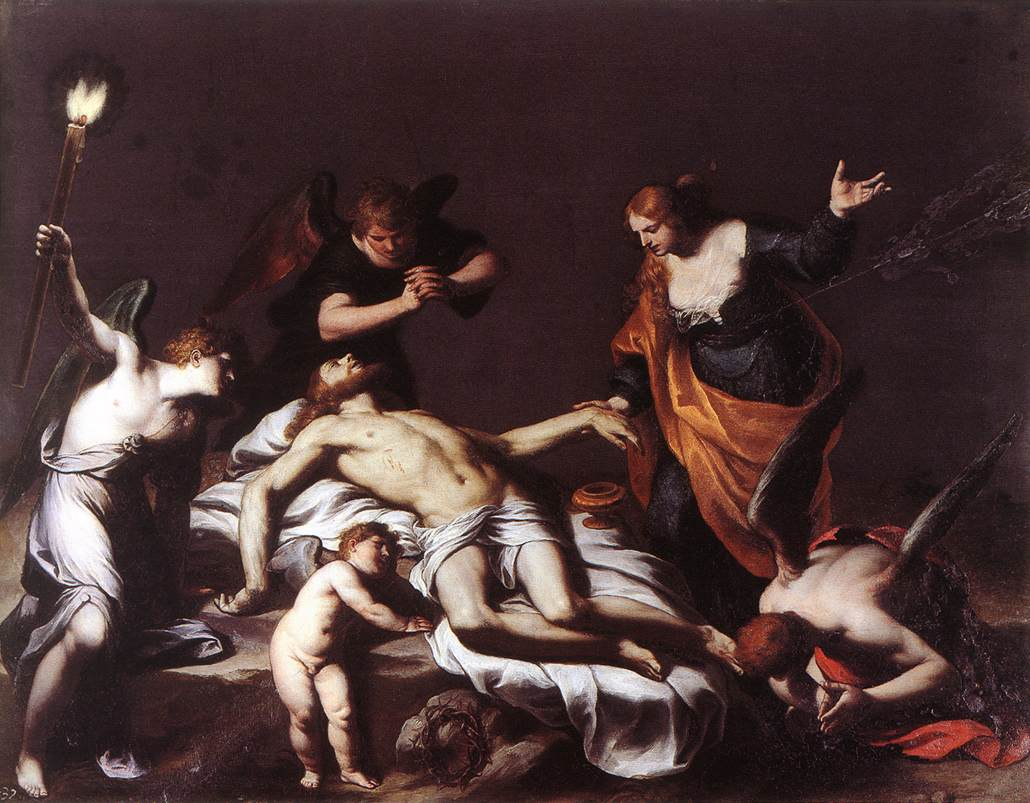
Vision of Christ of the Passion

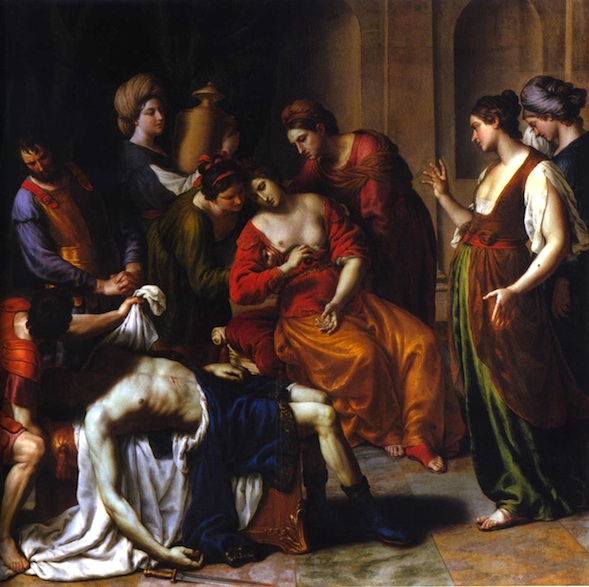
Death of Cleopatra

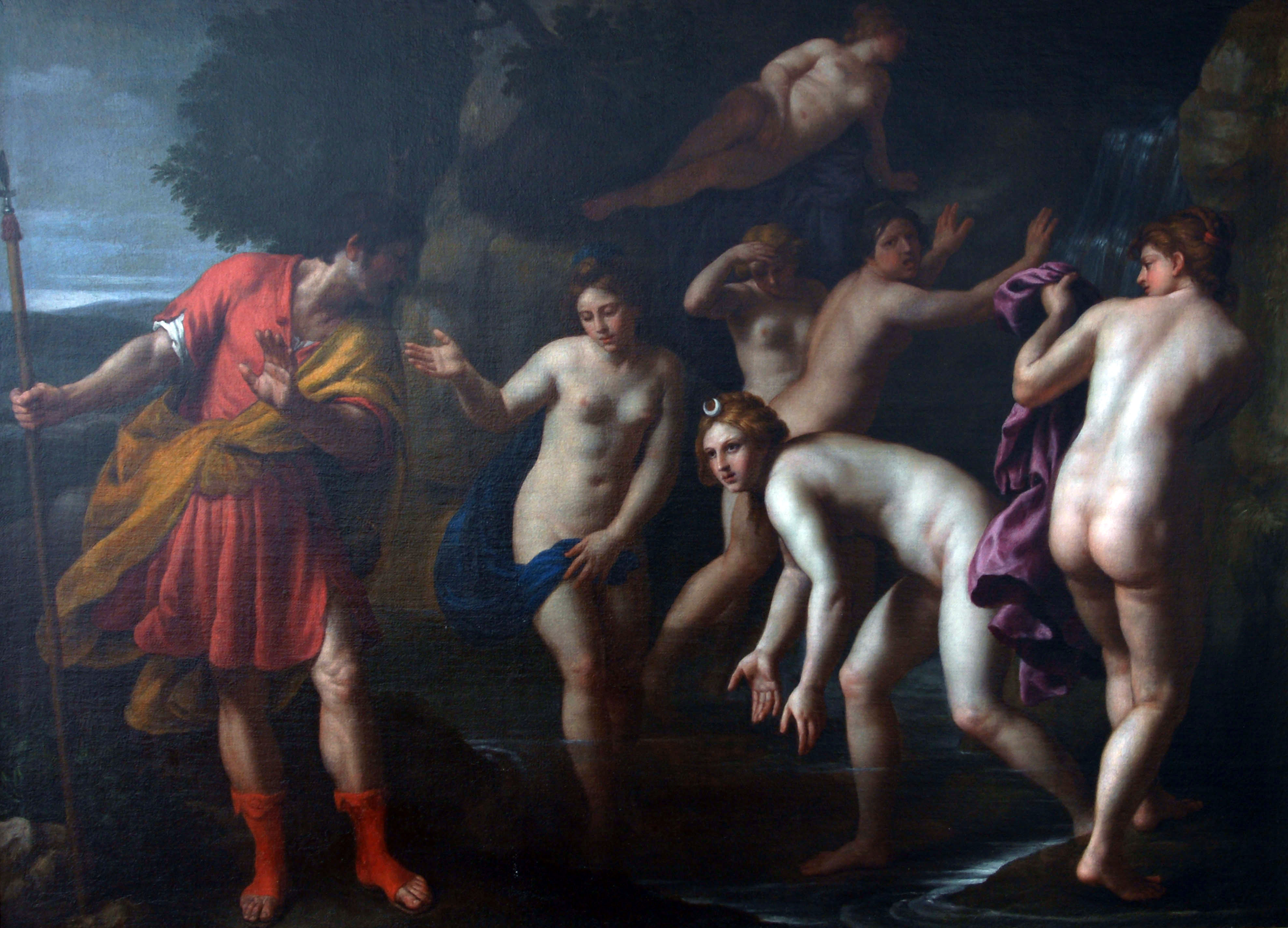
Diana and Acteon, Mougins Museum of Classical Art

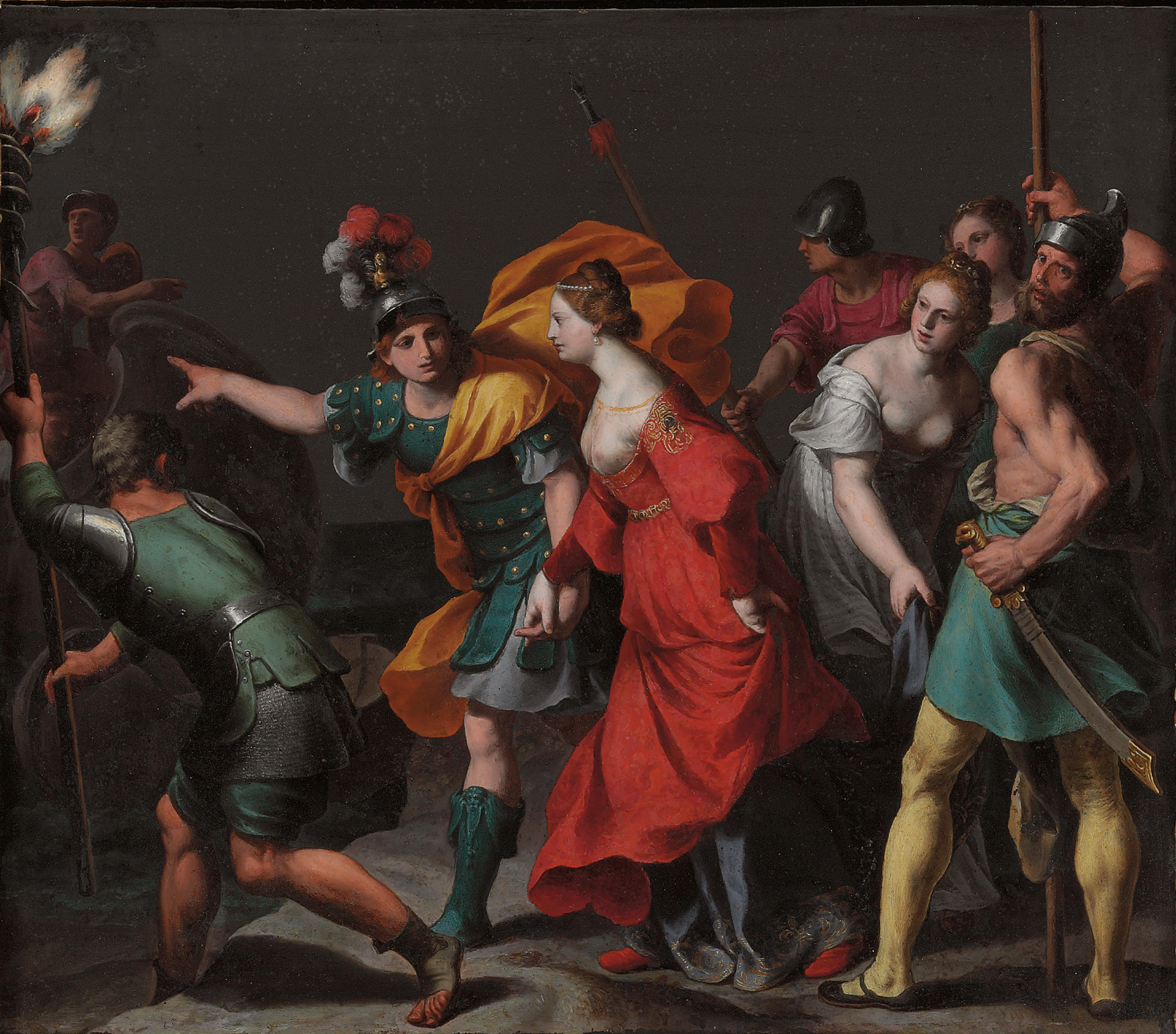
Abduction of Helen, Mougins Museum of Classical Art

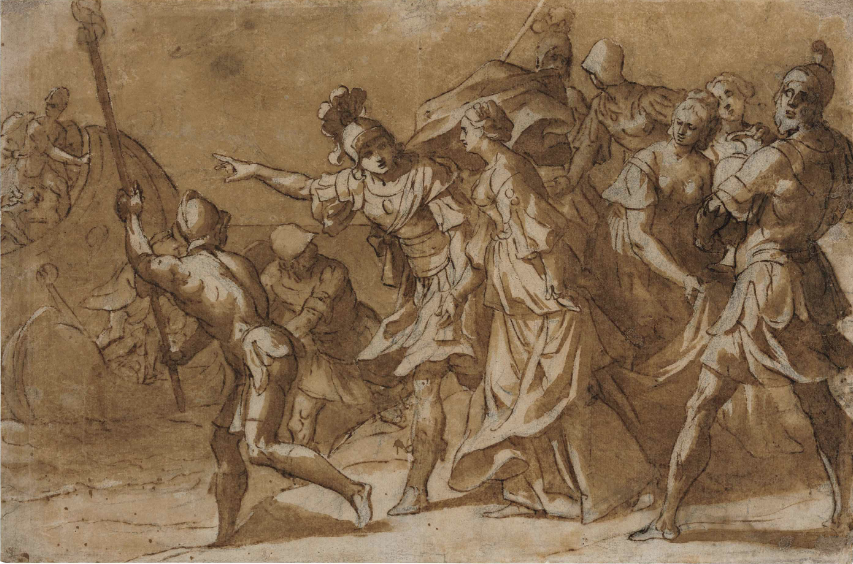
Abduction of Helen, Mougins Museum of Classical Art

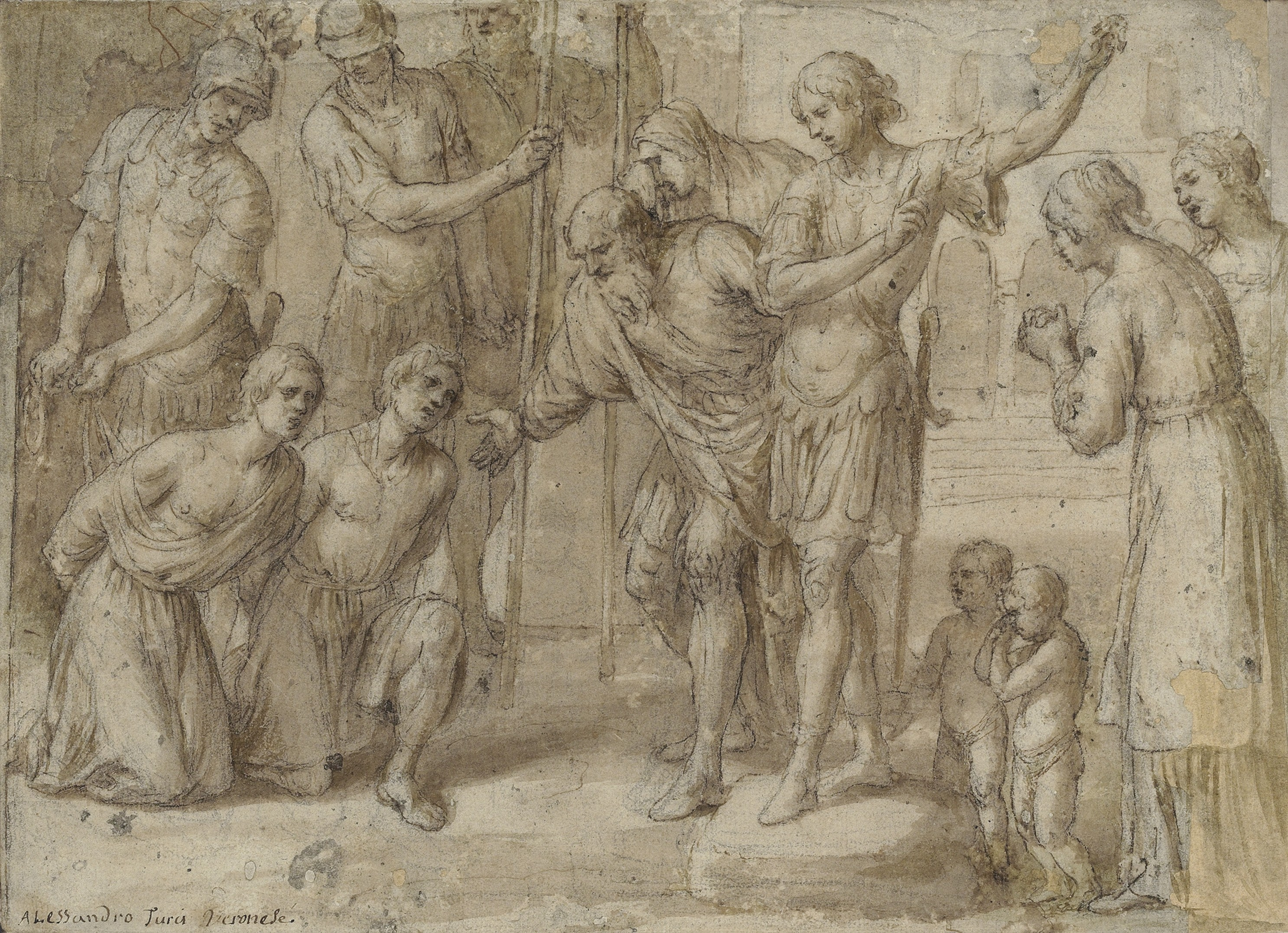
A young general (Alexander ?) showing clemency to two prisoners, Mougins Museum of Classical Art

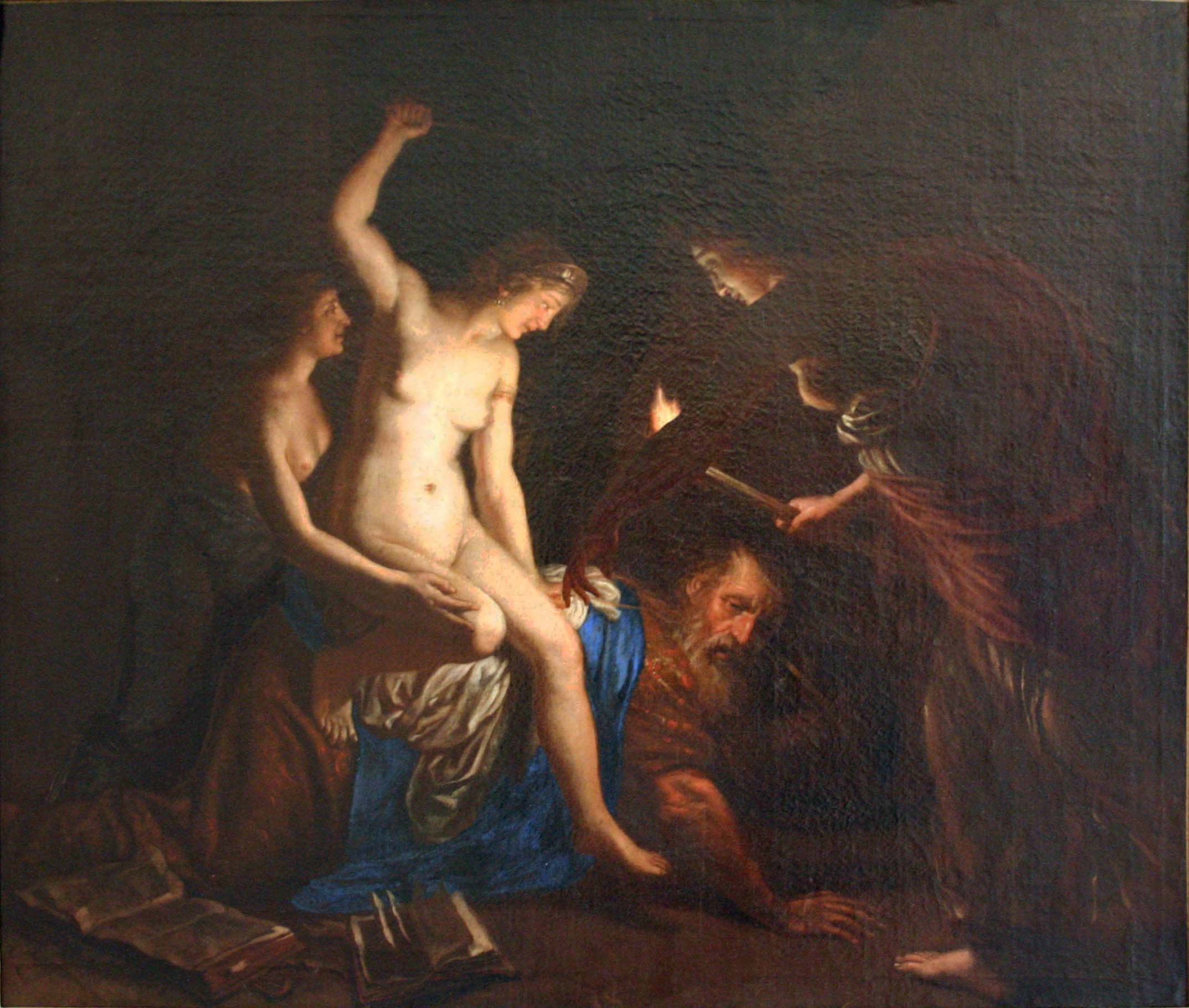
Aristotle and Phyllis Musée Fabre
