= Pasquale Ottini =

Italian painter (1578-1630)

Pasquale Ottino
- Portrait of an Olivetan Monk, c. 1610, Verona, Castelvecchio Museum
- Born: 26 September 1578; Verona, Republic of Venice
- Died: 30 July 1630 (aged 51); Verona, Republic of Venice
- Other name: Pasqualotto
- Education: Felice Brusasorci
- Occupation: Painter
- Movement: Venetian school

Pasquale Ottino or Ottini, called Pasqualotto (26 September 1578 – 30 July 1630) was an Italian Baroque painter.

== Biography ==
Ottino was a pupil, alongside Alessandro Turchi, in the studio of Felice Brusasorci. The sources indicate fairly constant activity in his hometown, even though there are still some doubts as to the reconstruction of his artistic career, especially incongruities regarding a trip to Rome that may have taken place with his companions Turchi and Marcantonio Bassetti around 1615.

Ottini's early works are decidedly Mannerist in style. After the master's death in 1605, he completed alongside Turchi the Fall of Manna for the church of San Giorgio in Braida in Verona, left unfinished on the master's death in 1605. The large canvas is an example of late Mannerism, blending Central Italian classicizing style with Venetian colorism. In 1613 he completed the Mysteries of the Rosary (Santa Maria Assunta, Engazzà, Verona), in which the bluish tones of Brusasorci are combined with sculptural forms derived from Giulio Romano and a soft, rich palette similar to that of Jacopo Bassano. Yet the simplicity (derived from an unpretentious local tradition) of the rounded faces, the summary execution of such details as hands and faces, and the sense of almost complete emotional detachment are entirely his own.

The simply structured Annunciation (c. 1620, Oppeano, Verona, parish church) is reminiscent of the work of Ludovico Carracci. The Virgin and Saints (Verona, San Giorgio in Braida) is characterized by an almost Venetian richness of colour and by sharper effects of light, suggesting an awareness of Caravaggio and his school. The monumentality and the solemnity of the Assumption of the Virgin (Santa Maria in Vanzo, Padua), painted after 1619, link it to the Virgin and Saints, but its more brilliant lighting and broader space, which betray the influence of Giovanni Lanfranco, are new. The naturalistic effects of light, the wrinkled faces and the convincing gestures recall Caravaggio, but the poses and expressions remain studied and the forms stately. Close in date are the two lateral paintings of St. Joachim and St. Joseph (1619–23; San Bernardino, Verona, chapel of the Pellegrini), strikingly naturalistic works reminiscent of Carlo Saraceni.

Ottino’s subsequent works reveal a return to his earlier classicism. In the Assumption of the Virgin (1623; Sirena, priv. col.), the influence of Bolognese and Veronese art is dominant, and Ottino’s late works, such as the Marriage of St. Catherine (Verona, Castelvecchio Museum), are yet more strongly influenced by Bolognese classicism. Ottino died of the plague in Verona on 30 July 1630, aged 51. Like his master, Ottini painted on various supports, including copper, canvas, and slate. He is also credited as an engraver, but few of his etchings survive. His sole signed print, The Burial of Christ, has been highly praised by Adam Bartsch.

== Paintings ==
The Resurrection, c. 1615, Verona, Castelvecchio Museum

- The Golden Age, c. 1610, Verona, Castelvecchio Museum;
- Mysteries of the Rosary, 1613, Santa Maria Assunta, Engazzà, Verona;
- Supper at Emmaus, c. 1610-20, Verona, Castelvecchio Museum;
- The Resurrection, c. 1615, Verona, Castelvecchio Museum;
- The Assumption of the Virgin, after 1619, Santa Maria in Vanzo, Padua;
- Annunciation, c. 1620, Oppeano, Verona, parish church;
- Madonna with St. Lawrence Justinian and a Venetian Nobleman, before 1630, Dulwich Picture Gallery;
- St. Francis and the Angel, between 1620 and 1630, Art collection of Fondazione Cariplo;
- Pietà, c. 1630, Verona, Castelvecchio Museum;
- St. Annone finds the martyred bodies of the saints Firmus and Rusticus, c. 1630, Verona, Castelvecchio Museum;
- Mary Magdalen (no date), Minneapolis Institute of Art;
- Saint Lucy, Princeton University Art Museum;
- The Massacre of the Innocents, Santo Stefano in Verona;
- Deposition, San Francesco di Paola, Verona;
- The Marriage of St. Catherine, Verona, Castelvecchio Museum.

== Gallery ==
Portrait of Cecilia Sambonifacio Giusti, c. 1608, Verona, Castelvecchio Museum

The Golden Age, c. 1610, Verona, Castelvecchio Museum

Portrait of Alessandro I Pompei, c. 1610, Verona, Castelvecchio Museum

Supper at Emmaus, c. 1610-20, Verona, Castelvecchio Museum

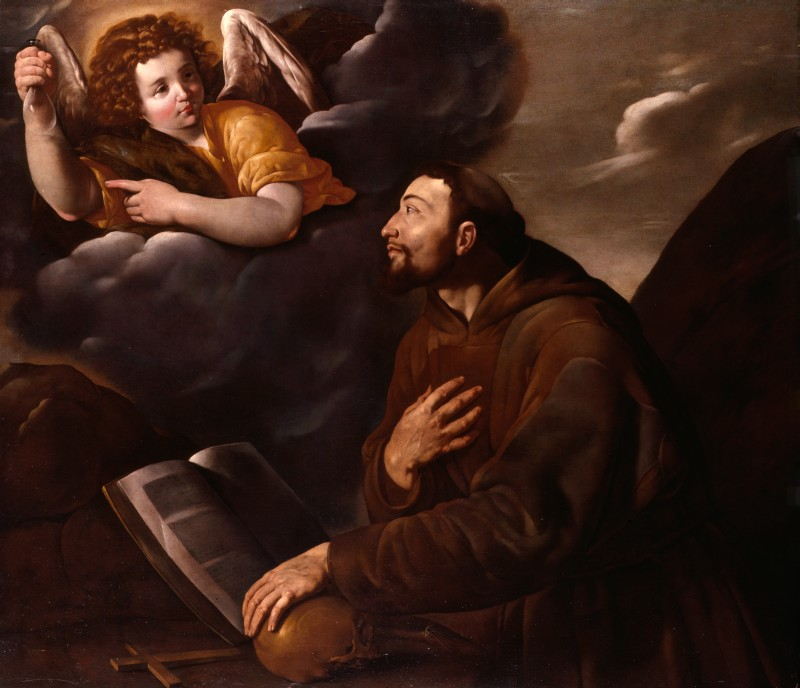
St. Francis and the Angel, between 1620 and 1630, Art collection of Fondazione Cariplo

Pietà, c. 1630, Verona, Castelvecchio Museum

St. Annone finds the martyred bodies of the saints Firmus and Rusticus, c. 1630, Verona, Castelvecchio Museum

Mary Magdalen (no date), Minneapolis Institute of Art

== Bibliography ==
- This article incorporates public domain material from McClintock, John; Strong, James (1867–1887). Cyclopædia of Biblical, Theological and Ecclesiastical Literature. Harper and Brothers.
- Dal Pozzo, Bartolomeo (1718). Le vite de' pittori, degli scultori, et architetti veronesi. Verona: Giovanni Berno. p. 167.
- Farquhar, Maria (1855). Ralph Nicholson Wornum (ed.). Biographical catalogue of the principal Italian painters. London: Woodfall & Kinder. p. 115.
- Domenico Sedini, Pasquale Ottino, online catalogue Artgate by Fondazione Cariplo, 2010, CC BY-SA (source for the first revision of this article).
- Dell'Antonio, Sara (2013). "OTTINO, Pasquale, detto Pasqualotto". Dizionario Biografico degli Italiani (in Italian). Vol. 79: Nursio–Ottolini Visconti. Rome: Institute of the Italian Encyclopaedia. ISBN 978-88-12-00032-6.

== Other projects ==
- "Ottino, Pasquale". Enciclopedia on line. Rome: Istituto dell'Enciclopedia Italiana.
