= Dalla Torre =

Dalla Torre may refer to:

== Place ==
- Palazzo Dalla Torre, patrician palace in Verona, northern Italy

== People ==
=== Middle name ===
- Giacomo dalla Torre del Tempio di Sanguinetto (1944–2020), Prince and Grand Master of the Sovereign Military Order of Malta

=== Surname ===
- Emanuele Dalla Torre (born 1980), Italian-Israeli physicist
- Ferruccio Dalla Torre (1931–1987), Italian bobsledder
- Giovanni Battista dalla Torre (1585–1641), Italian painter
- Karl Wilhelm von Dalla Torre (1850–1928), Austrian taxonomist and botanist
- Mattia Dalla Torre (born 1996), Italian figure skater
