= Anselmo Canera =

Italian painter

- Born: Verona
- Known for: Palladian frescoes
- Notable work: Insult to the Pharaoh

Anselmo Canera, or Canneri (active 1522–1584), was an Italian painter of the late Renaissance, born and mainly active in Verona. He is noted for his frescoes and his collaborations with other Italian artists such as Bernardino India and Paolo Veronese.

== Biography ==
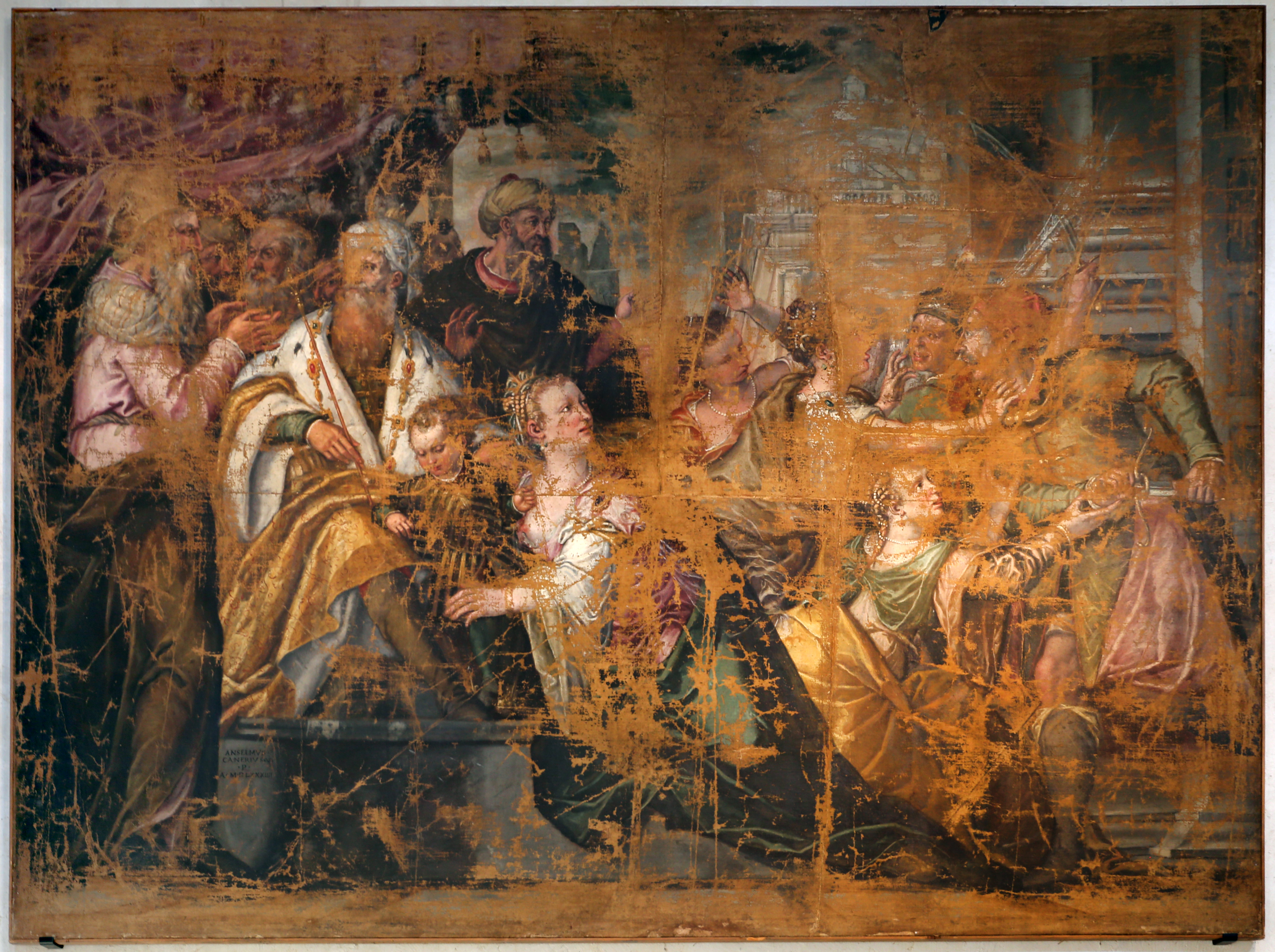
Insult to the Pharaoh (1584)

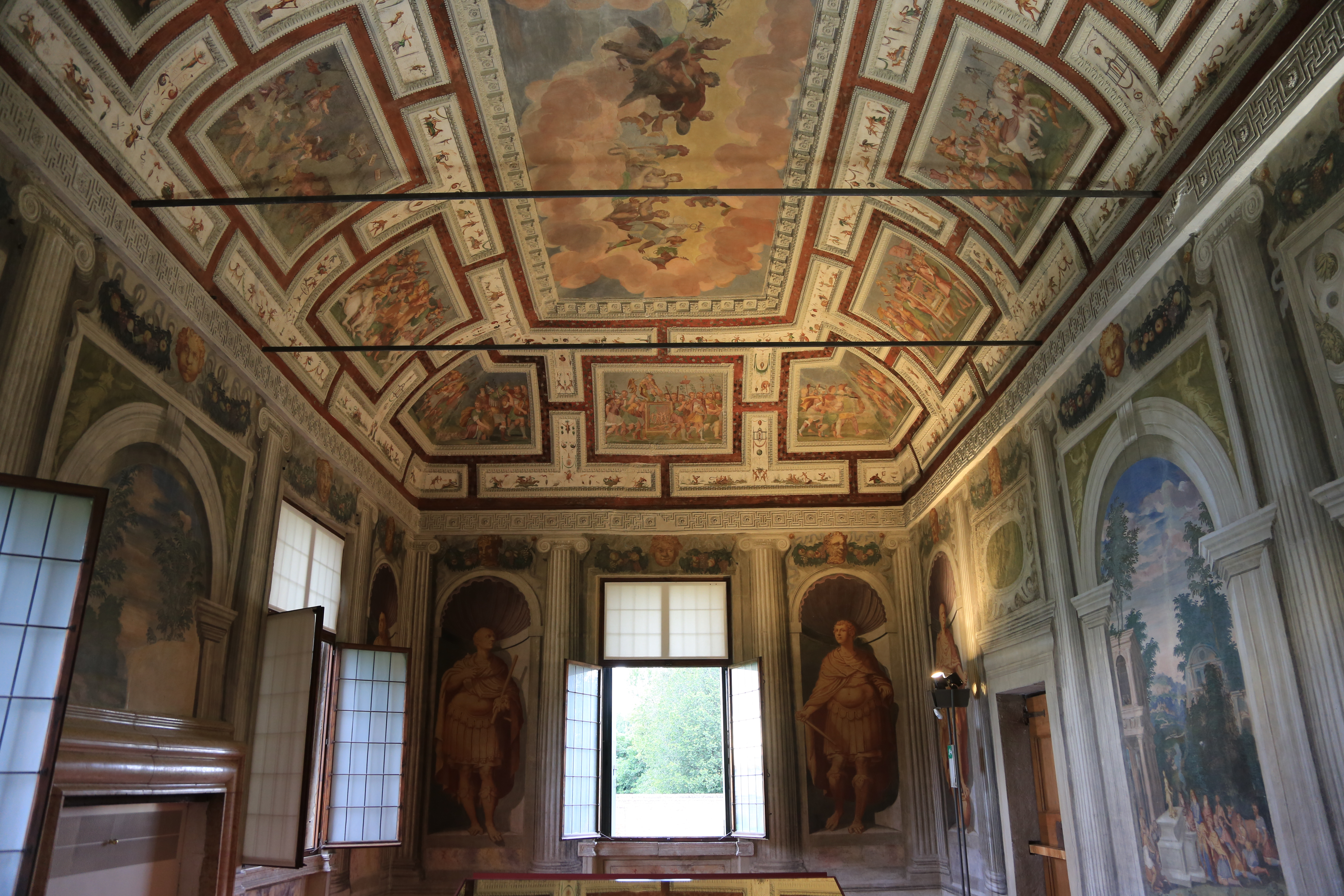
Canera's frescoes at Villa Pojana's Hall of Emperors.

Little is known of Canera's biography. He is said to have trained with Giovanni Francesco Caroto. He painted frescos in some of the Palladian buildings in and around Verona, including Palazzo Thiene and those of Villa Pojana in Pojana Maggiore. During 1550-1560, he collaborated in such fresco work with Bernardino India. They were considered two of the top painters during their time. This collaboration included their work for Villa Pojana, an estate in Vicentino. Canera is noted in this project for his well-preserved frescoes on walls and cove vaults dedicated to the Roman emperors.

Canera also worked with the young Paolo Veronese at the Villa Soranzo near Treviso in 1552, and subsequently is recorded painting at Castelfranco, Vicenza, and Verona. Their work at Castelfranco for the Soranzo family involved a cycle of frescoes on the villa's walls. This work only survived in fragments. In 1584, his canvas of the Insult to the Pharaoh formed part of a trio of canvases, the others by Felice Brusasorzi and Paolo Farinati depicting scenes from the life of Moses in the Palazzo Ridolfi.

== Sources ==
- Bryan, Michael (1886). Robert Edmund Graves (ed.). Dictionary of Painters and Engravers, Biographical and Critical. Vol. I: A-K. London: George Bell and Sons. p. 225.
- Penny, Nicholas, National Gallery Catalogues (new series): The Sixteenth Century Italian Paintings, Volume II, Venice 1540-1600, 2008, National Gallery Publications Ltd, ISBN 1857099133
