= Bernardino India =

Italian painter

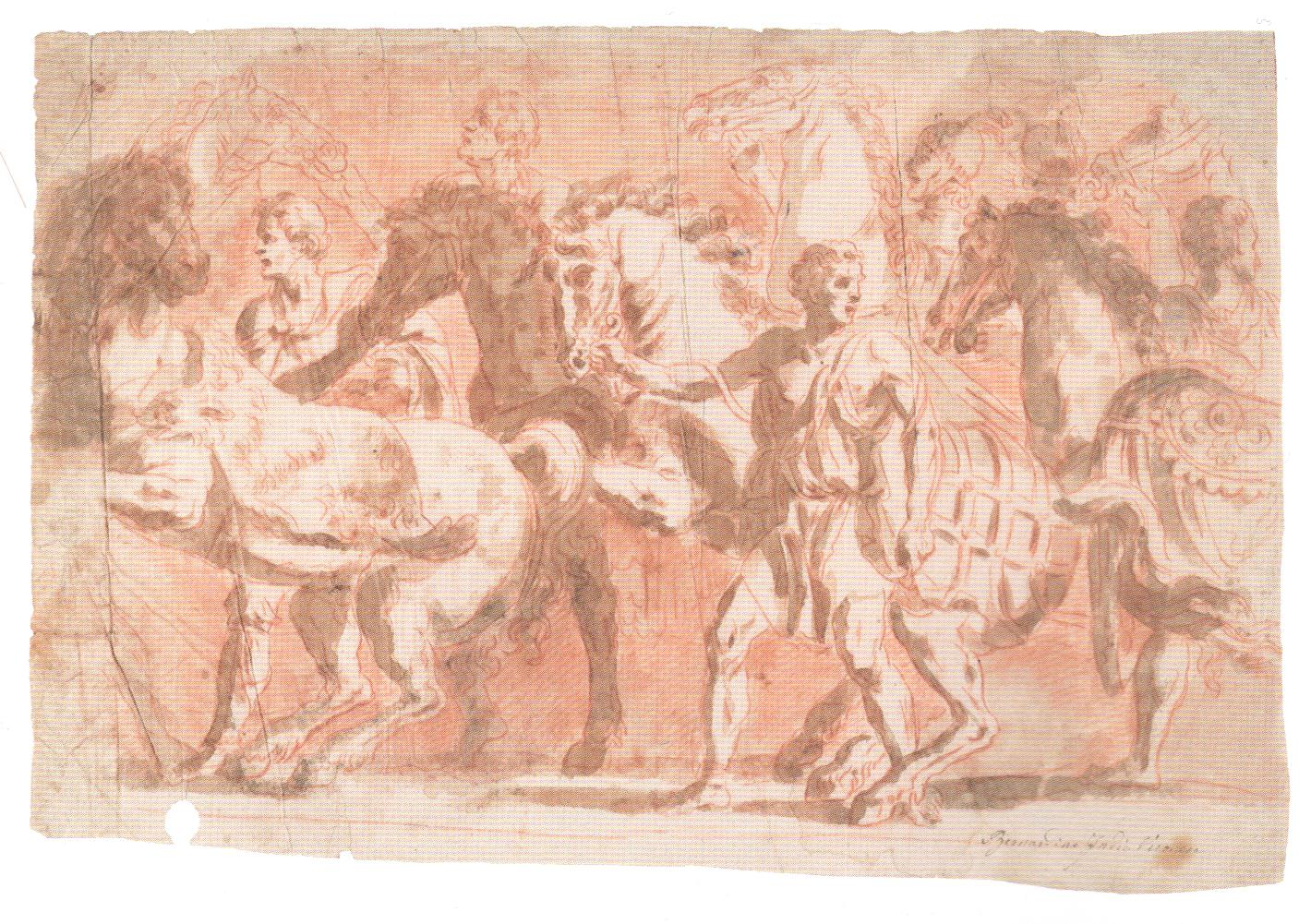
Bernardino India - Cavalry parade I, sanguine

Bernardino India (1528–1590) was an Italian painter of the late Renaissance, born and mainly active in Verona.

== Life ==
Born in Verona in 1528, his widowed mother married again in 1545 and Bernardino was then entrusted to his maternal grandparents, Caterina and Bernardino India, and came to take their surname. He is said to have trained with Domenico Riccio.

Between 1550 and 1555, he worked with Eliodoro Forbicini on two rooms on the ground floor of the Palazzo Canossa in Verona, decorating them with Olympic divinities and grotesques, an extravagant style of ancient Roman decorative art rediscovered at Rome at the end of the fifteenth century and subsequently imitated. In 1552, India moved to Vicenza to decorate the palace that Marcantonio Thiene had just had built by Andrea Palladio.

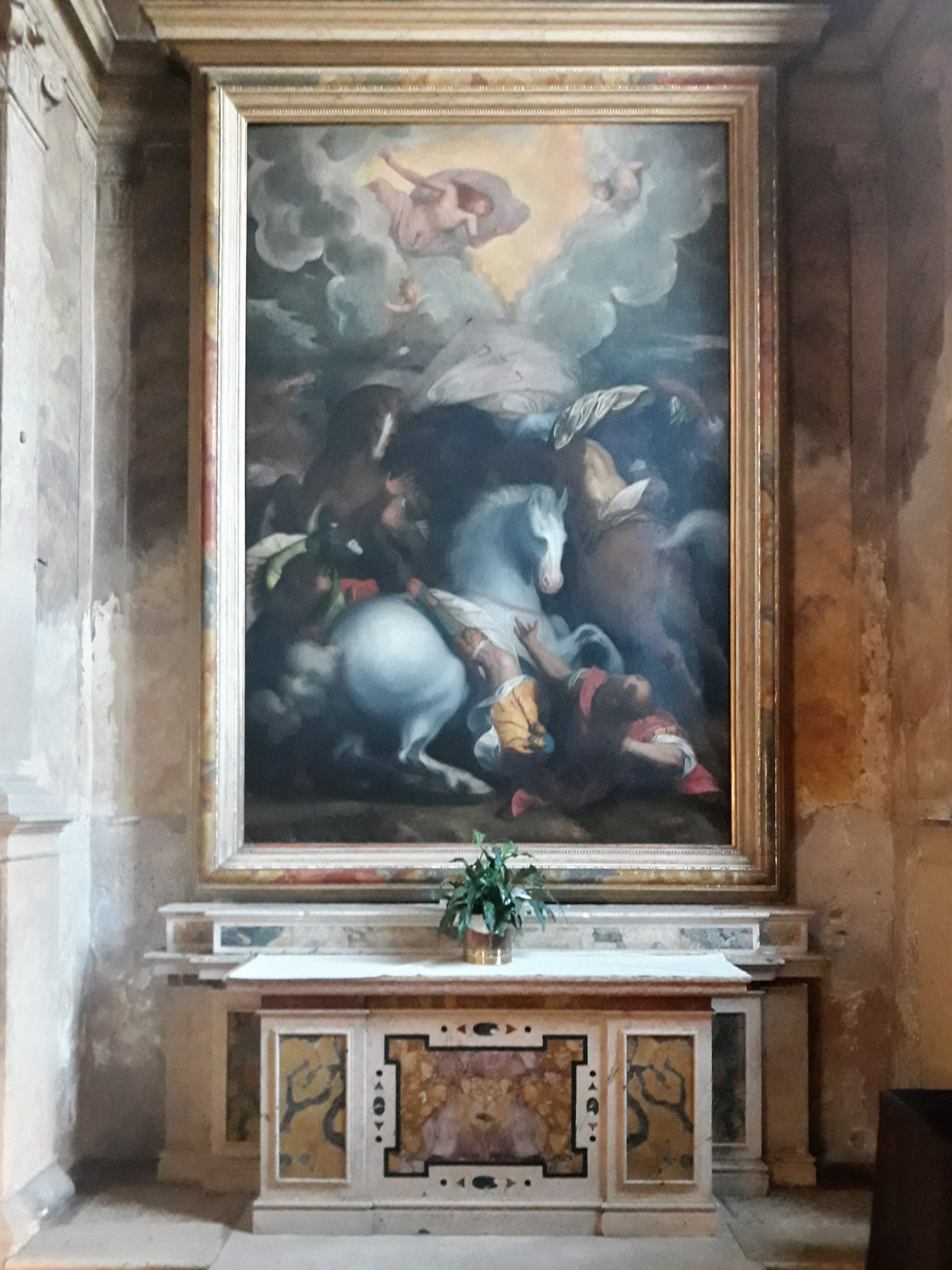
Conversione San Paolo, 1584

In 1555, he married Anna degli Stivieri. That same year he collaborated with Felice Brusasorci, Domenico's son, in a cycle of frescoes painted in 1555 on the southern facade of the Palazzo Fiorio della Seta, commissioned by the Veronese merchant Fiorio dei Flori. Intended to celebrate the cities of the Mainland where the silk industry flourished, they are now preserved at the Civic Museums of Verona.

He decorated Palladian villas such as Villa Pojana, Villa Foscari (also known as La Malcontenta) where Giovanni Battista Zelotti also worked. He worked on the small octagonal ceiling of the Palazzo Dalla Torre in Verona.

Sometime between 1560 and 1570, India painted a fresco depicting Coriolanus receiving the Roman matrons for the Palazzo Da Lisca near Santa Maria in Organo. He created altarpieces, some of were executed by India with Orlando Flacco, including a lost altarpiece for S. Zeno from 1563, the preparatory drawing of which is preserved in the National Gallery of Art in Washington. In 1566 the Verona City Council commissioned them to paint a canvas for the Council loggia. Also from 1566 was an altarpiece, lost, for S. Luca in Verona, now known only from photographs.

Around 1570, India decorated the organ of S. George in Braida with Biblical characters. In 1572, he provided a Nativity for the altar of the Franco counts in the church of San Bernardino of Verona. In 1576, he did a Virgin enthroned the saints Giovanni Battista and Rocco for the parish church of St. Andrew in Sommacampagna.

He collaborated on Michele Sanmicheli's Pellegrini chapel in San Bernardino. The 1579 altarpiece, by India, depicts the Madonna with Child and St. Anne. In 1584, he completed a Conversion of Saint Paul for Santi Nazaro e Celso.

India died in Verona in 1590.

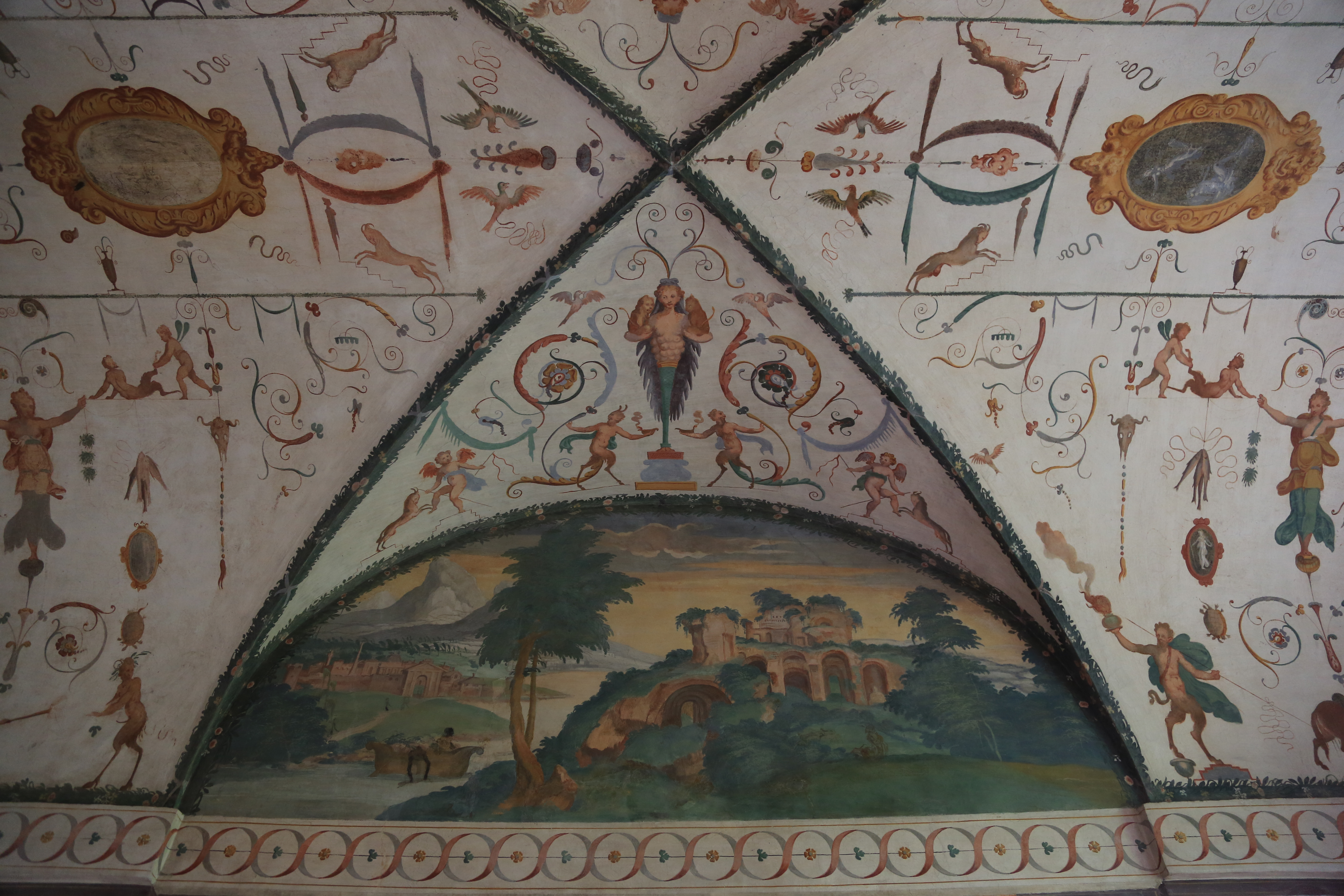
Villa Pojana grotesque

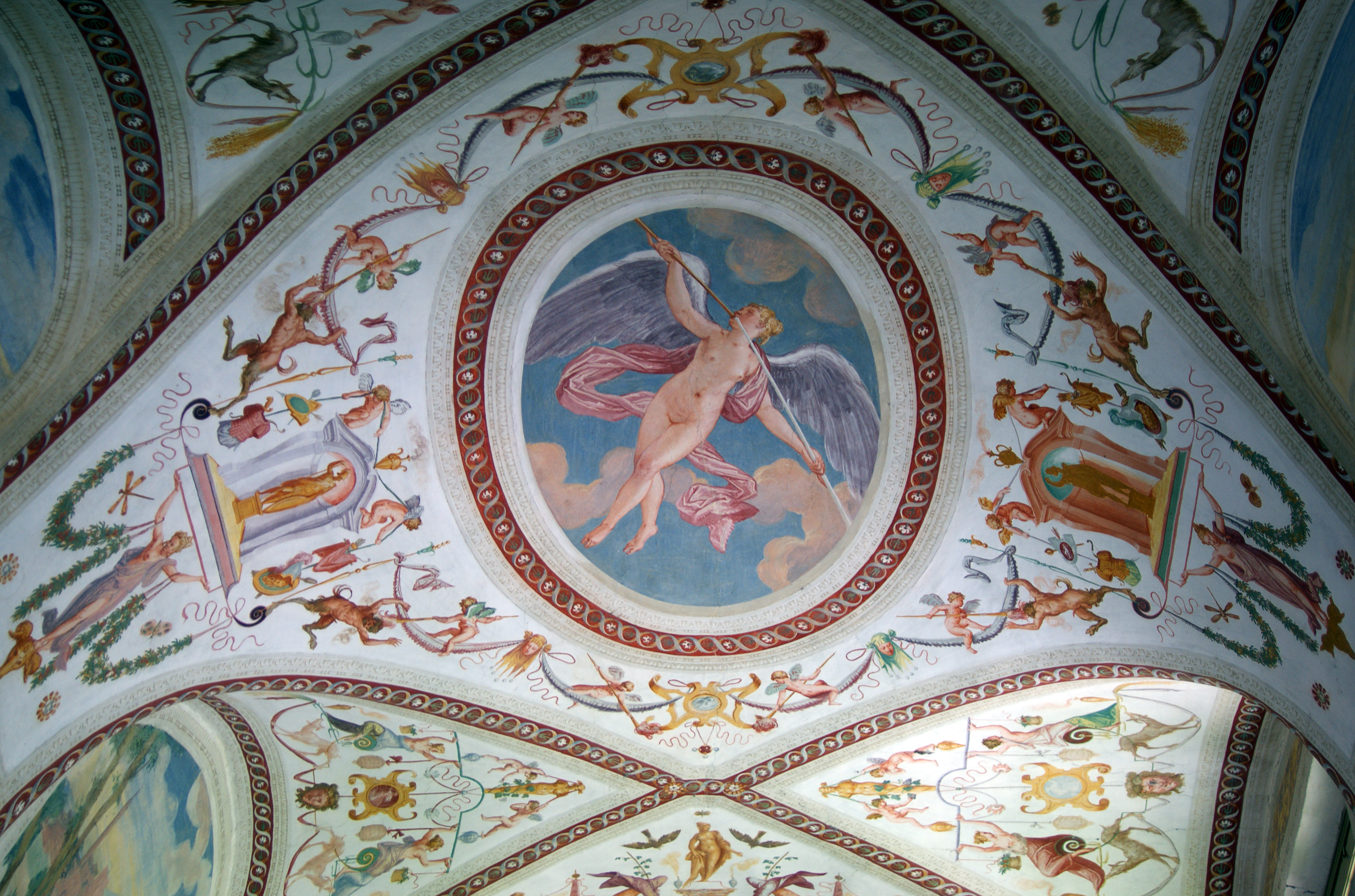
Malcontenta grotesque

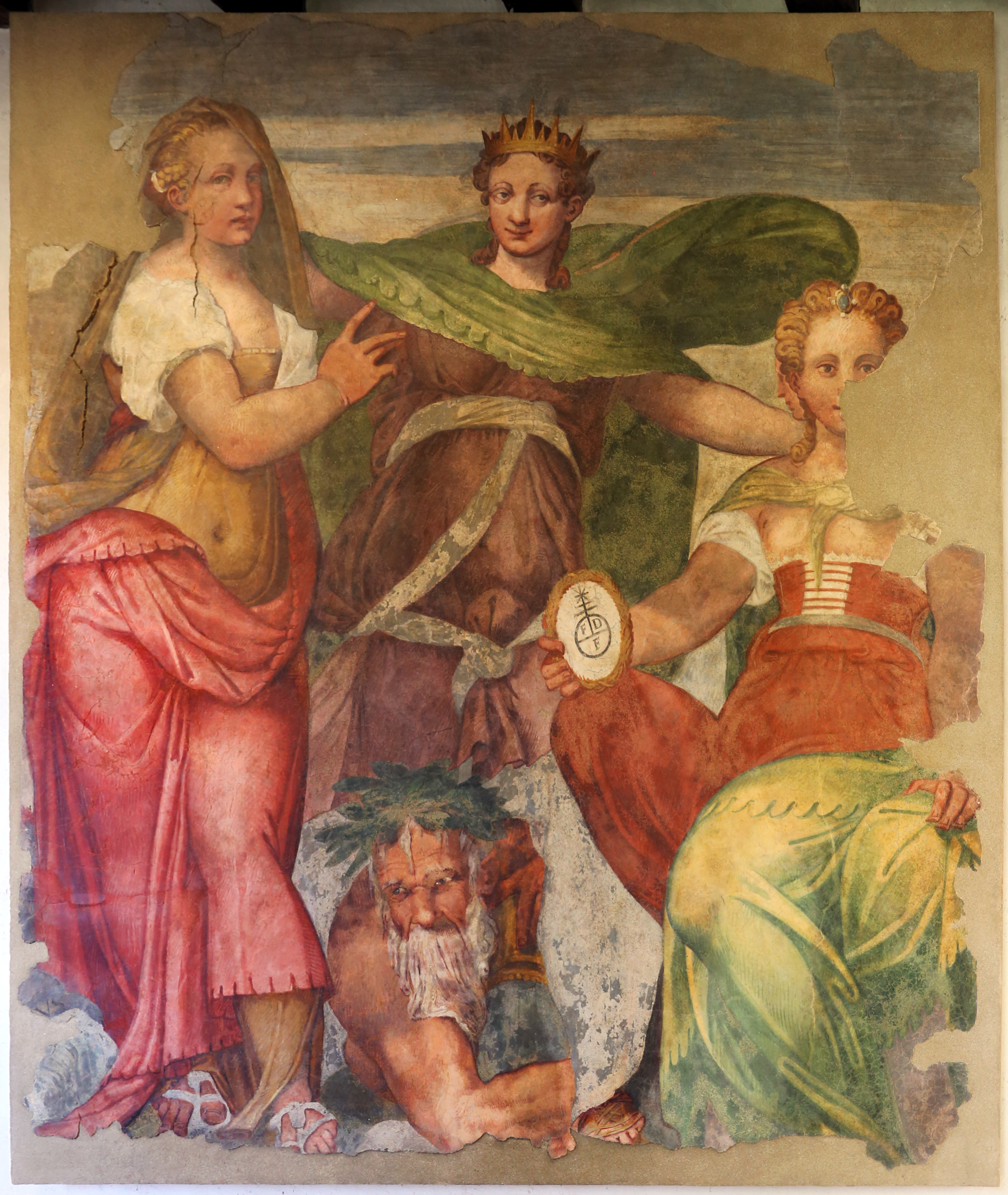
allegorie di verona, rovigo e treviso, palazzo fiorio della seta

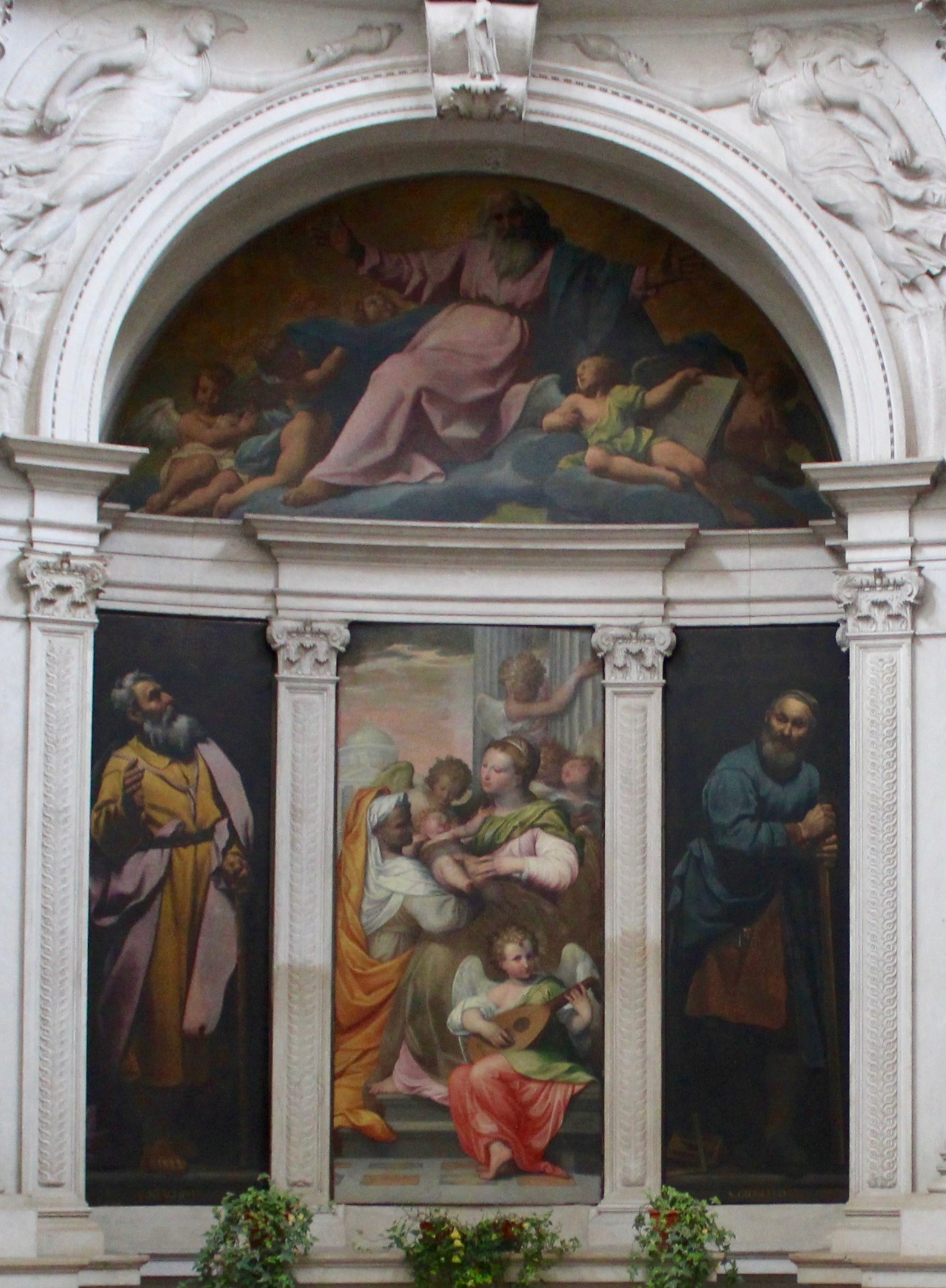
Cappella pellegrini
