= San Bernardino, Verona =

Church in Verona, Italy

Coordinates: 45°26′19″N 10°58′53″E

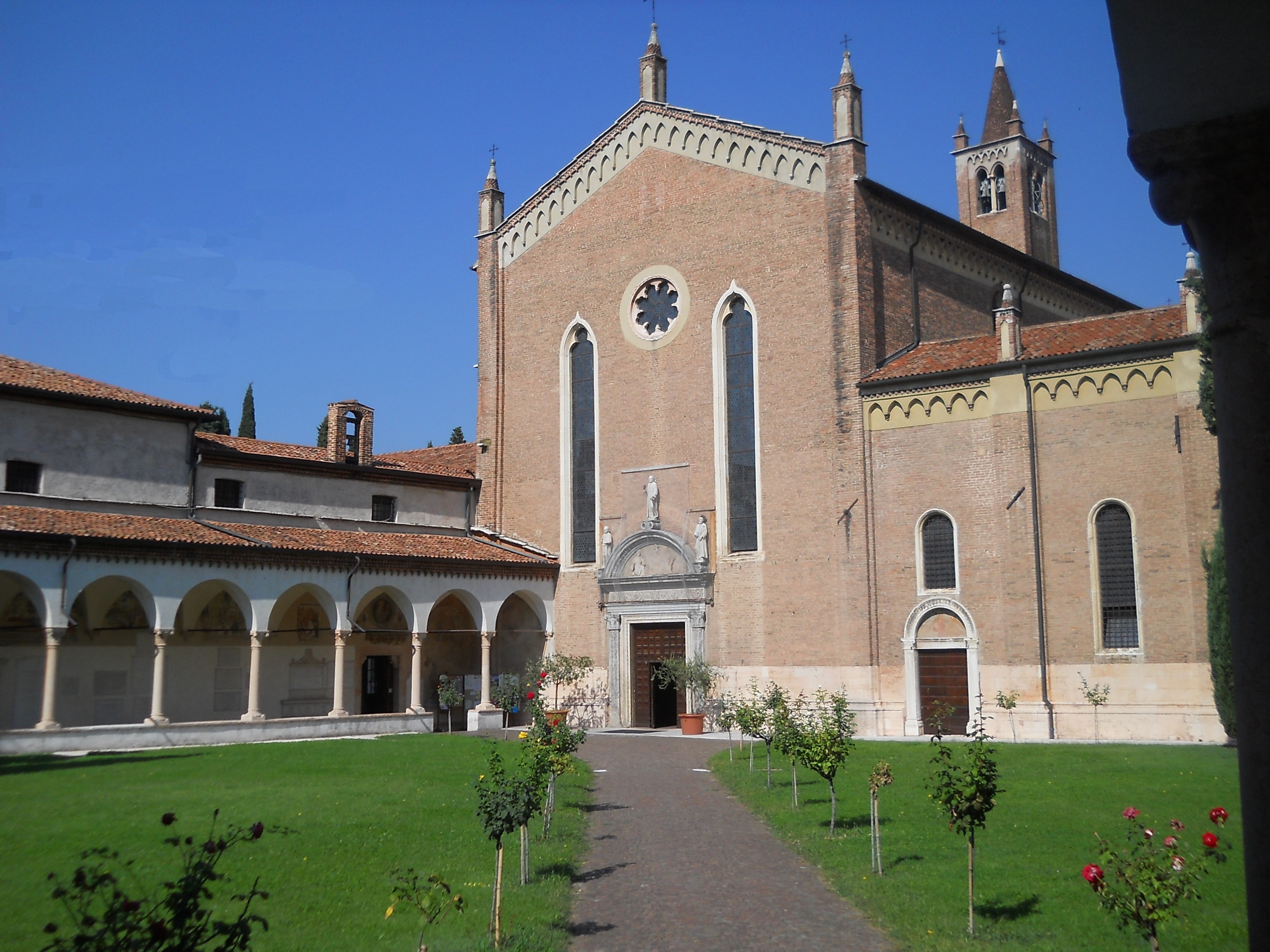
Exterior view of the church

San Bernardino is a church in Verona, northern Italy. The church, in Gothic style, was built from 1451 to 1466.

== History ==
The church's origin are connected to the presence of San Bernardino in the city from 1422, during which he founded a convent of nuns for the order of the Minor Friars and, later, another one for monks. He was canonized in 1450, six years after his death, and in 1451-1452 his successor Giovanni da Capestrano, with the bishop of Verona, Francesco Condulmerio, started the construction of a large complex for the order in Verona, with the support of the Venetian doge Francesco Foscari.

This was consecrated in 1453, though the nave and its ceiling were completed only in 1466. Later a smaller aisle was added. The six bells in E are rung with Veronese bellringing art.

== Overview ==
The church has a nave and a single aisle. The simple façade is in brickwork, with a Renaissance portal decorated by three saints figures.

Notable is the collection of Veronese 16th-century paintings in the six chapels of the aisles. The sixth chapel, patronized by the Pellegrini family, was designed by Michele Sammicheli. The main altarpiece depicts a Madonna and Child with St. Anne and Angels (1579), painted by Bernardino India, while the lunette and flanking pictures depict an Eternal Father and Saints Joseph and Young John the Baptist by Pasquale Ottino.

An inventory from 1845 notes that the main altarpiece was by Francesco Bonfiglio. The altars on the left had an altarpiece depicting Saints Margaret of Cortona, Francis of Assisi, and John by Cavaliere Barca and statues of St Roch and Sebastian by Ceschini. The altar of the Nativity had a painting by India. The altar of the Sacred Heart had a work (1819) by Antonio Vicentini. A canvas depicting the Virgin of the Annunciation was over the main portal, painted by Amigazzi. St Peter of Alcantara was depicted on a canvas by Antonio Balestra.

The first chapel on the right is dedicated to St. Francis or of the Terziari, with frescoes by Nicolò Giolfino (1522) with the stories of St. John the Evangelist and St. Francis. The altarpiece depicting the Glory of the Saint was painted by Francesco Morando. The adjacent altar had an altarpiece depicting the Virgen and San Girolamo by Francesco Monsignori. The next chapel dedicated to St Bonaventure, had an altarpiece by Felice Boscarato. The Altar of the Cross had works by Francesco Morando and Francesco Merone in the altar.

The fourth chapel, dedicated to St Antony, has frescoes by Domenico Morone (1511), in poor state. The fifth, includes a Cruficixion by Domenico's son Francesco Morone (1548).

In the sacristy are paintings by Nicolò Giolfino and Paolo Farinata, and lunettes with the Life of Mary painted by Antonio Voltolini.

Frescoes by Domenico Morone and his son Francesco can be found also in a hall of the annexed convent.

== See also ==
- Pellegrini Chapel (San Bernardino)

== Sources ==
- Borelli, G. (1980). Chiese e monasteri di Verona. Verona: Banca popolare di Verona.

Gene P. Veronesi. The decoration of the Sagramossa Library in the Church of San Bernardino, Verona.Ph.D. dissertation, Case Western Reserve University, 2000.
