= Pojana Maggiore =

- Comune
- Comune di Poiana Maggiore
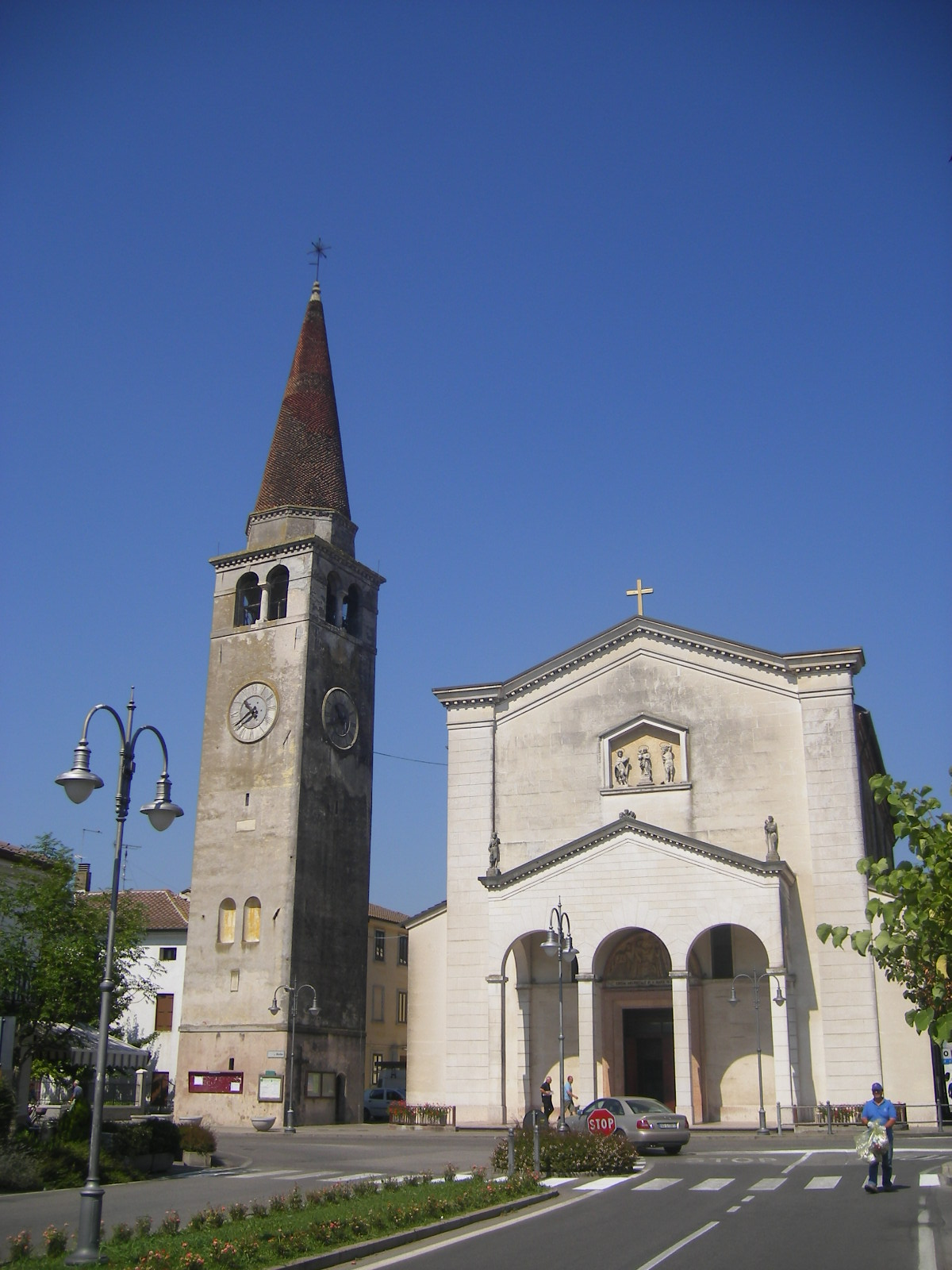
- Church in Pojana Maggiore

- Coat of arms

- Location within Italy Location within Veneto
- Coordinates: 45°17′N 11°30′E
- Country: Italy
- Region: Veneto
- Province: Vicenza (VI)
- Frazioni: Cagnano, Cicogna

Government
  - Mayor: Paola Fortuna

Area
  - Total: 28.62 km^{2} (11.05 sq mi)
- Elevation: 14 m (46 ft)

Population (31 December 2015)
  - Total: 4,336
  - Density: 151.5/km^{2} (392.4/sq mi)
- Demonym: Poianesi
- Time zone: UTC+1 (CET)
  - Summer (DST): UTC+2 (CEST)
- Postal code: 36026
- Dialing code: 0444
- Website: Official website

Pojana Maggiore is a town and comune in the province of Vicenza, Veneto, north-eastern Italy. It is the site of the UNESCO World Heritage Site Villa Pojana, designed by the Renaissance architect Andrea Palladio. The town has reputation for its agriculture. It is bounded by the other communes of Noventa Vicentina and Montagnana.

== Twin towns ==
Pojana Maggiore is twinned with:

- Roana, Italy, since 1996
