= Villa Pojana =

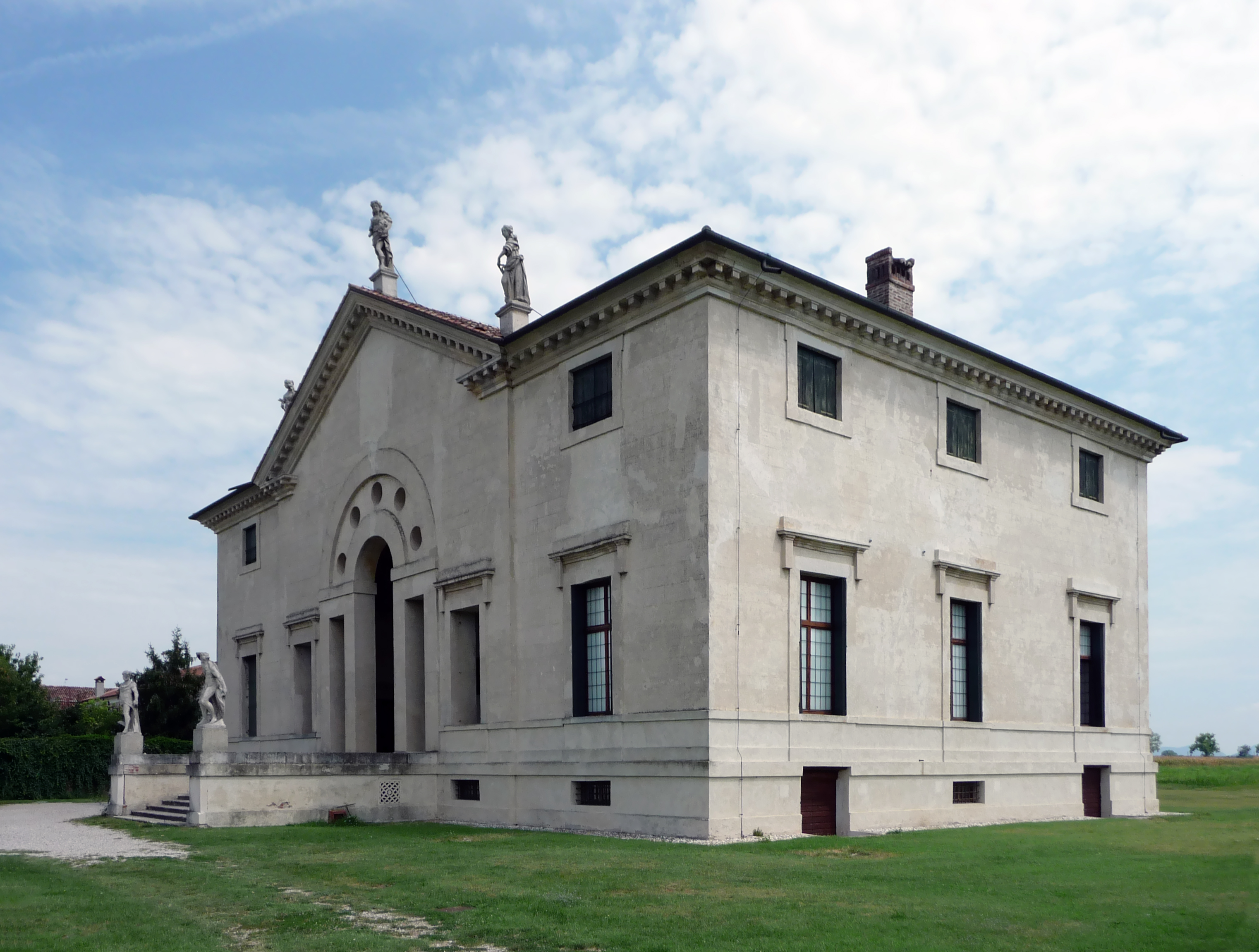
- Front of the villa
- Interactive map of the Villa Pojana area
- Alternative names: Villa Poiana

General information
- Architectural style: Palladian
- Location: Pojana Maggiore, Vicenza, Italy
- Year built: 1548–1549

Design and construction
- Architect: Andrea Palladio

Villa Pojana or Poiana, is a patrician villa in Pojana Maggiore, a town of the Province of Vicenza in the Veneto region of Italy. It was designed by the Italian Renaissance architect Andrea Palladio. It is conserved as part of the UNESCO World Heritage Site "City of Vicenza and the Palladian Villas of the Veneto".

== History ==
The Villa Pojana was built in the years 1548–1549 for Bonifacio Pojana, a member of the Pojana family who had been local landowners for centuries. Bonifacio's military background is expressed on the one hand by the severity and austere purity of the architecture and on the other hand by the decorative programme described below.

== Architecture ==
Palladio's design was inspired by ancient Roman baths, which he had studied during a trip to Rome. The main floor is characterized by a large hall with a barrel vault ceiling (see also Villa Pisani in Bagnolo). At each side of the central hall, secondary rooms extend, each with a different type of vault. Villa Pojana remains one of the most curious examples of Palladian architecture, even though the Villa was never completed and some of its latter development strayed from Palladio's original design. Of what was built, Palladio demonstrated some of his most creative work, especially in the building's main feature on the façade, a serliana with five circular holes (oculi), inspired from ancient Roman models, yet not derivative from any specific source. Other notable elements are the broken pediment, stripped classical features, and statues that depict both military and agricultural deities.

Floor plan from I quattro libri dell'architettura (1570)

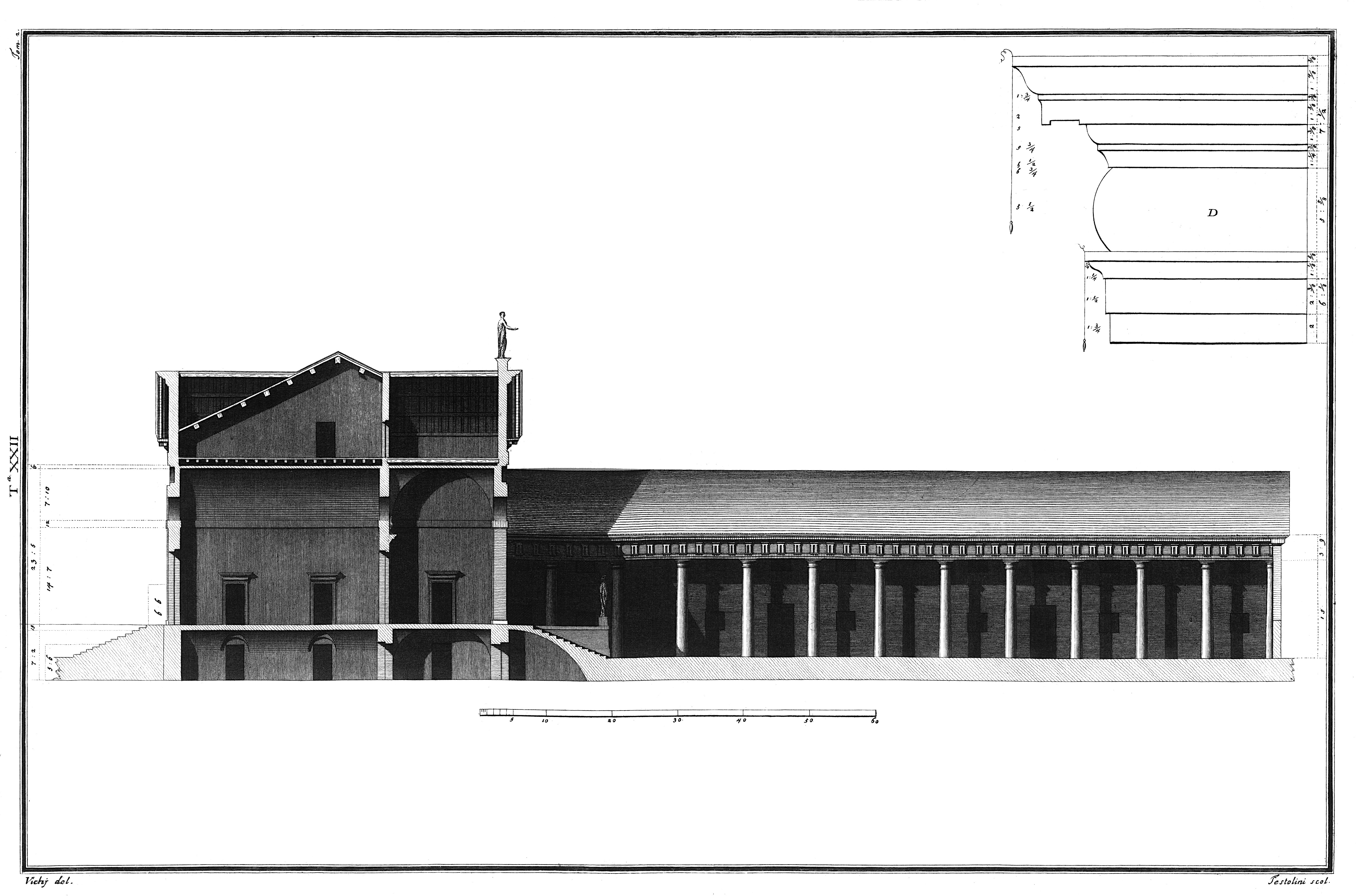
Cross section (drawing by Ottavio Bertotti Scamozzi, 1778)

== Decorative details ==
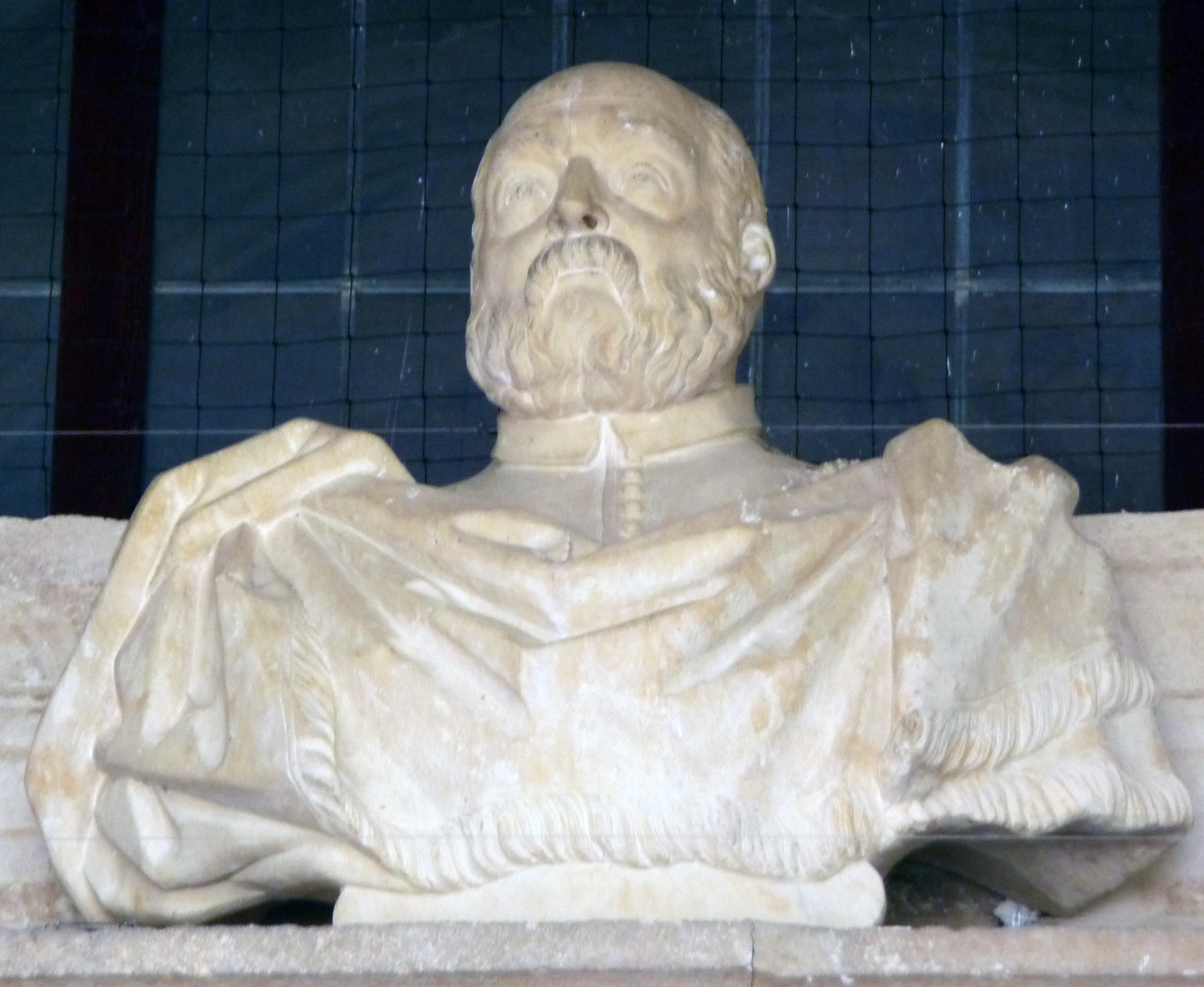
The bust of Bonifacio Pojana, committant of the villa, upon the entrance. The sculpture may be a work of Bartolomeo Ridolfi, author of the stuccos.

Palladio himself documented the interior decorations as being by Bernardino India, Anselmo Canera, and Bartolomeo Ridolfi. Canera and India were both painters of the frescos (India of the grotesques), while Ridolfi was a decorator and sculptor, responsible for stuccos and all fireplaces.

In the atrium, elegant stucco frames, whose floral designs entwine around trompe-l'œil reliefs, enclose monochromes of river gods, while here and there appear patches of sky populated with other deities. The bust of Bonifacio Pojana looks down from over the main entrance, and above him are the family's coat of arms and military trophies. Other decorations depict Pompeian scenes with the backgrounds and landscapes strewn with picturesque ruins and broken columns, whilst monochromatic figures of warriors stand watch in the trompe-l'œil niches. The frescoed ceiling, with the allegory of Fortuna, is attributed to Giovanni Battista Zelotti.

The most significant fresco can be found in the central hall: called the Emperors' Salon it shows a family from classical times, dressed in tunics and togas. They kneel in front of an altar whilst the pater familias extinguishes the torch of war at the feet of the statue of Peace which stands on the altar. It is a clear allusion to the peace painfully achieved in the sixteenth century after the War of the League of Cambrai which allowed Venetians to enjoy the delights of the terra firma.

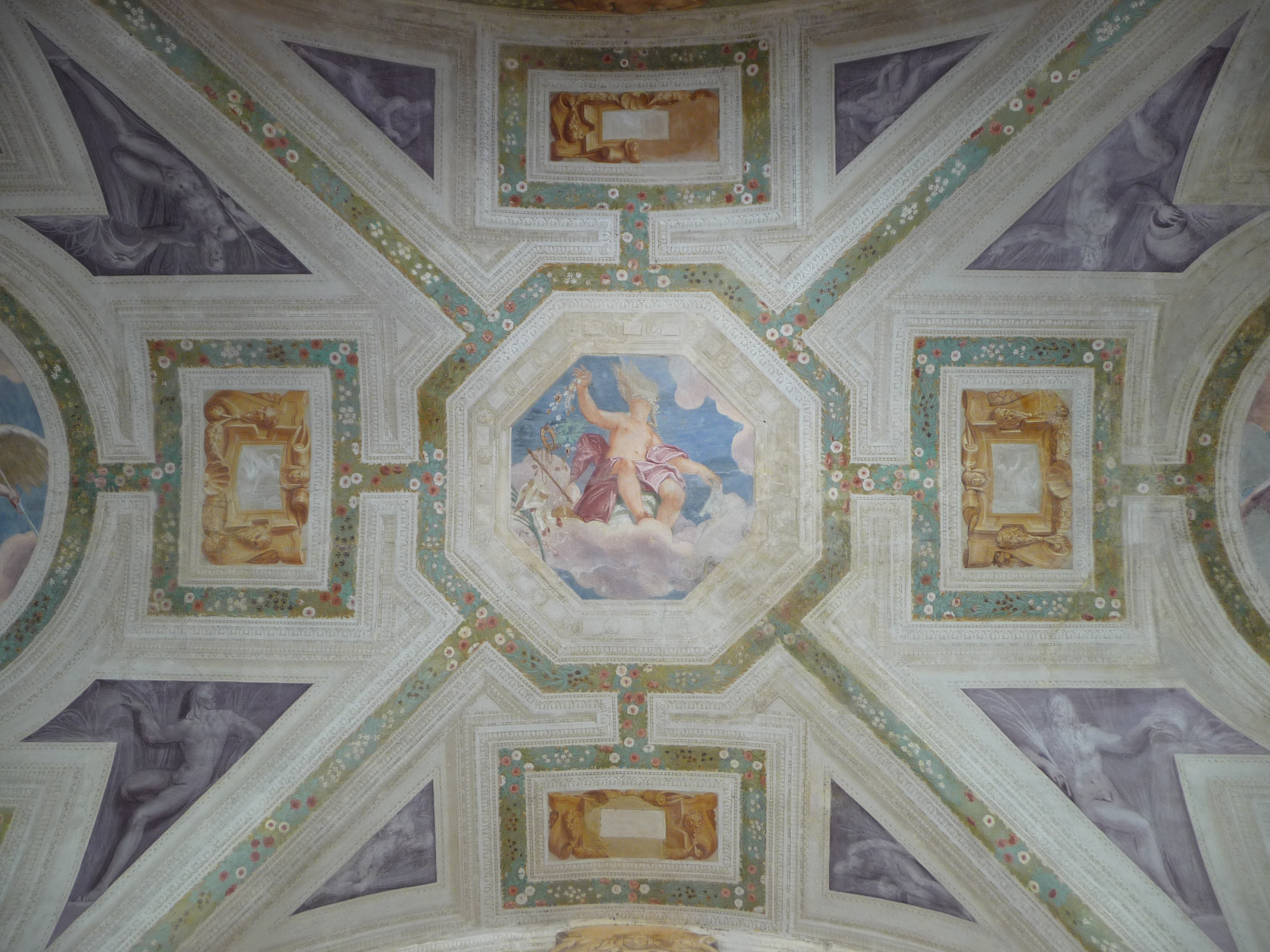
The atrium ceiling fresco, with the allegory of Fortuna attributed to Giovanni Battista Zelotti

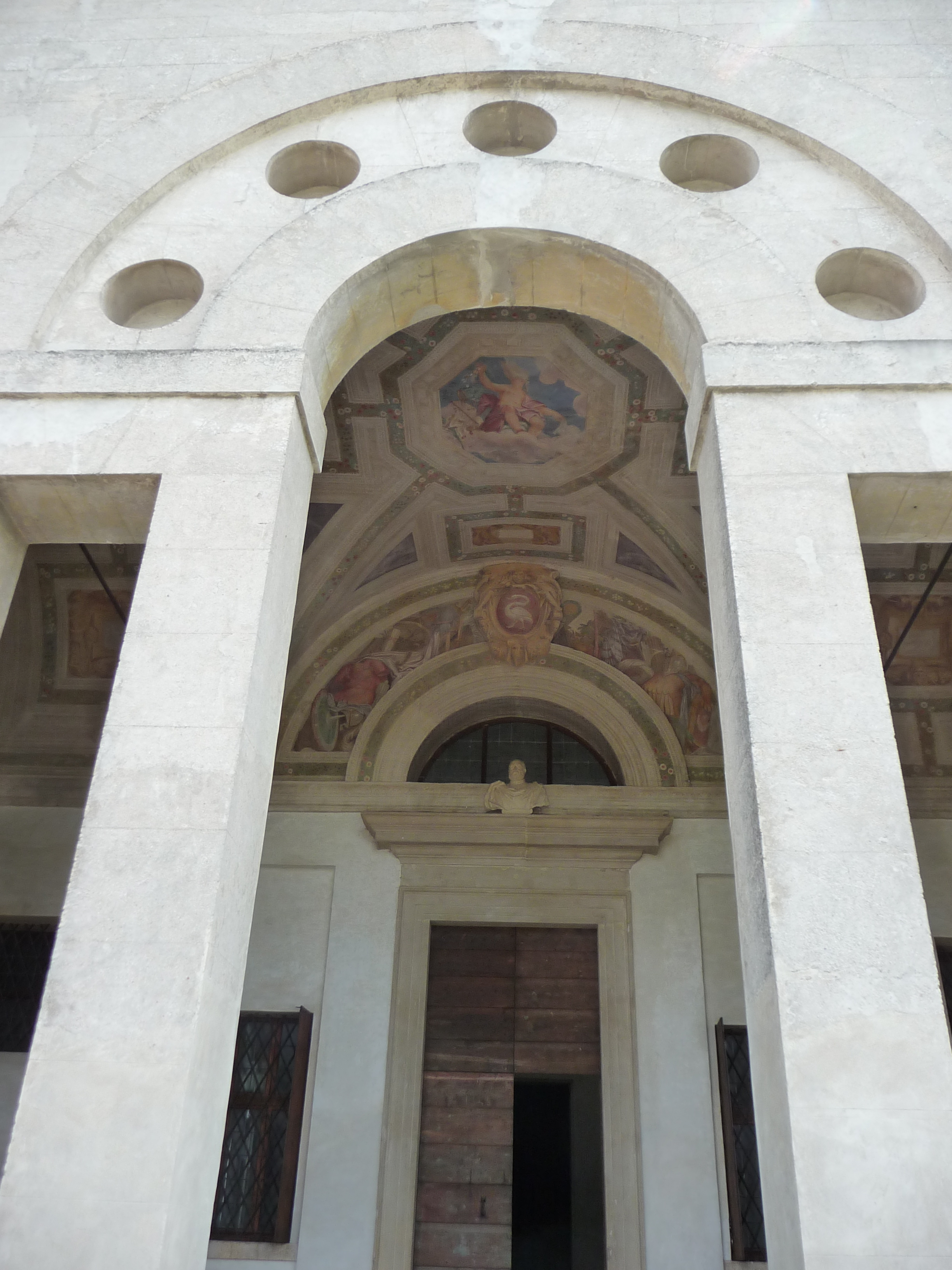
The serliana of the atrium, with the family's coat of arms and military trophies.

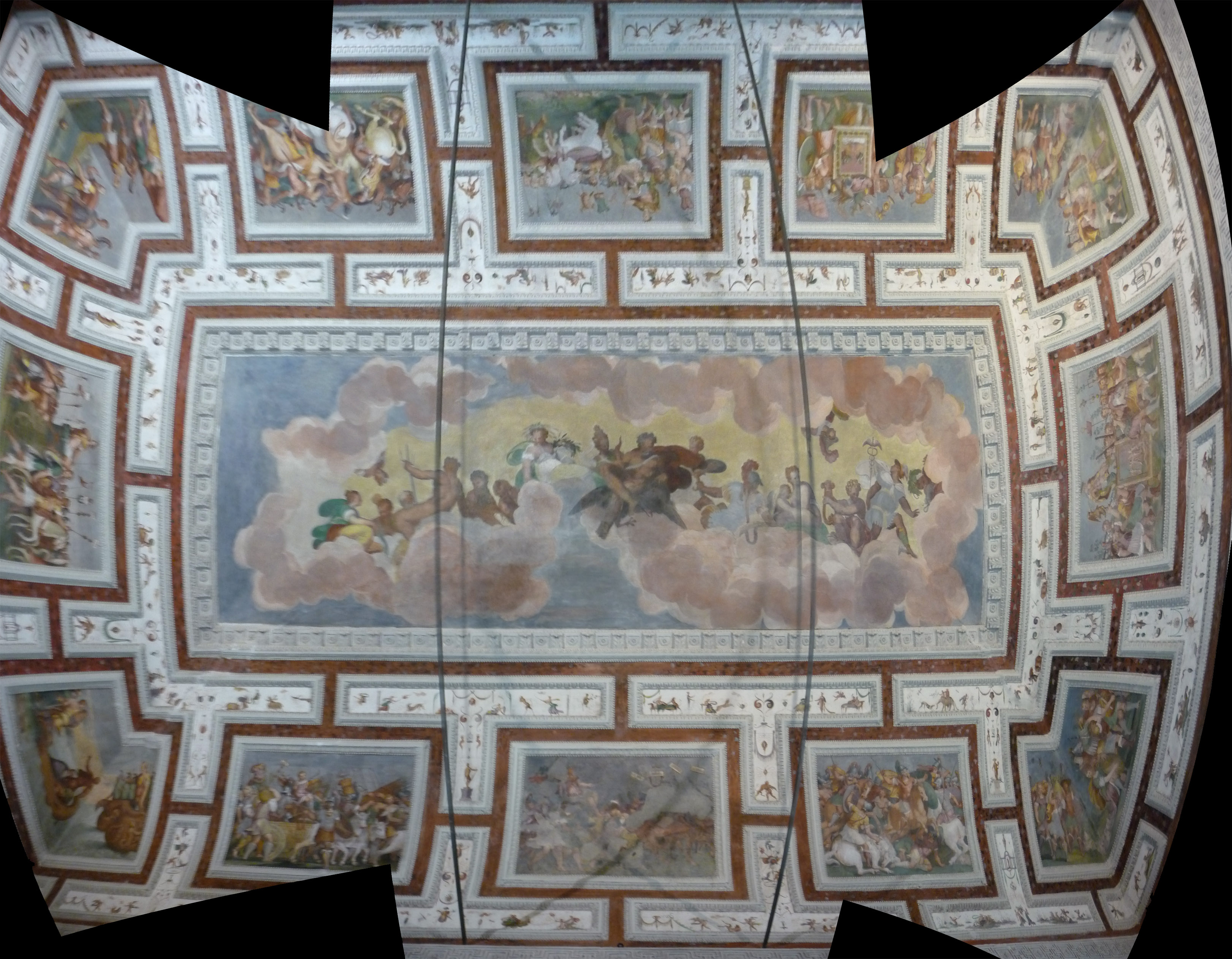
Decorations on the ceiling of the Emperors' Salon (frescos by Anselmo Canera and grotesques by Bernardino India)

== See also ==
- Palladian Villas of the Veneto
- Palazzo Pojana, Vicenza
