= Pellegrini Chapel (San Bernardino) =

Chapel in Verona, Italy

Coordinates: 45°26′20″N 10°58′53″E

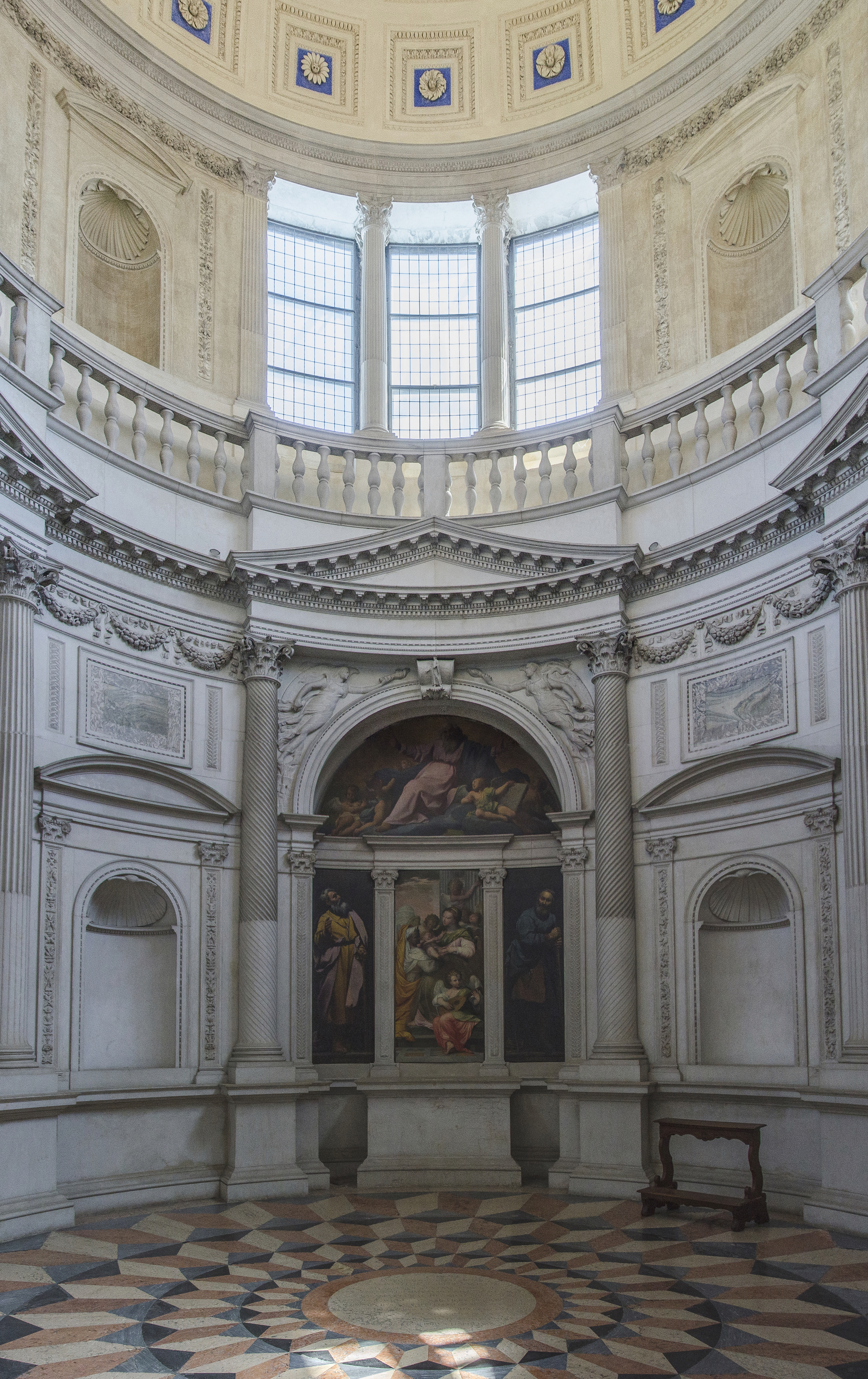
- The interior of the Pellegrini Chapel, formerly Guaresco, designed by Renaissance architect Michele Sanmicheli
- Pellegrini Chapel
- Location: Verona, Veneto, Italy
- Denomination: Catholic

Architecture
- Architect: Michele Sanmicheli
- Style: Renaissance architecture
- Groundbreaking: 1528
- Completed: 1559

Administration
- Diocese: Roman Catholic Diocese of Verona

The Pellegrini Chapel (Italian: Cappella Pellegrini), initially named "Guaresco," (Note: "This chapel was for a long time called Guaresco from the noble name of the Raimondi family, and it was kept until the College of Notaries in Verona (so willed by the testatrix) sustained its patronage." In Ronzani, p. 13.) is a religious building commissioned by Countess Margherita Pellegrini to the famous architect Michele Sanmicheli and built between 1528 and 1559. It occupies a prominent place in Renaissance architecture. (Note: On this subject Giorgio Vasari, in the 1568 edition of his The Lives of the Most Excellent Painters, Sculptors and Architects, writes: "Michele was excellent not only in fortifications, but also in private buildings, in temples, churches and monasteries, as can be seen in Verona and elsewhere in many buildings, particularly in the very beautiful and ornate Guareschi chapel in San Bernardino, made round for the use of a temple and of Corinthian order, with all those ornaments of which that style is capable. [... ] For being therefore from within the said chapel of this beautiful stone and worked by excellent masters of carving and very well commissioned, it is held that for a similar work there is no other more beautiful in Italy today, Michele having made the whole work round in such a manner, that the three altars that are in it with their frontispieces and cornices, and similarly the doorway, all turn in a perfect round, almost in the likeness of the exits that Filippo Brunelleschi made in the chapels of the temple of the Angels in Florence, which is a very difficult thing to do.")

It is located within the Franciscan complex of San Bernardino in Verona, which consists of a Gothic-style church and a series of valuable cloisters and became a coveted place for Verona's noble families to build their aristocratic chapels between the 15th and 16th centuries.

== History ==
=== Sanmicheli's design and direction ===
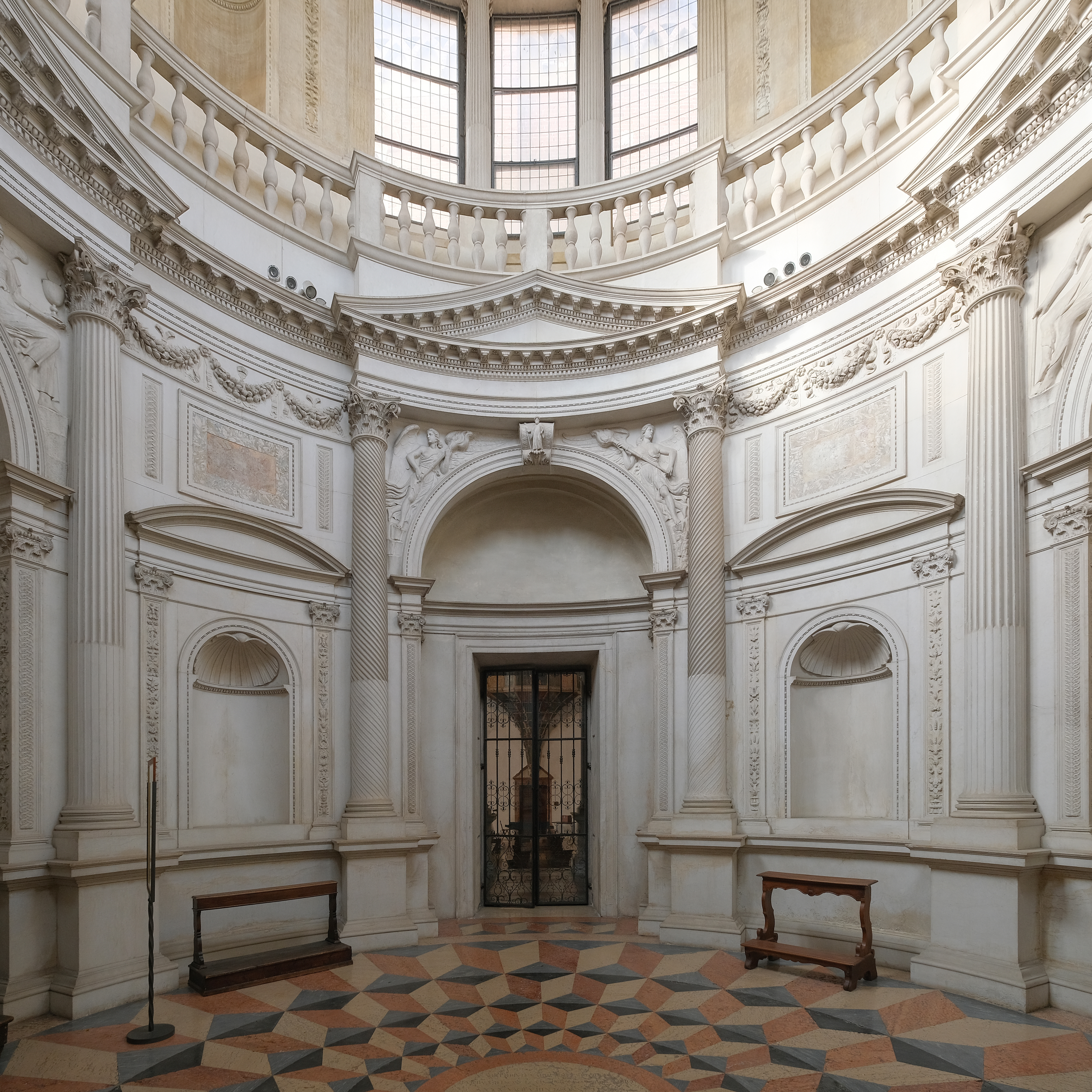
The first order of the Renaissance chapel, built under the direction of Sanmicheli

Around 1527, having finished his stay in Rome and before being commissioned to build important fortifications for the Venetian Republic, Michele Sanmicheli resided in Verona with his cousin Paolo, with whom he collaborated on numerous construction sites. During that period he had the opportunity to associate with several noble families, befriending Guaresco Raimondi, father-in-law of Countess Margherita Pellegrini. The life of the Veronese noblewoman was ravaged by serious family bereavements, including the death of her husband Benedetto Raimondi, two children, Nicola and Anna, her father-in-law and finally, in 1528, her 18-year-old son Niccolò, with whom the line of descent of the Raimondi-Pellegrini family was permanently interrupted.

This chapel, originally dedicated to St. Anne, was thus desired by Pellegrini to commemorate the death of her son but equally to celebrate herself and the family to which she belonged: the building was to serve as a funerary monument to contain the remains of the patron and her family members, although the final result betrayed this project. The idea of building a chapel, rather than a simpler tomb, probably came to her after she learned of the construction of the Emilei chapel at the church of San Michele in Isola, while the decision to have such a monumental work erected certainly contributed to the fact that it took on the significance of wanting to hand down to posterity the importance of the family, which was destined to disappear.

The design of the work was entrusted to Sanmicheli, who created a space endowed with a great harmony of parts and a clear distribution of light, with an architecture reminiscent of ancient buildings, particularly the Pantheon in Rome, Porta Borsari and the Gavi Arch in Verona. Construction began between the second half of 1528, after Niccolò's death, and October 15, 1529, the date of one of Margherita Pellegrini's wills, in which it is confirmed that work had already begun.

=== Controversy and completion by the Marastoni ===
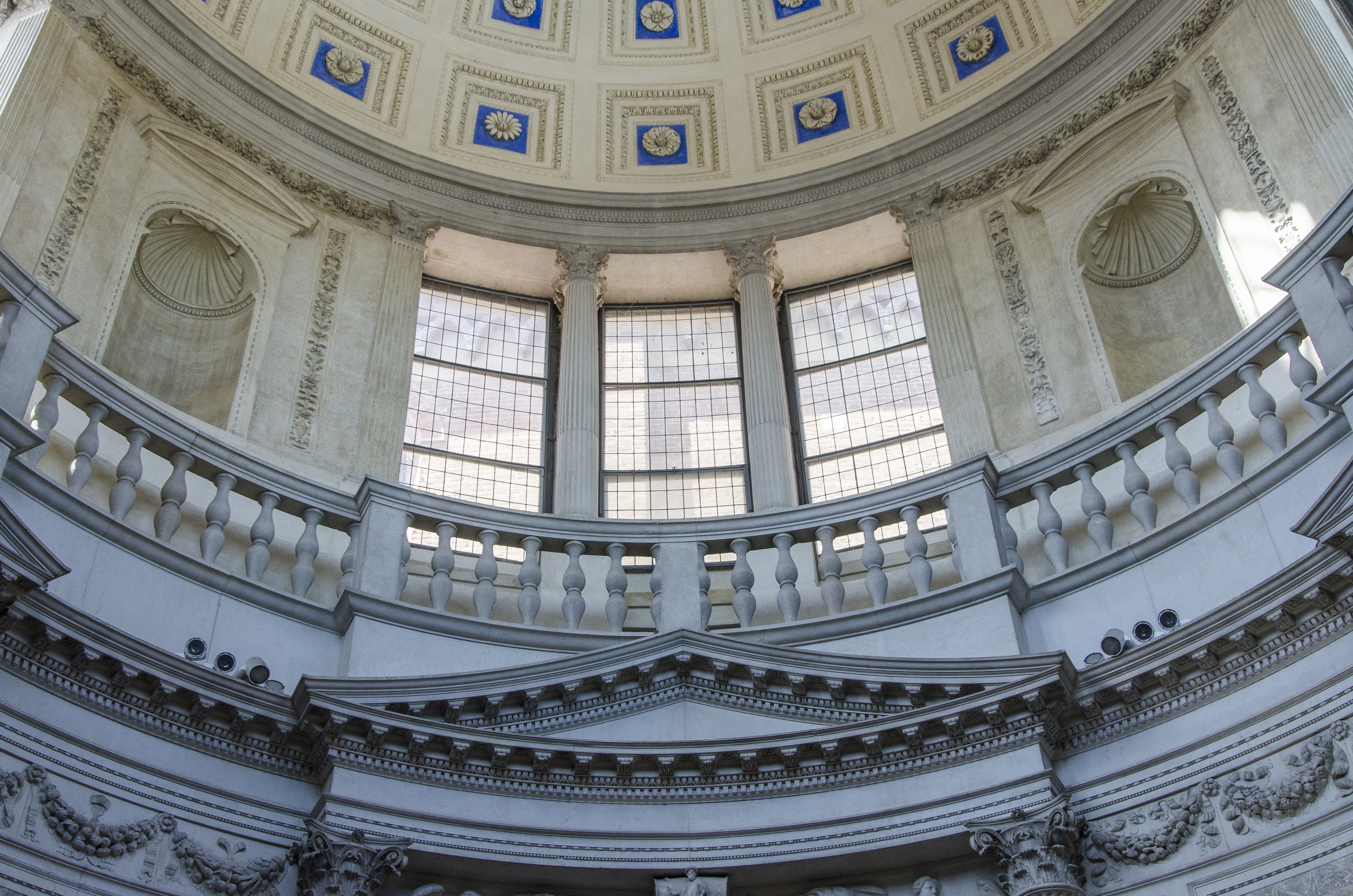
The second order of the chapel, built to a design by Sanmicheli but by independent workers, then restored during the eighteenth century so as to better fit the original design

Initially Sanmicheli personally directed the work, but in 1534 he had to abandon it to go to Venice for further assignments, so his cousin Paolo took over the direction of the building site. Disagreeing over some contractual issues, on July 8, 1538 Margherita obtained from the podestà of Verona the cancellation of the contract and compensation for damages. From then on, the architect and his collaborators no longer worked on the building.

The countess's dislike of Paolo Sanmicheli's management of the building site was due to her eagerness to see the chapel completed, given her precarious health condition: seeing that the work was proceeding very slowly caused her anxiety and concern. In addition, among the reasons that led to the dismissal of the Sanmicheli cousins was probably the high cost of the work, which was characterized (like Michele's other early works) by a rich and articulate decorative apparatus, combining elements and themes from Verona's Roman monuments with the proportions and modules of Renaissance architecture.

The workshop assigned to continue the work turned out to be that of the Marastoni stonemasons, who found the chapel already completed up to the height of the balcony with parapet. Despite the changes made during the work, which included the use of less noble materials and a decidedly simpler style, the new artisans were unable to speed up the work. The Marastoni, in fact, took nineteen years to complete the work, which the client did not manage to see completed. Pellegrini's last will is dated September 24, 1557, and reports that the monument was still being completed, which is why she requested that the construction of the chapel continue after her death and that the building be kept in good condition. The noblewoman died shortly after the document was drafted while the work was completed in 1559.

=== Giuliari's restoration work ===
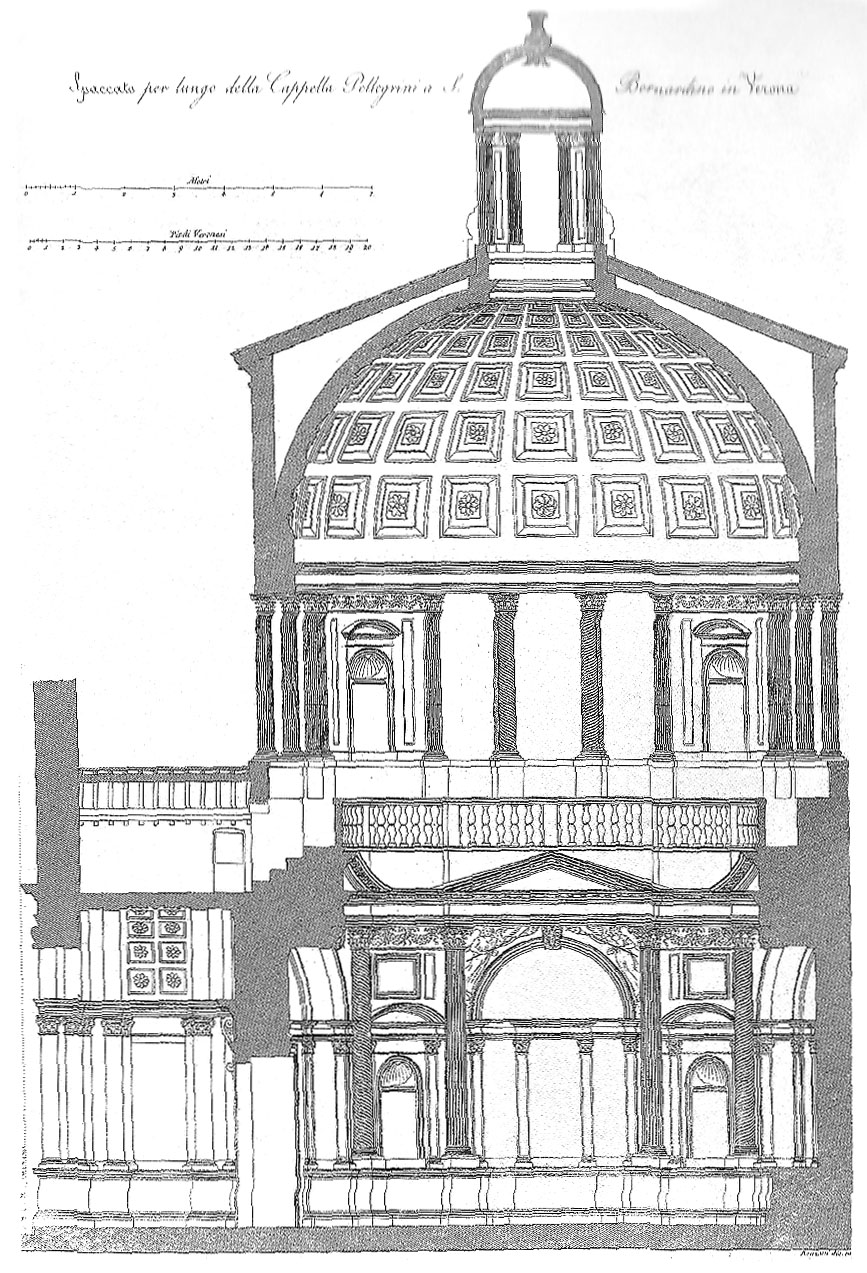
Longitudinal section of the vestibule and chapel: the second order and the dome with lantern, made by the Marastoni, were modified to the design of Bartolomeo Giuliari, who sought greater compliance with the Sanmichelian design

After two centuries of neglect, in 1793, Abbot Giuseppe Luigi Pellegrini became interested in the work and decided to restore it with the approval of his brother Carlo Pellegrini, marshal of the Austrian Empire. The work was directed by architect Bartolomeo Giuliari, who had previously been involved in restorations of Sanmichelian works, and who preliminarily carried out an accurate survey of the state of the monument. This made it possible to note how in the continuation of the work the Marastoni no longer used the so-called "bronze," a refined white Veronese stone so called because of the sound it emits during its working, employed particularly for ornaments, but rather exploited less noble material. Moreover, the stonemasons reduced the quantity and quality of decoration, so that the walls were bare, the columns and pilasters lacked fluting and the capitals lacked carvings.

Giuliari's project thus went on to add, to the portion of the chapel built by the Marastoni, a rich decorative apparatus in stone and stucco, so as to bring the appearance of the monument closer to Sanmicheli's original design. In particular, on the dome the opening of the lantern was restored through the removal of the rose window that decorated the top, while the coffers were rearranged with better proportions, according to those suggested by Piranesi, with dimensions sloping upward and defining each coffer with a series of three cornices and a flower in the center. In the second order, however, they carved some decorations on the cornice and leaves on the capitals, fluted the columns and pilasters, and introduced raised festoons under the architrave, similar to what had already been done in the first order.

The work, completed in 1795, thus went on to re-establish a decorative and stylistic continuity between the first and second orders, where the work of the Marastoni had impoverished the Sanmichelian architecture, even if it meant designing and executing a rather invasive intervention.

=== Conservation interventions ===
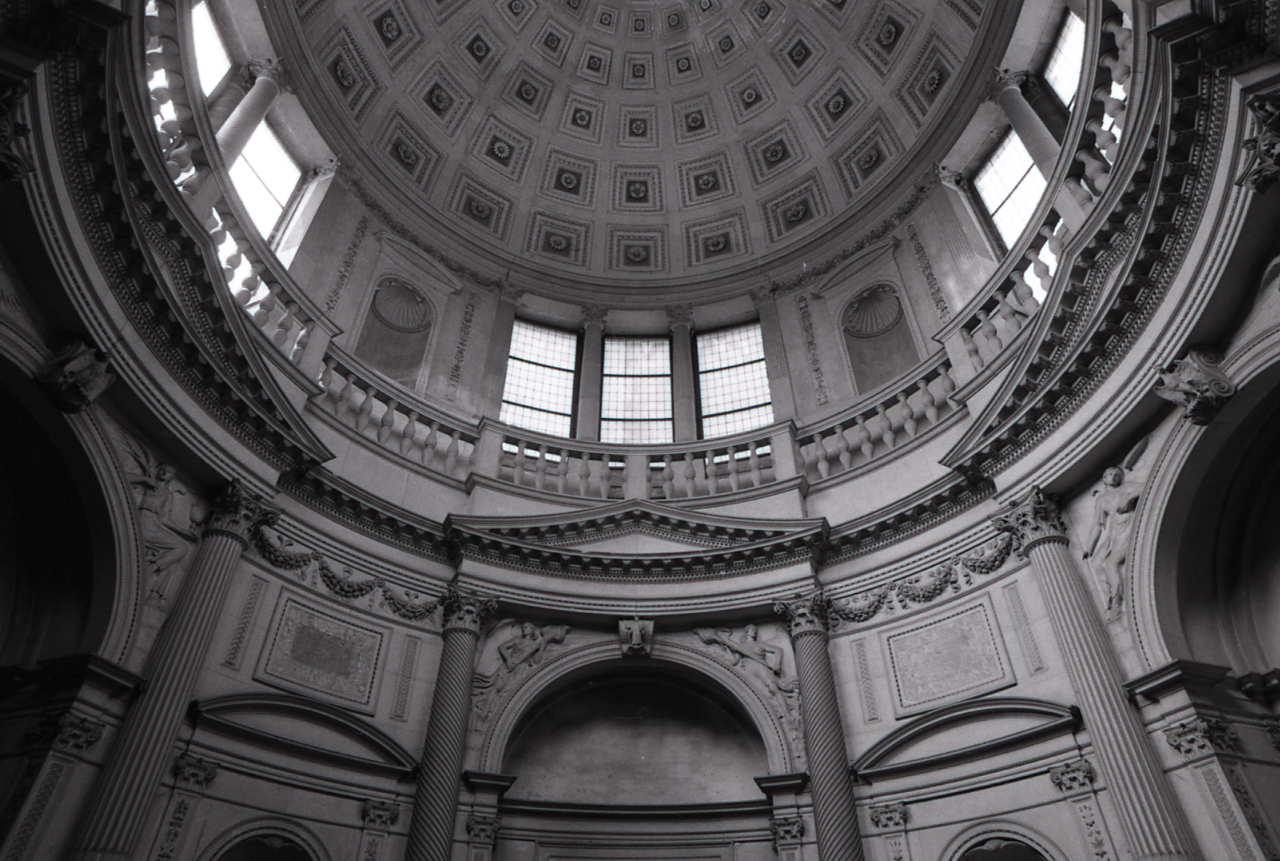
Photograph taken by Paolo Monti in 1972, from which some deterioration can be seen on the intrados of the dome, caused by water infiltration

During the twentieth century, the monument was the subject of several restorations, mainly aimed at solving problems of infiltration and humidity, financed partly by the religious order and partly with contributions from the state, banks and various foundations, but always conducted under the supervision of the local Superintendence.

After years of poor maintenance that had resulted in a certain level of deterioration inside the aristocratic chapel, at the urging of the owners, represented by engineer Ottorino Pellegrini, in 1925 action was taken with the restoration of the dome and lantern: the roofing was redone, the window frames and decorations of the cupola were restored, and the stained glass windows of the lantern were replaced. The construction site was supervised by the Royal Superintendence of Monuments of Verona, headed by engineer Alessandro Da Lisca.

In the decades following World War II, the roof and the stained glass windows were repaired on several occasions: in the early 1960s, when the Superintendence contributed an expenditure of 1,200,000 liras; in 1971, with Superintendent Piero Gazzola overseeing the work of re-roofing, with replacement of purlins, planking and brick tiles, for an amount of about 600,000 liras; finally between 1987 and 1993, when with a state grant of 150,000,000 liras, the restoration of the roof (consolidation of the wooden ribs, restoration of the brick eave cornice and insertion of eaves channels) and the lantern (lead lining of the canopy and recomposition and plumbing of the windows) continued.

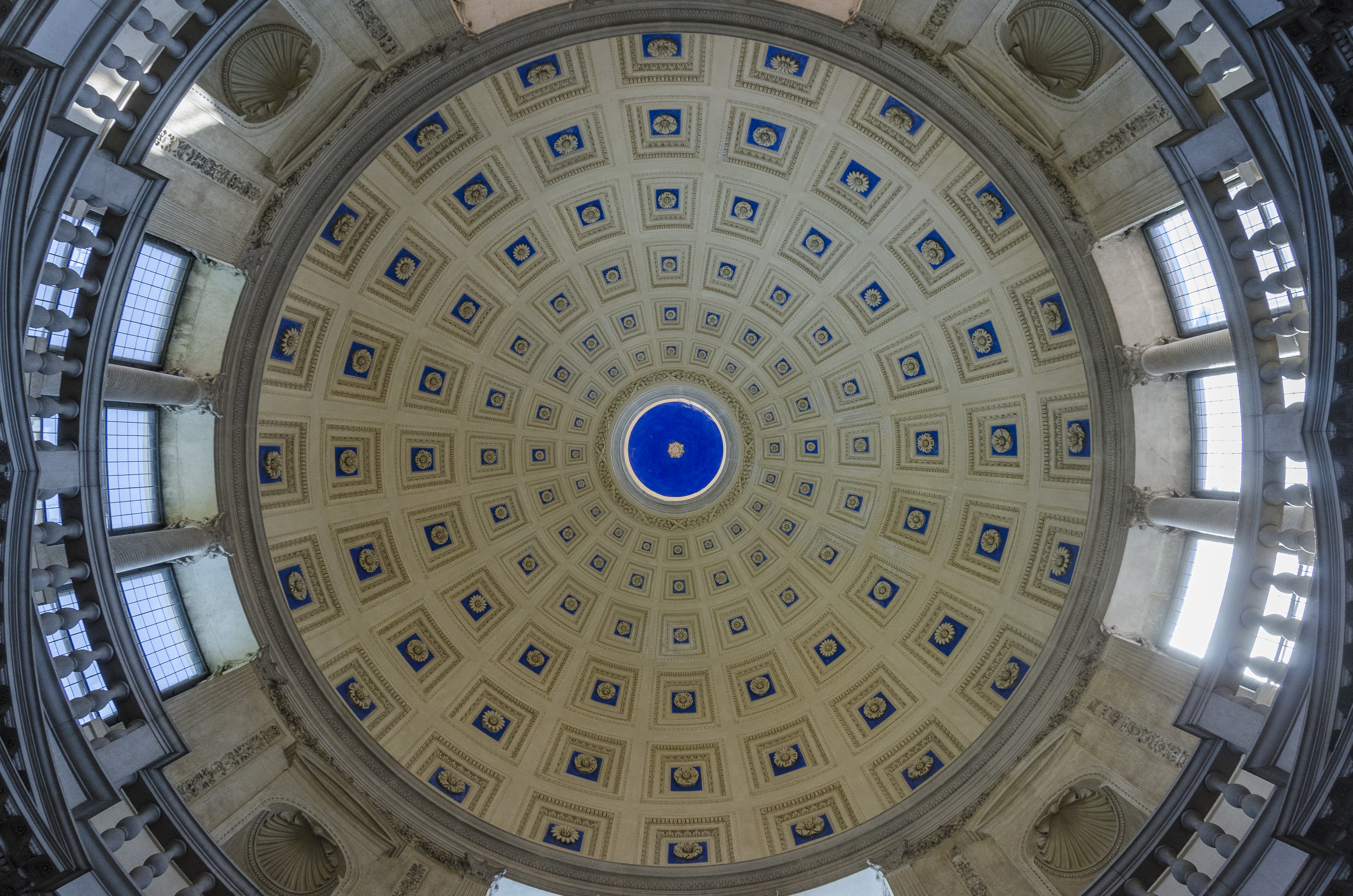
Overhead view of the dome and lantern at the end of the series of restoration work carried out during the twentieth century

Considerable conservation work finally took place between 1987 and 2000, supervised by the Superintendence official Pietro Maria Cevese. During the work, efforts were made to solve problems related to rising damp in the perimeter walls of the structure, as well as water infiltration from the glass windows of the drum. The opportunity was taken to carry out work to clean the stone surfaces of the chapel and vestibule, as well as to restore the plaster, stucco and coloring; in particular, the original colors of the dome were recovered, with the reappearance of the blue background in the coffers.

== Description ==
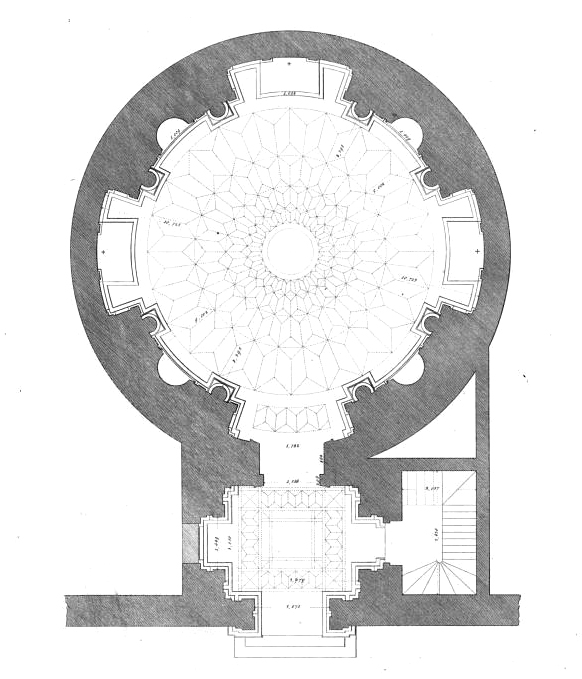
Plan of the first level of the chapel, with the entrance vestibule

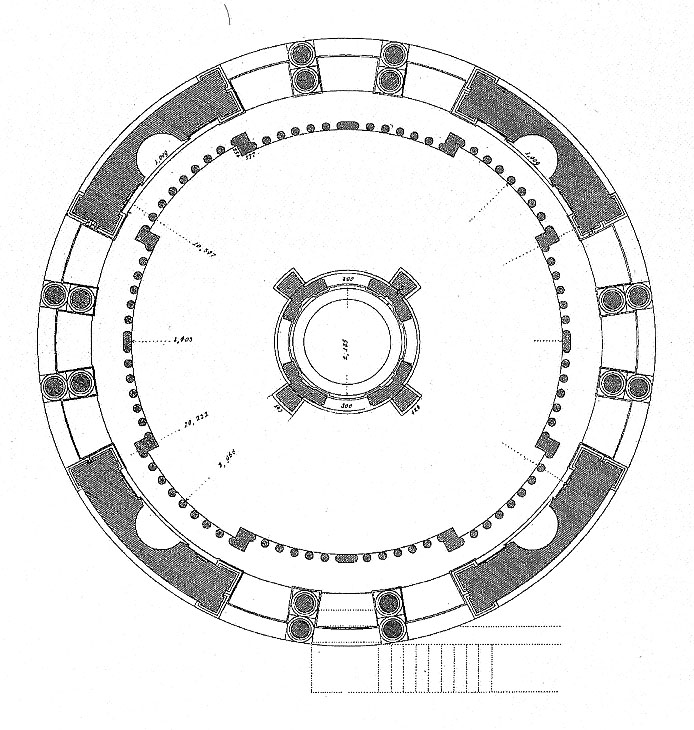
Plan of the second level of the chapel, with the projection of the lantern

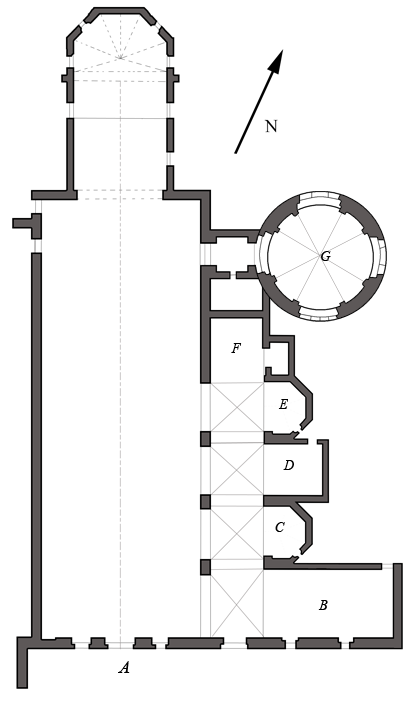
The Pellegrini Chapel (G) inside the church of San Bernardino

The presence of Michele Sanmicheli's preliminary designs in the Uffizi Gallery has made it possible to learn about the evolutionary stages of the work: the Veronese architect, in fact, at first planned to build a chapel with a Greek-cross plan larger than the one actually realized; externally, then, the surface was to be more articulated and decorated thanks to the presence of tall pilasters, of Corinthian order placed on pedestals, and the dome, visible even from outside. A monumental project, taking inspiration from the Pantheon in Rome and Raphael's Chigi Chapel in the Basilica of Santa Maria del Popolo. The final design underwent numerous changes, yet the work retained a solemn appearance, especially inside.

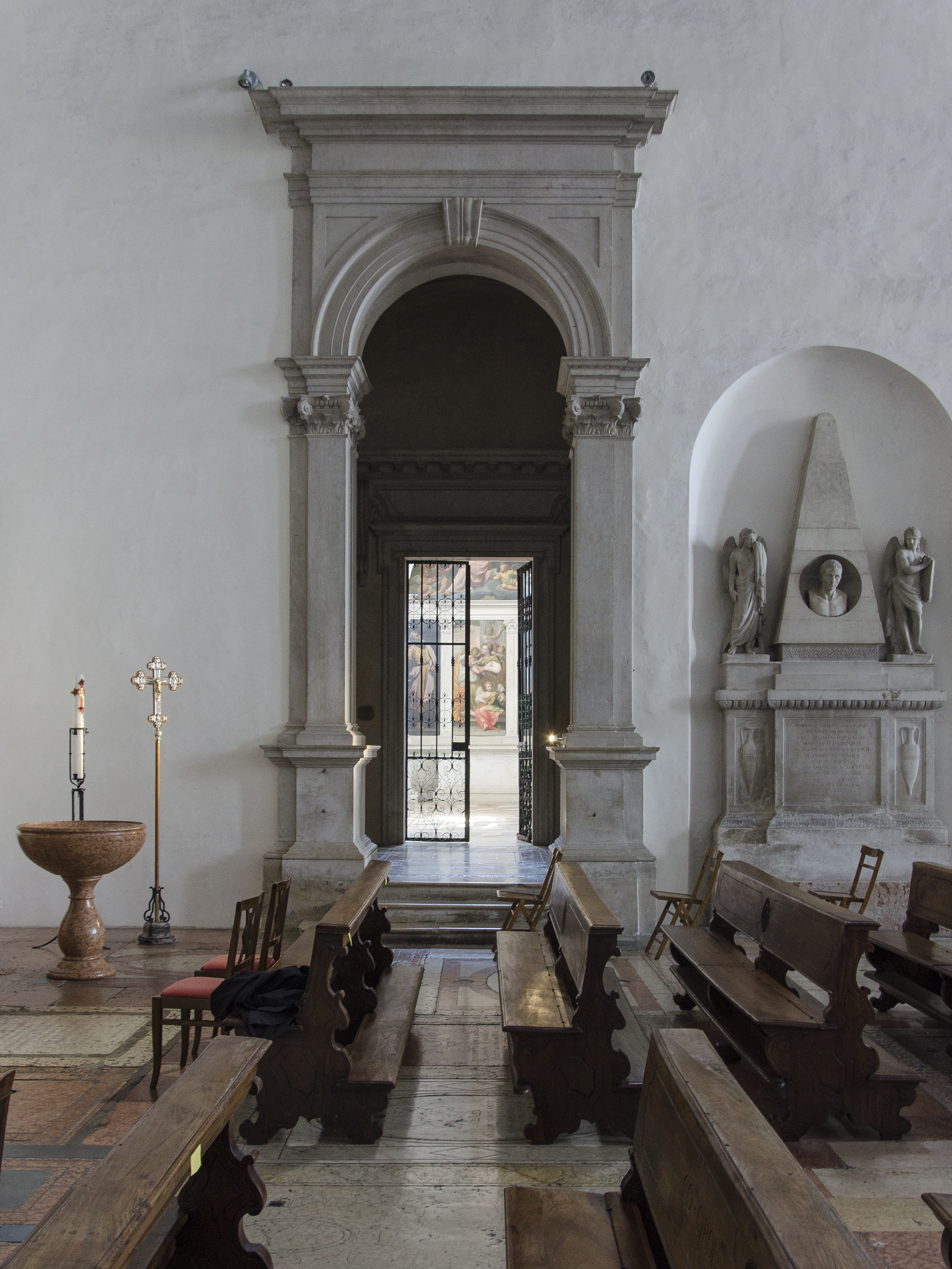
The monumental entrance portal to the vestibule and to the chapel

The chapel is accessible exclusively from the church hall through a monumental entrance portal, from which one is first ushered into a square vestibule, covered by a coffered barrel vault, and then into the building proper, through a second portal. The monumental vestibule is a rather original solution and a result of the need to prevent the structure from interfering with the Avanzi and Medici chapels already present in San Bernardino. The building has a circular plan with a diameter of 12 meters and a height of 20.5 meters, divided into two orders by a balcony with parapet and covered by a coffered dome crowned by a lantern; the diameter of the first order is smaller than that of the upper one, a feature that distinguishes this chapel from others, where, moreover, the dome often stands directly on the first order.

While the exterior is devoid of decoration and the dome is adorned by a lantern, a style that is well suited to the sobriety of the Franciscan spirit, the interior, on the other hand, is distinguished by a compact and rigorous articulation of space and by the presence of an elegant decorative apparatus, which clearly echoes that of Porta Borsari, such as the alternation of vertical and twisted fluting, the rhythm of projections and recesses, and the giant tabernacles.

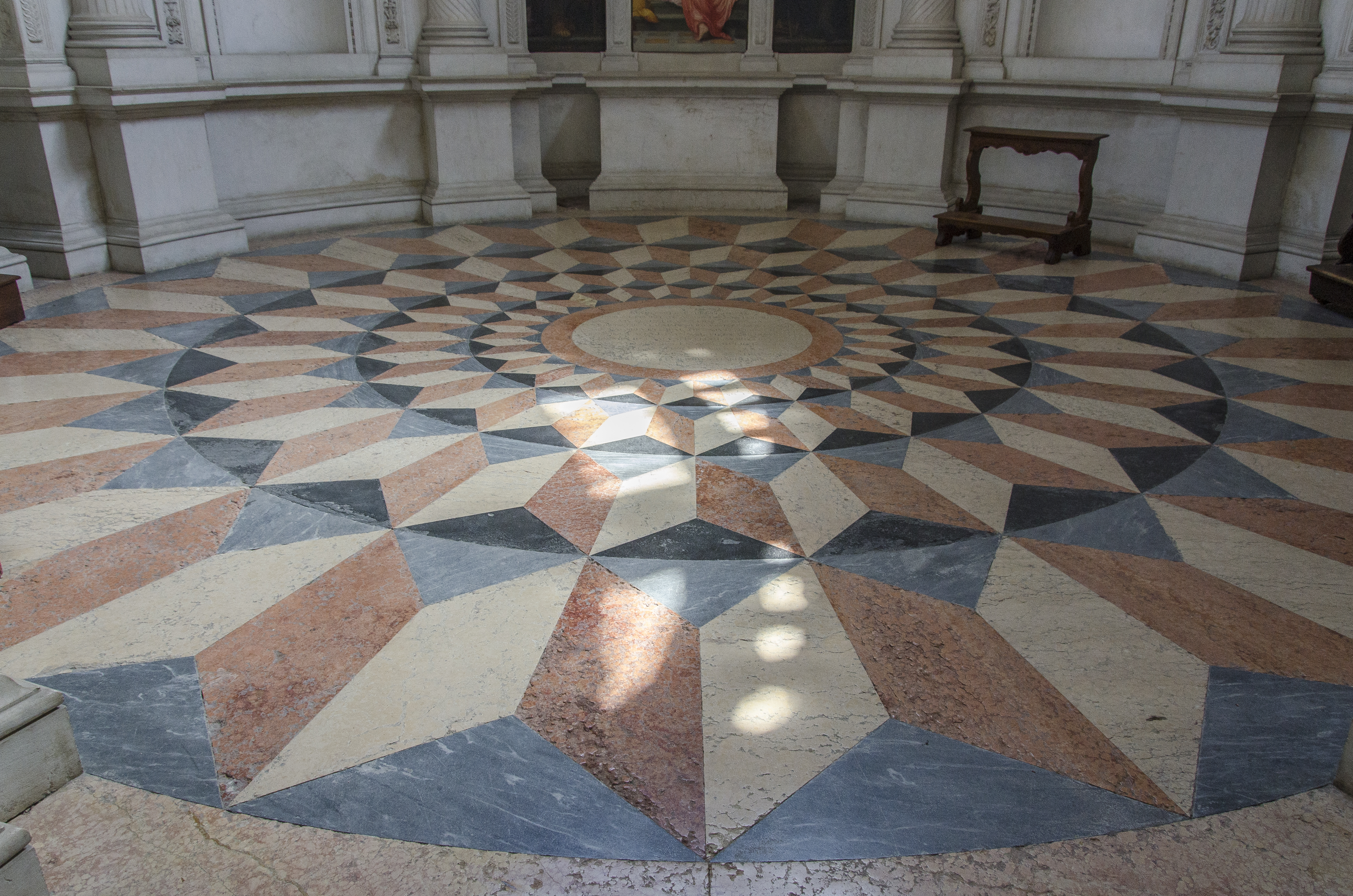
The paving of the monument

The first level, of Corinthian order, has four large aediculae surmounted by round arches, three of which are occupied by altars while one houses the wide entrance door; each aedicula is then set in a frame formed by a giant tabernacle composed of fluted half-columns above which the entablature with triangular pediment is set. The keystones of the arches bear the heraldic symbols of the Pellegrini family, a pilgrim, and of the Raimondi family, a crowned eagle, while on either side are carved female figures, angelic and allegorical representations of victory and Christian virtues. Interspersed with the tabernacles are empty niches that would have housed statues, decorated on the sides with candelabras carved in the lesenes, by shells in the basins and garlands at the base of the top entablature.

The first order is surmounted by a balcony with parapet, at the height of which begins the second, larger-diameter level, also of Corinthian order, which serves as the drum on which the dome is set; it is distinguished by the presence of four aediculae and four large tripartite windows with coupled columns that are located at the tabernacles of the lower level. A peculiarity, compared to the first order, is that only the columns and entablature are made of stone, while the rest is in lime plaster and marble dust, although the resulting surface has been bush-hammered and scraped as if it had been stone.

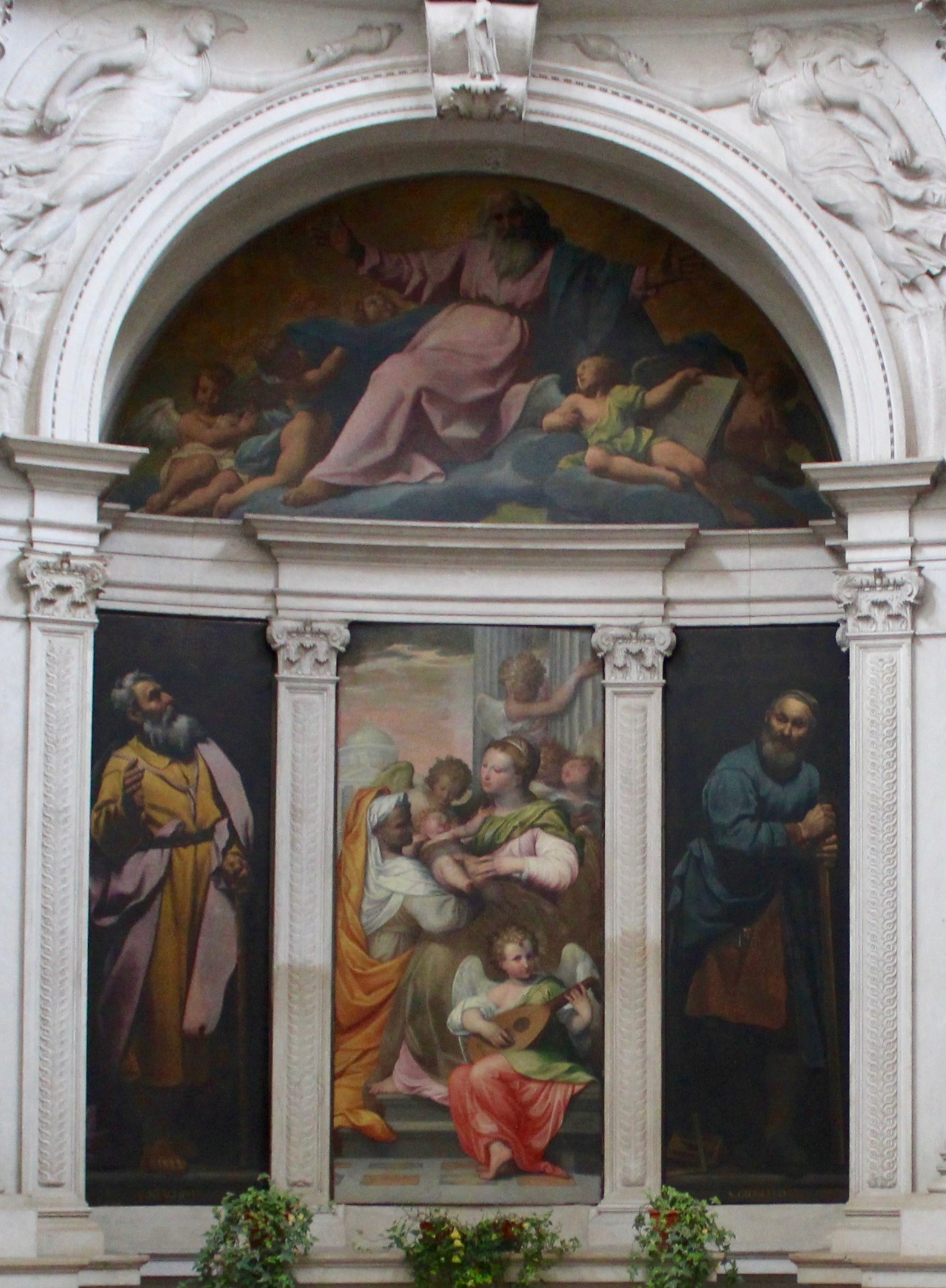
The altarpiece composed of paintings by Bernardino India (center) and Pasquale Ottini

The coffered dome with rosettes on a blue background, surmounted by a lantern, covers the chapel; the effect given by the color makes the interior space look majestic while the plasticity of the decorations is enhanced by the light that penetrates from the lantern and the stained-glass windows of the drum, giving the monument as a whole a striking elegance. The dome with drum, present here for the first time, became a Sanmichelian stylistic feature, as can be seen in the domes of the church of Madonna di Campagna, San Giorgio in Braida and the temple of Lazzaretto.

The chapel abounds with sculptural decorations whose elegance of execution finds few other examples in 16th-century architecture, and although the final result of the work turns out to be different from the initial plan drawn up by Sanmicheli, it recalls the style of the Veronese architect in many respects. The plan itself turns out to be very similar to that of the Petrucci chapel, built between 1516 and 1523 at the church of San Domenico in Orvieto.

On the chapel's high altar, in front of the entrance, there is a painting by Bernardino India from 1579 depicting the Madonna and Child with St. Anne; in the crescent a painting by Pasquale Ottini depicts the Eternal Father, while on either side of India's altarpiece there are two other paintings by Ottini depicting St. Joseph and St. Joachim. Ottini's paintings were probably made between 1619 and 1623. The building was intended to house other paintings, as evidenced by blank panels in the walls, which, however, were never made.

== See also ==
- San Bernardino, Verona
- Michele Sanmicheli
- Verona

== Bibliography ==
- Bisognin, Davide; Guastella, Giuseppe (2009). La chiesa di San Bernardino: visita guidata. Verona: Ottaviani.
- Brugnoli, Pierpaolo (1980). "Architettura sacra a Verona dal secolo XV al secolo XVIII". In Giorgio Borelli (ed.). Chiese e monasteri a Verona. Verona: Banca Popolare di Verona.
- Davis, Paul; Hemsoll, David (2004). Michele Sanmicheli. Milano: Mondadori Electa.
- Dianin, Gian Maria (1985). San Bernardino, Verona: guida storico-artistica. Verona: Banca Popolare di Verona.
- Giuliari, Bartolomeo (1816). Cappella della famiglia Pellegrini esistente nella Chiesa di San Bernardino di Verona. Verona: Tipografia Giuliari.
- Ronzani, Francesco; Luciolli, Gerolamo (1831). Le fabbriche civili, ecclesiastiche e militari di Michele Sanmicheli. Vol. II. Venezia: Giuseppe Antonelli.
- Vecchiato, Maristella, ed. (2010). Itinerari sanmicheliani nella provincia di Verona. Verona: MIBAC.
- Viviani, Giuseppe Franco, ed. (2002). Chiese di Verona. Verona: Società Cattolica di Assicurazioni.
- Breve notizia storica della chiesa di S. Bernardino di Verona dei P.P. minori osservanti di San Francesco. Verona: Tommasi. 1845.
