= Palazzo Pojana, Vicenza =

Coordinates: 45°32′51″N 11°32′42″E

UNESCO World Heritage Site
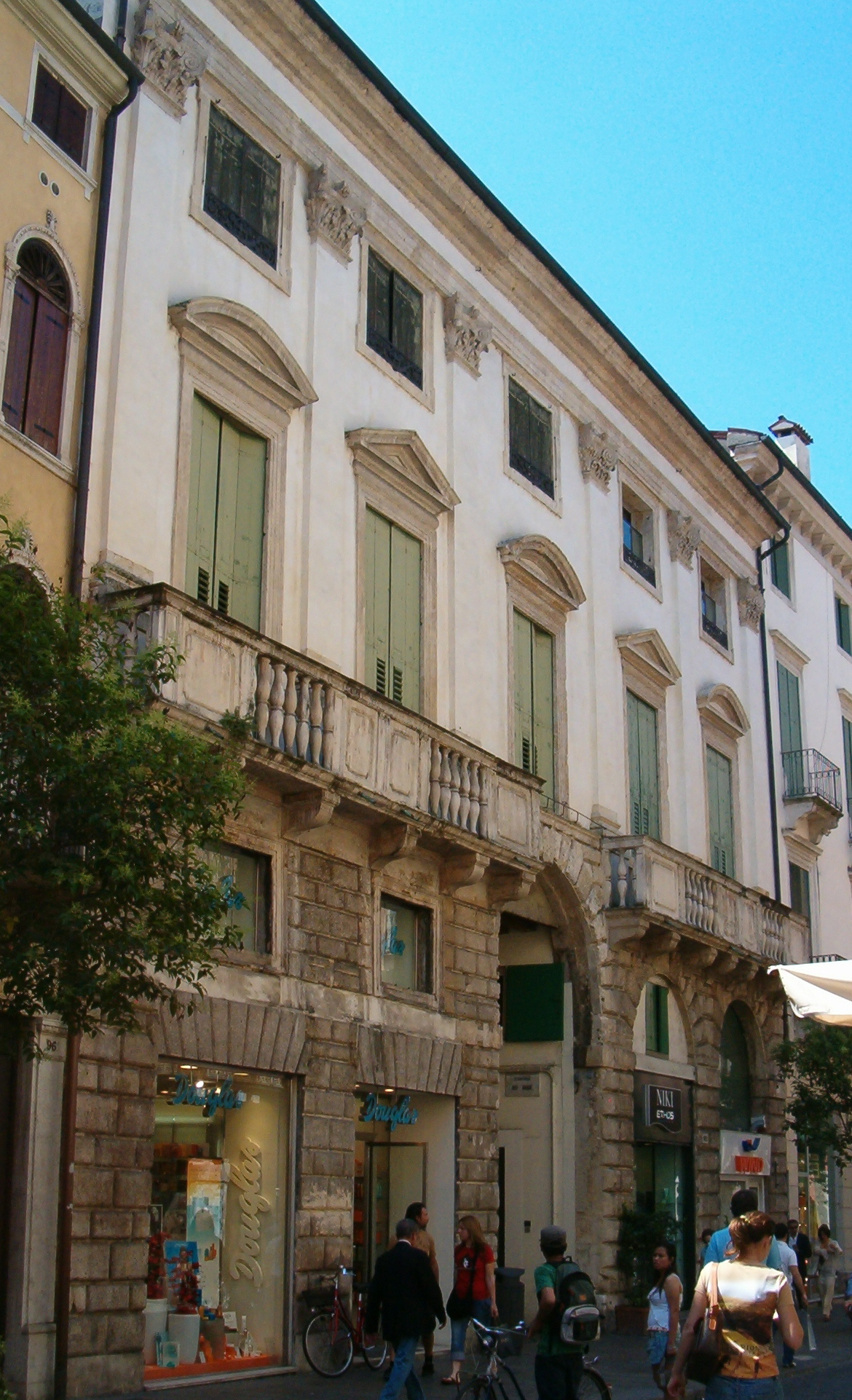

- Location within Veneto Location within Italy
- Location: Vicenza, Province of Vicenza, Veneto, Italy
- Part of: City of Vicenza and the Palladian Villas of the Veneto
- Criteria: Cultural: (i)(ii)
- Reference: 712bis-001
- Inscription: 1994 (18th Session)
- Extensions: 1996

Palazzo Pojana (also written Poiana) is a patrician palace in Vicenza, northern Italy, attributed to the Italian Renaissance architect Andrea Palladio, about 1560.

== Architecture ==
The palace we see today was created from two buildings separated by the alley known as Do Rode (Due Ruote), probably in 1566, following upon a request by Vincenzo Pojana to the town of Vicenza in 1561.

The attribution to Palladio is founded neither on documentary evidence nor on autograph drawings, but rather on the evidence of the architectural quality of the articulation of the piano nobile, with its order which embraces two whole floors, not to mention the design of various details, like the very elegant and fleshy Composite capitals and the entablature.

However, elements such as the pilasters devoid of entasis (that is, the characteristic swelling which culminates at a third of the shaft’s height) conform so little with Palladio’s vocabulary in the 1560s, that one may hypothesize that the design of the left-hand portion of the palace was the product of a youthful project by Palladio, only later extended to include the neighbouring building during the 1560s, when Pojana decided to enlarge his own residence. This would also explain the differences in the configuration of the basement zone between the two halves of the building.

== See also ==
- Villa Pojana
