= Emanuele Dalla Torre =

Israeli physicist

- עמנואל דלה טורה
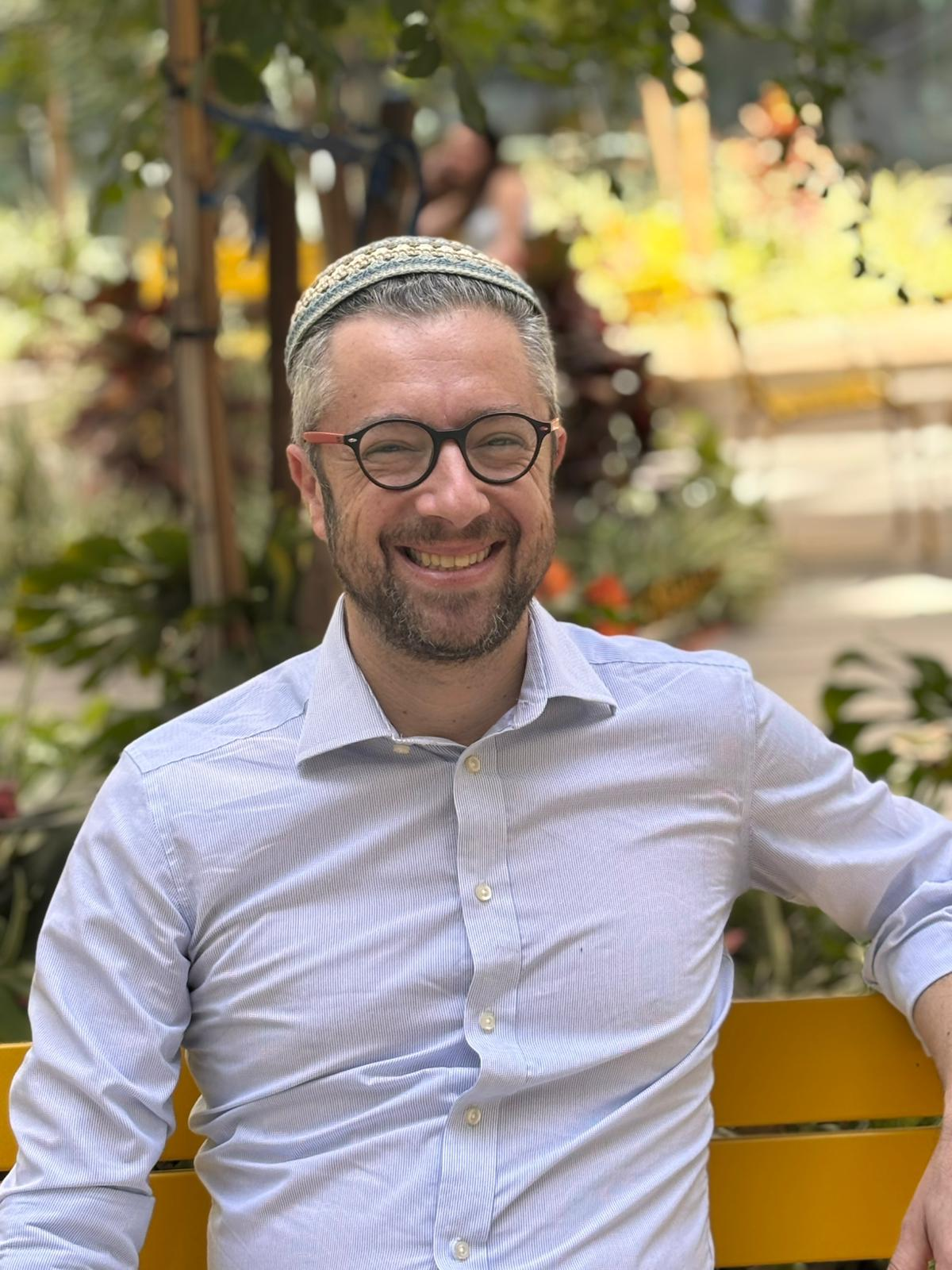
- Emanuele Dalla Torre in September 2025
- Born: September 19, 1980 (age 46); Milan, Italy
- Education: Technion – Israel Institute of Technology
- Occupation: Researcher
- Years active: 2013–present
- Known for: Physics research; international collaborations; entrepreneurship

Emanuele Dalla Torre (Hebrew: עמנואל דלה טורה; born September 19, 1980) is an Italian-Israeli physicist whose research focuses on condensed matter physics, quantum optics, and ultra-cold atomic systems. He received his PhD from the Weizmann Institute of Science in 2011. He is currently an associate professor at the Physics Department in Bar-Ilan University in Israel and a scientist of Quantymize, a startup in the field of quantum computing and quantum optimization. In the past, he worked as a postdoctorate fellow at the department of Physics of Harvard University in the US and spent a sabbatical year at Rigetti Computing. Dalla Torre said he values scientific international collaborations, especially between his two home nations, Italy and Israel. He is a vocal and influential opponent of the academic boycott against Israel.

== Research ==
Dalla Torre researches the field of quantum physics, particularly in the study of nonequilibrium quantum many-body systems. Some of his work delves into topological phases of matter, quantum phase transitions, and disorder and interactions in quantum systems. His study has found implications for recent experiments with superconducting materials and quantum simulators, such as ultracold atoms and quantum computers.

== Fellowships and prizes ==
- Technion Excellence Program for undergraduate students
- Adams Fellowship for doctoral students of the Israel Academy of Sciences and Humanities
- Rothschild Postdoctoral Fellowship of Yad Hanadiv
- ITAMP Postdoctoral Fellowship of the Harvard-Smithsonian Center for Astrophysics
- 2021 Rector Prize for Scientific Innovation at Bar-Ilan University
