= Eliodoro Forbicini =

Italian painter

Eliodoro Forbicini (born c. 1533), who flourished from 1550 to 1570, was a native of Verona, Republic of Venice, who excelled in grotesques. He decorated two rooms in the Palazzo Canova, which have been much admired.
