= Palazzo Dalla Torre =

Coordinates: 45°26′30″N 10°59′42″E

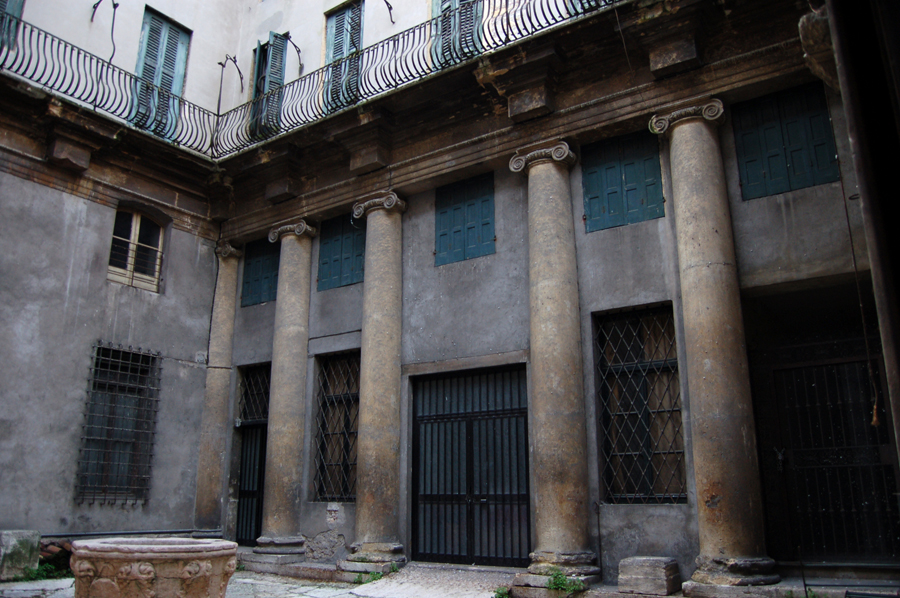
Courtyard with columns and entablature

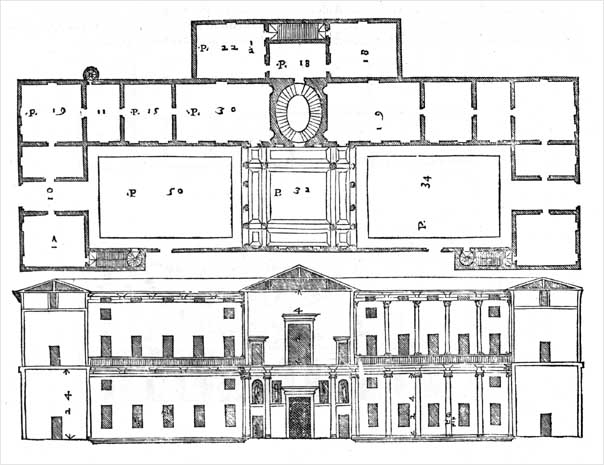
Palazzo Dalla Torre, floor plan and façade, from I quattro libri dell'architettura by Andrea Palladio, Venice 1570

Palazzo Dalla Torre is a patrician palace in Verona, northern Italy, designed by Italian Renaissance architect Andrea Palladio for Giambattista Dalla Torre. The palazzo was probably built from 1555, but remained unfinished. Allied bombardment in 1945 demolished a great part of the building. However, conspicuous remains of Palladio’s construction survive: the majestic access portal and a courtyard with columns and entablature.

== History ==
Palladio’s only work in the city of Verona, Palazzo Dalla Torre is somewhat of a mystery. If the dating is uncertain (the majority of scholars dates the beginning of construction to 1555), equally vague is our knowledge of the building’s actual form. This was only partially executed and can be reconstructed, therefore, only from the plate in the I quattro libri dell'architettura (1570), in this case particularly unfaithful.

== Patron ==
There are no doubts, however, about the identity of the patron, Giambattista Dalla Torre. Tied by familial bonds to the Vicentine Valmarana and Marcantonio Thiene (who commissioned his family palace from Palladio, Palazzo Thiene), he was a friend of intellectuals and artists; above all Giangiorgio Trissino, but also the great geographer Giambattista Ramusio, the doctor Giovanni Fracastoro and the architect Michele Sanmicheli.

== Sources ==
- T. Lenotti (1964). Palazzi di Verona. Verona: Vita veronese.
- F. Dal Forno (1973). Case e palazzi di Verona. Verona: Banca popolare di Verona.
- P. Floder Reitter (1997). Case palazzi e ville di Verona e provincia. Verona: I.E.T. edizioni.
- G. Forti (2000). La scena urbana: strade e palazzi di Verona e provincia. Verona: Athesis.
- M. Luciolli (2003). Passeggiando tra i palazzi di Verona. Garda.
