= Giulio Savorgnan =

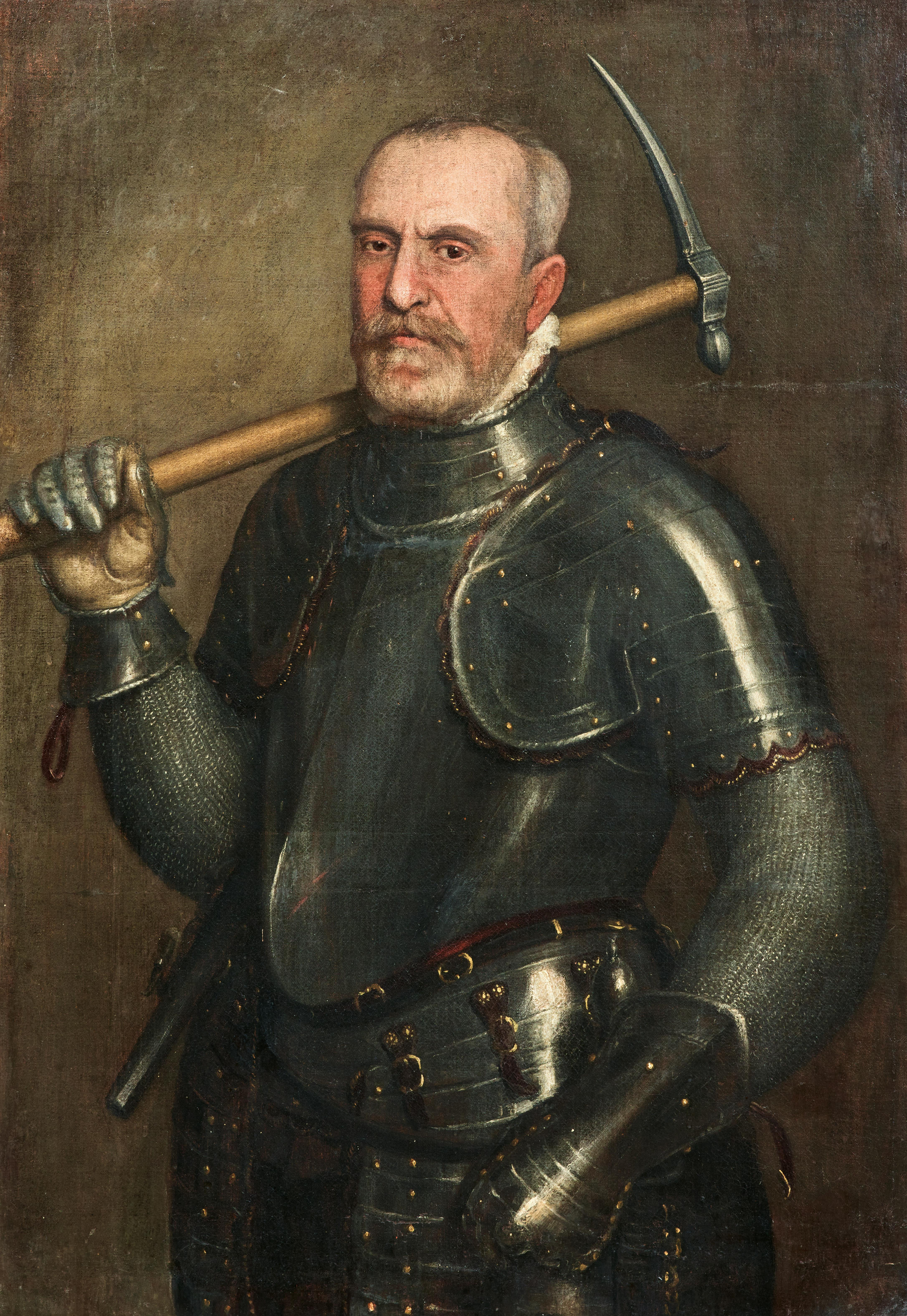
Portrait of Savorgnan attributed to Domenico Brusasorzi

Giulio Savorgnan (11 November 1510 – 15 July 1595) was a Friulian military engineer in the service of the Republic of Venice.

== Life ==
Savorgnan was born in Osoppo on 11 November 1510. He was the second son of Girolamo Savorgnan and the first of eleven children with his fourth wife, Orsina di Girolamo Canal. He had an older half-brother, Costantino. He spent his childhood between Osoppo in the Patria del Friuli and Venice. He was trained by private tutors in Latin and Greek, according to the letters of Marcantonio Amalteo. In 1527, with the approval of the Full College of Venice, Girolamo sent his son to the court of Marquis Federico II of Mantua. Although Savorgnan initially served as a page at court, his father soon requested that he bent sent to serve with the light cavalry to learn the art of war. In 1529, his father died. In 1534, his elder brother Costantino died and Giulio became the head of the Savorgnan fraterna.

Savorgnan's first military experience was in the Italian Wars in Lombardy, serving under Paolo Luzzasco, but he made his name in the overseas possessions of Venice's Stato da Màr during the Ottoman–Venetian wars. In 1539, he was sent to reinforce Kotor with 350 infantry. He served as military governor of Zadar for six years before he was sent to Corfu as superintendent of fortifications. In 1546, he organized the Dalmatian militia while serving as governor general of Venetian Dalmatia. In Crete, he worked on the fortifications of Candia. In 1567, he supervised the construction of the fortifications of Nicosia and of Famagusta on Cyprus. He was appointed governor general of Dalmatia again in 1569.

In 1571, Savorgnan was named general administrator of the Lidi and given command of the militia of the Lido. The landward defence of the Patria del Friuli was a major concern of his in these years, as letters of 1570 of 1583 attest. He advocated a revision to the Treaty of Worms that would cede Venetian territory east of the Isonzo to Austria in exchange for Austrian territory to the west. He spent most of the period 1572–1587 in Osoppo, where he was frequently visited by men of learning, such as Bonaiuto Lorini and Filippo Pigafetta, who dedicated his translation of Guidobaldo del Monte's Mechanicorum liber to Savorgnan in 1581. Pigafetta described the Savorgnan palace at Osoppo as "a warehouse of war machines" (un magazino di macchine bellicose). In 1573, Savorgnan inherited the fief of Ariis on the death of a childless cousin. He was a regular visitor in these years to the library of Giacomo Contarini in Venice. In 1574, when Contarini was in charge of preparing for the visit of King Henry III of France, it was Savorgnan who met the king through Friuli with a guard of 300 horse and 5,000 infantry.

In 1587, Savorgnan was named general superintendent of artillery and the Venetian fortresses of the Terraferma, namely, Verona, Bergamo, Peschiera and Palmanova. Construction on the new fortress at Palmanova began in October 1593. It was the last project in which Savorgnan took part. At the time of his death, he was gathering materials for a family history. His will is dated 25 May 1595. His universal heirs were Mario and Marcantonio, sons of his brother Marcantonio. He died in July. He was at first buried in the church of Santi Giovanni e Paolo in Venice and later reburied in Osoppo in a tomb he had prepared as early as 1577.

== Works ==
Several writings by Savorgnan have been published:

- Discorso circa la difesa del Friuli (1570), ed. Vincenzo Joppi (Udine: Seitz, 1869)
- Giulio Savorgnan a Varmilio di Varmo (1577), ed. Giovanni Battista di Varmo Sandaniele (Mortegliano: Commerciale, 1922)
- Lettera sui confini del Friuli scritta alla Signoria di Venezia il 1 settembre 1583, ed. Vincenzo Joppi (Udine: Seitz, 1872)
- Scrittura di Giulio Savorgnan nel 1592 sull'incanalamento del Ledra (Udine: Seitz, 1878)

There are also unpublished letters. A manuscript containing Savorgnan's reports from his time on Cyprus has recently been edited.

== Bibliography ==
- Casella, Laura (2016). "Savorgnan, Giulio". Dizionario biografico degli Friulani: Nuovo Liruti.
- Grivaud, Gilles (2016). Venice and the Defense of the Regno di Cipro: Giulio Savorgnan's Unpublished Cyprus Correspondence (1557–1570). Nicosia: Bank of Cyprus Cultural Foundation.
- Valerio, Flavia; Vidon, Alberto (2018). Giulio Savorgnan: Il gentiluomo del Rinascimento e le fortezze della Serenissima. Gaspari.
