= Domenico Riccio =

Italian painter (1516–1567)

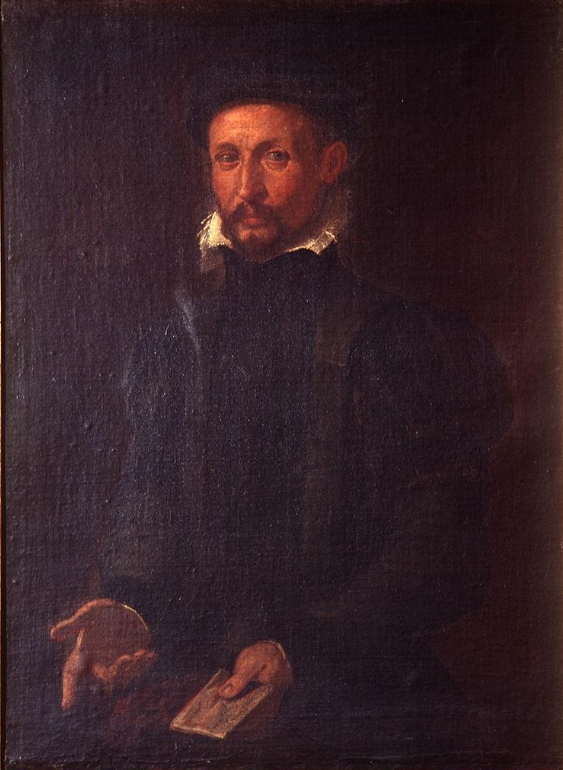
- Self-portrait, 1561
- Born: 1516; Verona, Republic of Venice
- Died: 1567 (aged 50–51); Verona, Republic of Venice
- Known for: Painting
- Movement: Mannerism

Domenico Riccio (also known as commonly known as Domenico Brusasorci; 1516 – 1567) was an Italian painter in a Mannerist style from Verona, best known for frescoes.

== Biography ==
Domenico Riccio was born in Verona in 1516. The name "Brusasorci," which means "rat burner," comes from his father, who acquired the name after becoming known for burning the rats in his house.

Riccio first apprenticed with his father. Later, he was reported to have trained with Giovanni Francesco Caroto and Niccolò Giolfino. He was a near contemporary of Antonio Badile. Brusasorci’s frescoes in the choir vault of S Stefano, Verona, painted after 1543, include a Battle of an Angel and a Demon that shows his appreciation of the sharply foreshortened figures in the choir vault of Verona Cathedral designed by Giulio Romano and executed by Torbido in 1534. The Virgin and Child Enthroned with Saints (Verona, Castelvecchio) and the fresco of Saint Ursula and the Virgins (Verona, Santa Trinità) include Parmigianinesque female figures.

His frescoes in the Municipio Vecchio (Palazzo Thun) at Trent date from 1551. In 1552 Brusasorci painted an altarpiece of Saint Margaret for Mantua Cathedral; Battista dell’Angolo del Moro, Paolo Farinati and Paolo Veronese were commissioned to paint for the cathedral at the same time; artists were evidently selected for their modernity, and Brusasorci’s Saint Margaret, with her precarious pose and elongated proportions, is an elegant statement of Mannerism. Among Brusasorci’s finest works are the fresco decorations of the Palazzo Fiorio della Seta (later Murari), Verona; the frieze of nymphs in terra verde from the façade that faced the River Adige survives (Verona, Castelvecchio). The graceful figures suggest a date in the early 1550s, close to the Saint Margaret.

The fresco decoration of 1567 in the Bishop’s Palace, Verona, features landscape views and portraits of the bishops of Verona. Brusasorci’s abilities as a landscape painter were already demonstrated in 1550 in the small panel paintings of landscapes with distant biblical scenes in the sacristy of Santa Maria in Organo, Verona. Brusasorzi prepared his paintings with drawings in pen and ink and modello drawings in chiaroscuro.

Brusasorci depicted the ceremonial Cavalcade of Charles V and Clement VII in the Palazzo Ridolfi-Dalisca. He painted a Madonna in glory and two saints for San Pietro Martire in Verona in 1566. A notable work of his is the dramatic fresco of Phaeton on the ceiling of the Palazzo Chiericati. Riccio died in Verona in 1567. His pupils were his son Felice, Giovanni Battista Zelotti, Bernardino India, and Paolo Farinati. His son Felice painted for some years in Florence. Two other children were painters: Giovanni Battista and Cecilia Brusasorci.

== Gallery ==
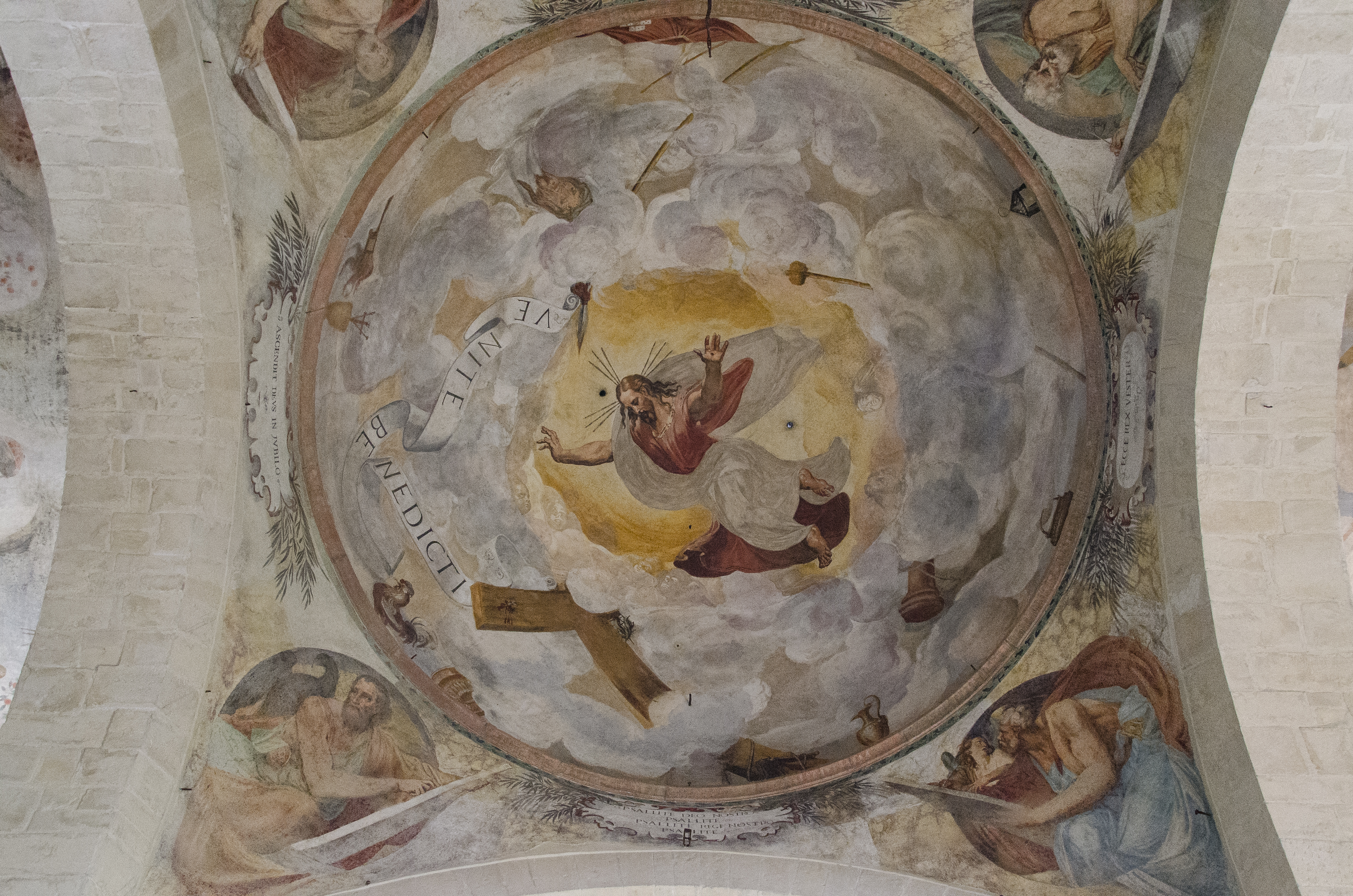
Christ in Glory, Santo Stefano, Verona

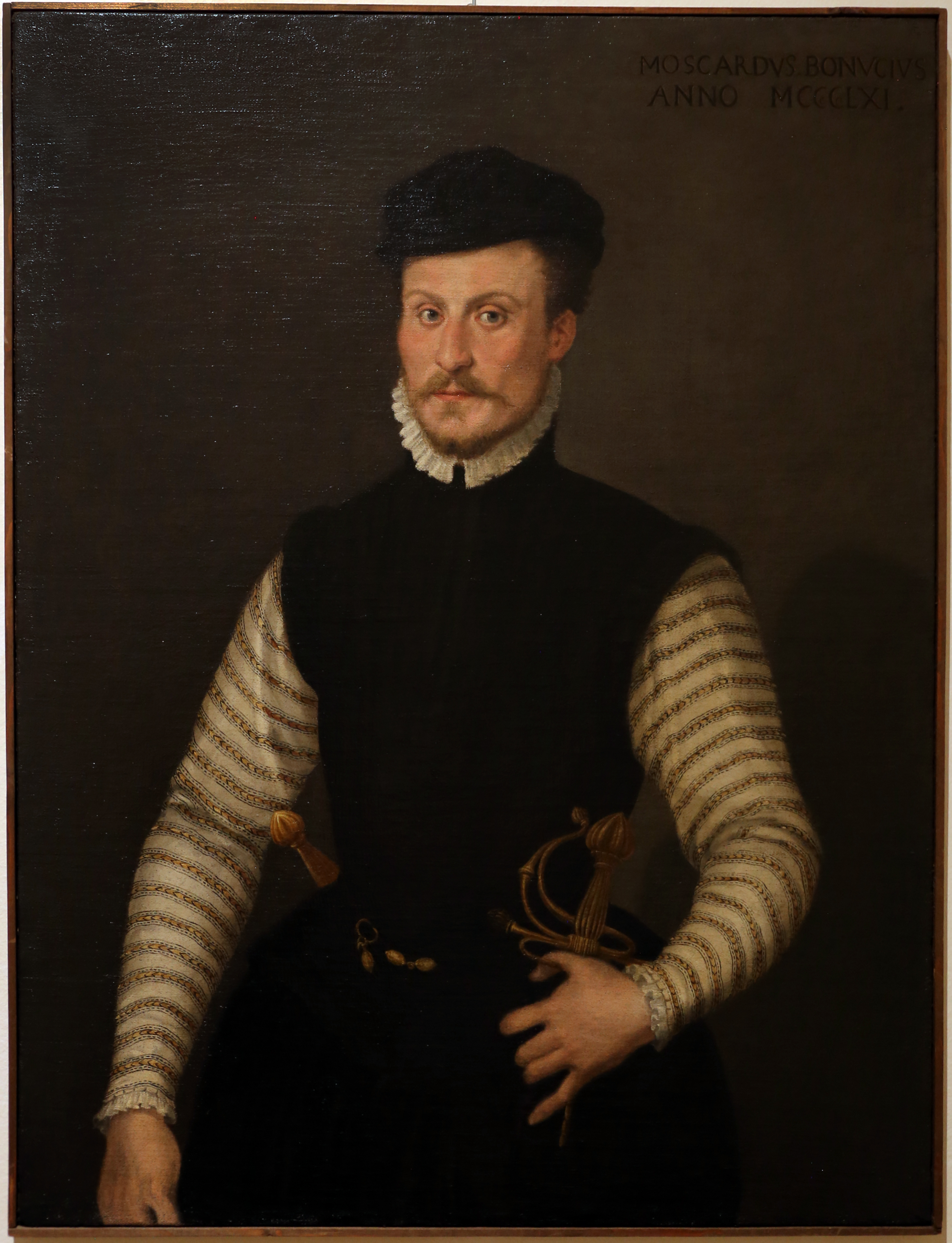
Portrait of Bonucio Moscardo, Castelvecchio Museum, Verona

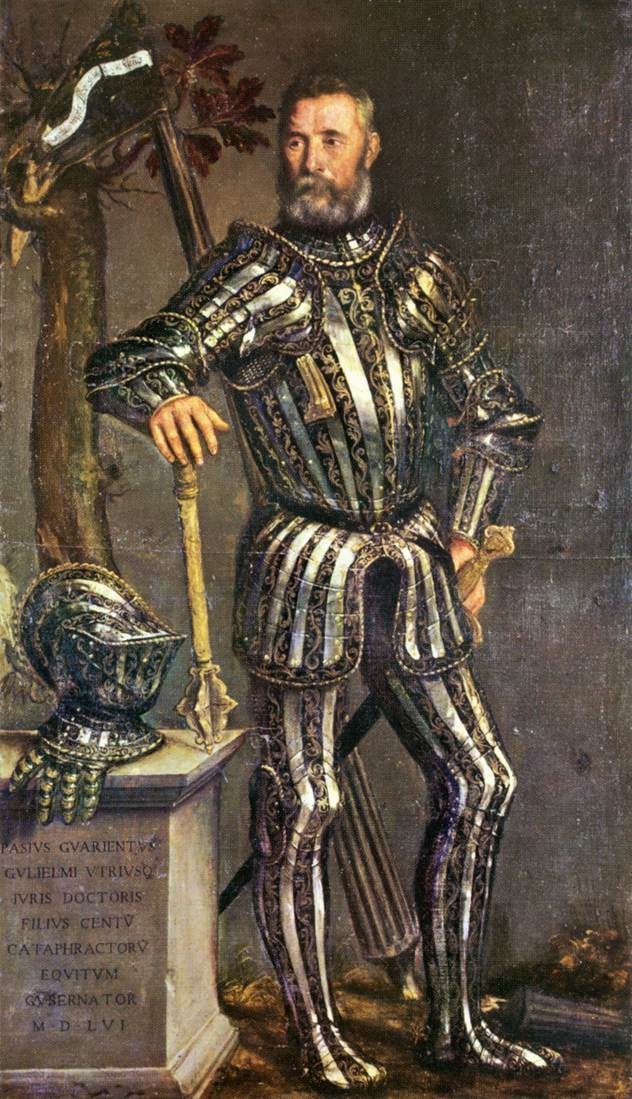
Portrait of Pase Guarienti, Castelvecchio Museum, Verona

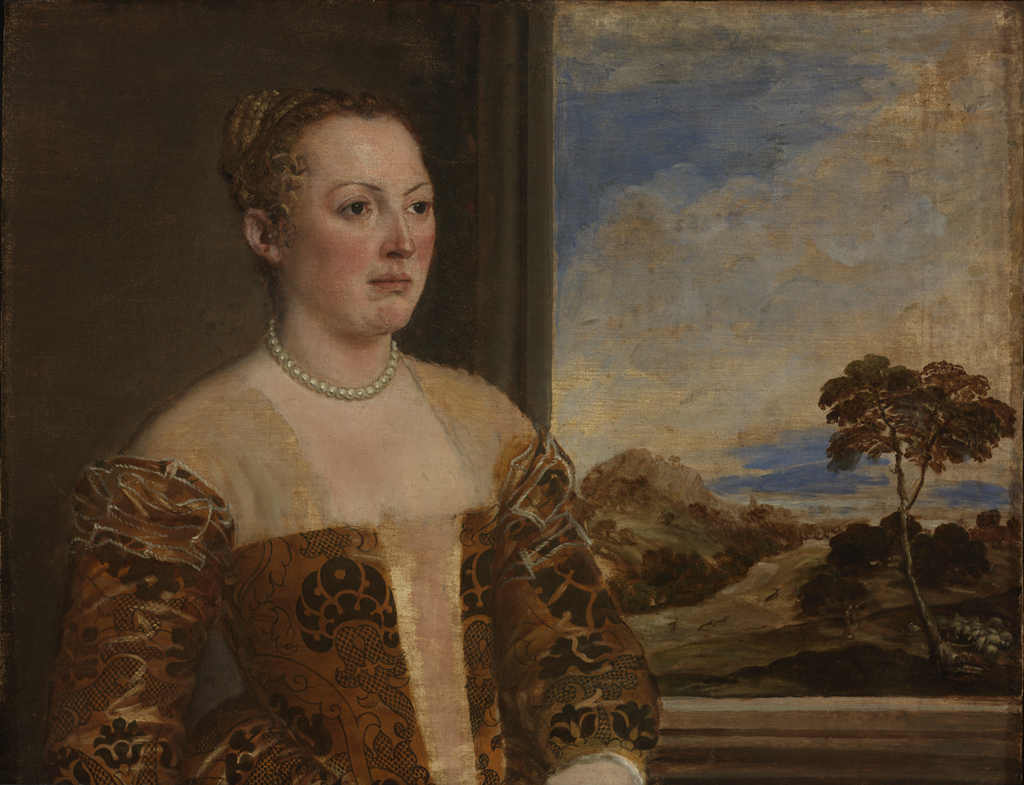
Portrait of a Woman, Rhode Island School of Design Museum

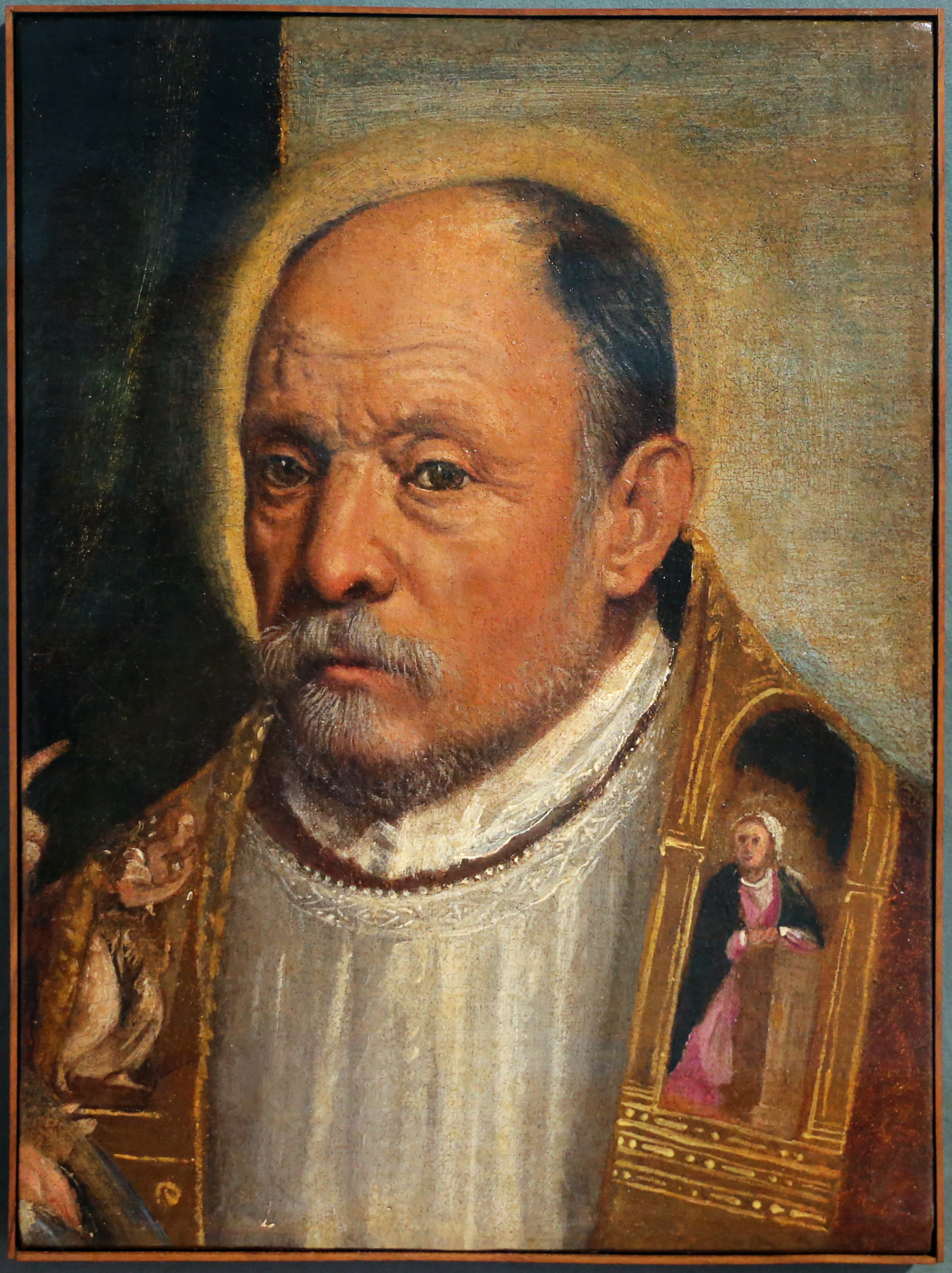
Portrait of a priest, Castelvecchio Museum, Verona

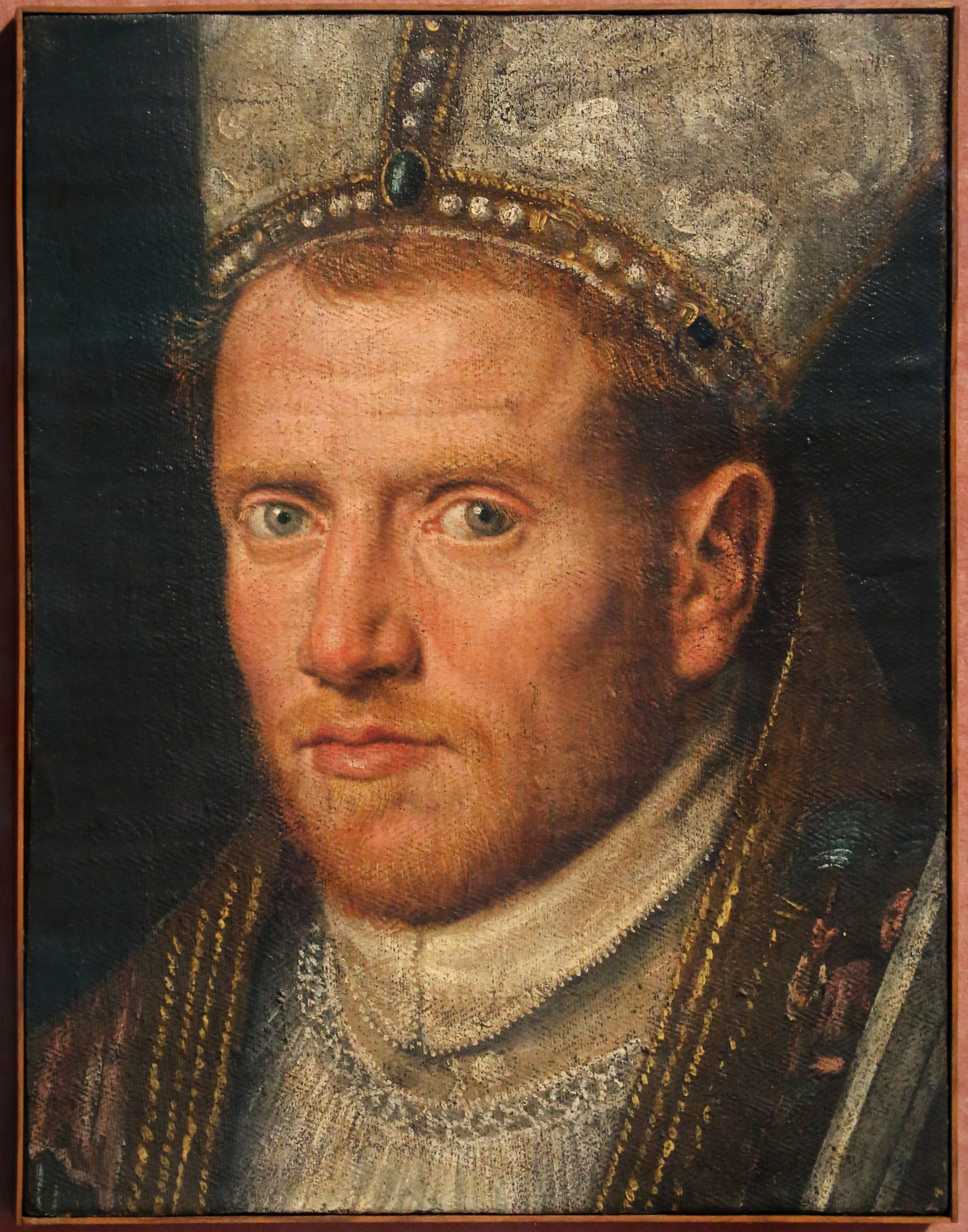
Portrait of a bishop, Castelvecchio Museum, Verona

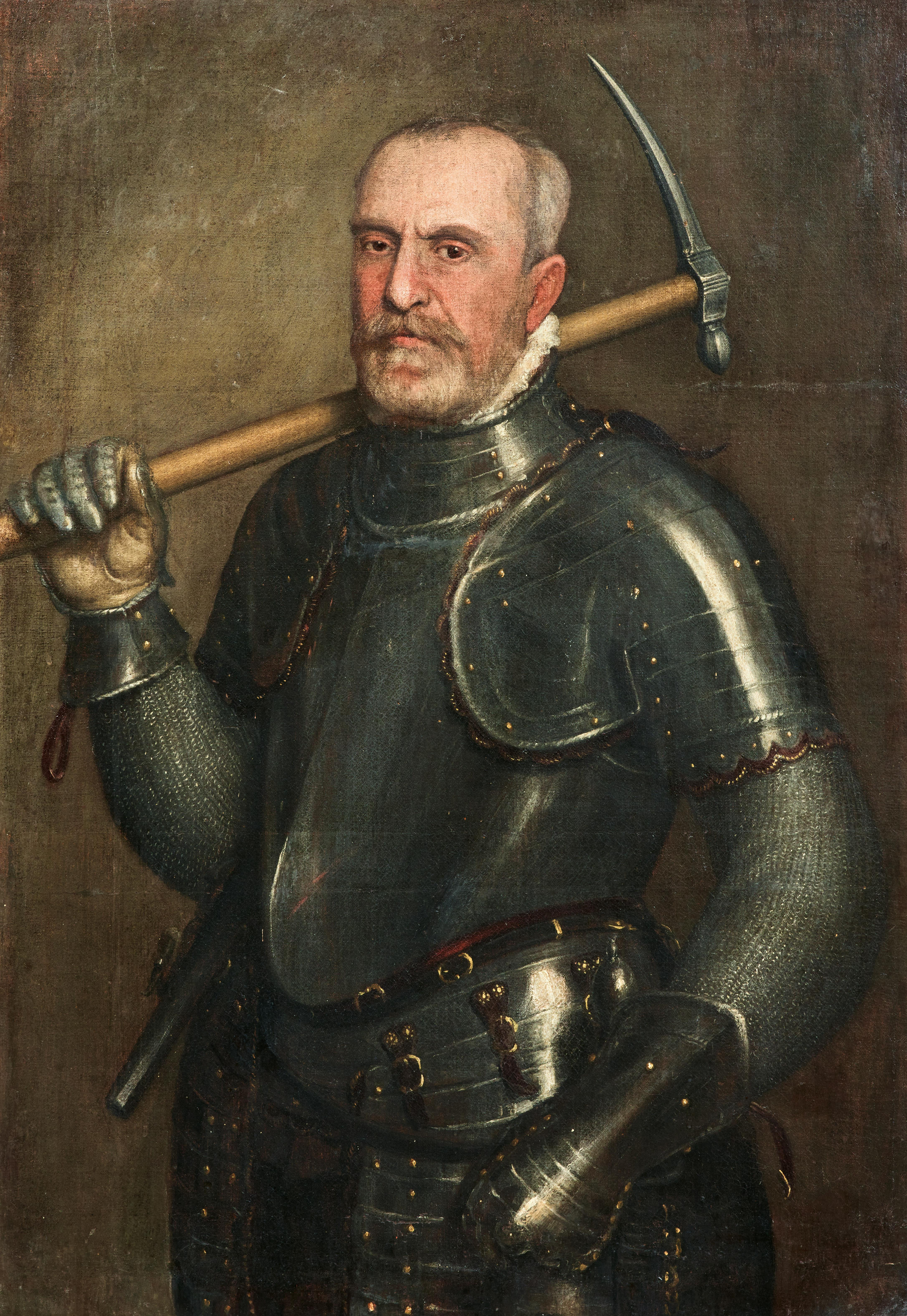
Portrait of Giulio Savorgnan with a pickaxe, oil on canvas, priv. col.

== Bibliography ==
- Freedberg, Sydney J. (1993). Painting in Italy, 1500-1600. Pelican History of Art. Penguin Books Ltd. pp. 563–4.
