= Palazzo Ridolfi-Dalisca, Verona =

Coordinates: 45.4342°N 10.9944°E

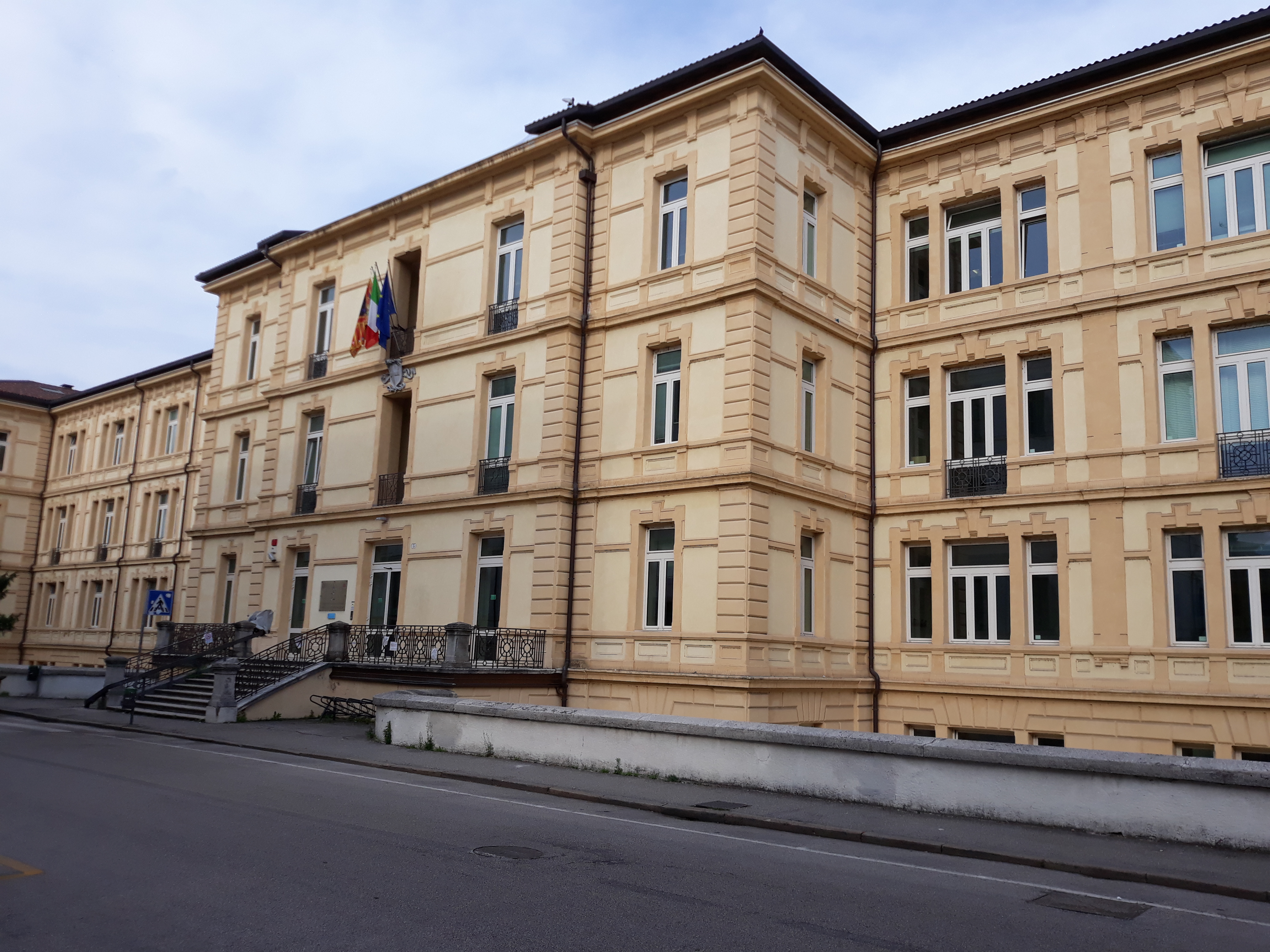
Istituto Messedaglia

Palazzo Ridolfi-Dalisca is a historical palace located on Via Bertoni in Verona, northern Italy; since 1952, it has housed the Liceo Scientifico Statale "Angelo Messedaglia".

== History ==
Construction of the palace began in 1545, but completion of the structure is attributed to Bernardino Brugnoli, (1538–1585), nephew of Michele Sammicheli. Over the next centuries further reconstruction Commissioned by the Da Lisca family added a Piano Nobile. The palace was severely damaged during the war on February 23, 1945, although the central salon, frescoed by Domenico Riccio (il Brusasorzi) was spared. The palace is now owned by the Province of Verona, which in 1952 granted it to the Liceo Scientifico Statale “Angelo Messedaglia”. The entry portal has a bas-relief added in the 19th century depicting the Rape of Europe. One of the rooms destroyed in the war, was decorated with 15th-century ceiling paintings from a nearby house, depicting the Cavalcade of Pope Clement VII. This event occurred on February 24, 1530 on the occasion of the coronation of Charles V, Holy Roman Emperor.
