= Orazio Farinati =

Italian painter

Orazio Farinati (c. 1559–1616) was a late Mannerist Italian painter.

Farinati was born in Verona. He was the principal assistant to his father, the painter Paolo Farinati, and worked in Paolo's studio until 1606. His style owes much to that of his father and sometimes even directly copies it. Orazio was also active in engraving his own work and that of other Veronese and Venetian masters.
