= Cecilia Brusasorzi =

Italian painter (1549-1593)

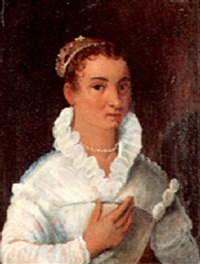
- A possible self-portrait of Cecilia Brusasorzi
- Born: 1549; Verona, Republic of Venice
- Died: 1593 (aged 43–44)
- Spouse: Giovanni da Arcole (died)
- Children: 2
- Father: Domenico Riccio
- Relatives: Felice Riccio (brother)

Cecilia Riccio (or Ricci; 1549 – 1593), known as Brusasorzi (or Brusazorzi/Brusasorci), was an Italian painter based in Verona. She was active in the workshop of her father, Domenico Riccio.

== Biography ==
Cecilia Riccio was born into the Brusasorzi family in Verona, Republic of Venice (present-day Italy) in 1549. Her parents were Domenico and Toscana Riccio. Like her brothers Felice and Giambattista, Cecilia was a pupil and collaborator of her painter father.

According to her will, dated April 2, 1593, she had been married to Giovanni da Arcole, who resided in Verona's San Zeno district. After being widowed, she and her children, Girolamo and Drusilla, returned to live with her brother Felice in the Beverara area.

== Art ==
Cecilia worked in her family's art workshop, where she specialized in portraiture, producing works "of beautiful grace and sweet manner," as Bartolomeo Dal Pozzo wrote in 1718. She was recognized as "emulating nature in breathing the breath of life into the papers and canvases that she colors."

Modern critics, however, highlight her technical abilities as a painter but do not note a great artistic quality.

No works can be attributed to her with certainty. According to Dal Pozzo, she created a portrait on copper for a member of the Calderari family in Vicenza, who in turn dedicated a sonnet to her, which was visible on the back on the portrait. However, this piece has not been located. A painting depicting several female saints, preserved at the municipal gallery of Verona, is also attributed to her.

Cecilia was also active in working on illuminated manuscripts as a miniaturist.
