= Fraterna =

In the Republic of Venice, a fraterna (plural fraterne) was a company of brothers that agreed not to divide their patrimony but to own and manage it collectively. A fraterna continued between cousins, second cousins and so on until it was divided. The fraterne originally "derived their existence from the physical fact that brothers often lived together in the same house" and operated the family business jointly. Fraterne for the purposes of commercial investment can be traced back to the 12th century. The study of fraterne in general is made difficult by the fact that they generally come into view clearly only with their dissolution by a judge (giudice del proprio).
