= Alps2Adria =

Cycle route in Austria and Italy

The Alpe Adria bicycle track (also Ciclovia Alpe Adria Cycle Route or Italian Ciclovia Alpe Adria) is a 415 km Long-distance cycling route between Salzburg (Austria) across the Alps to Grado (Italy) on the Adriatic Sea. It integrates also former railway tracks and numerous tunnels. Cycling from Salzburg to Grado, the total climb is 5410 m and the total descent 5804 m.

Since the high Alpine passes are bridged by train through the Tauernschleuse and are thus no longer necessary, the cycle route has been a popular Transalpine route since its opening in 2012, as it is not too technically or physically demanding. The best months for cycling are June, July, and September; in August, it can be very hot, especially in Friuli. A large part of the route runs along cycle paths. However, especially in Austria, the route also runs along busy federal highways without any cycling infrastructure (e.g., after the Lueg Pass towards Werfen). Not all sections are paved and suitable for road bikes. The signage is generally good and consistent.

Many travel guides and reports describe or cycle the entire Alpe Adria Cycle Route in six to eight day stages. Fit cyclists can complete the route in just three days. Most of the areas cycled through are well-developed for tourism, so dividing the stages into individual sections is usually not a problem.

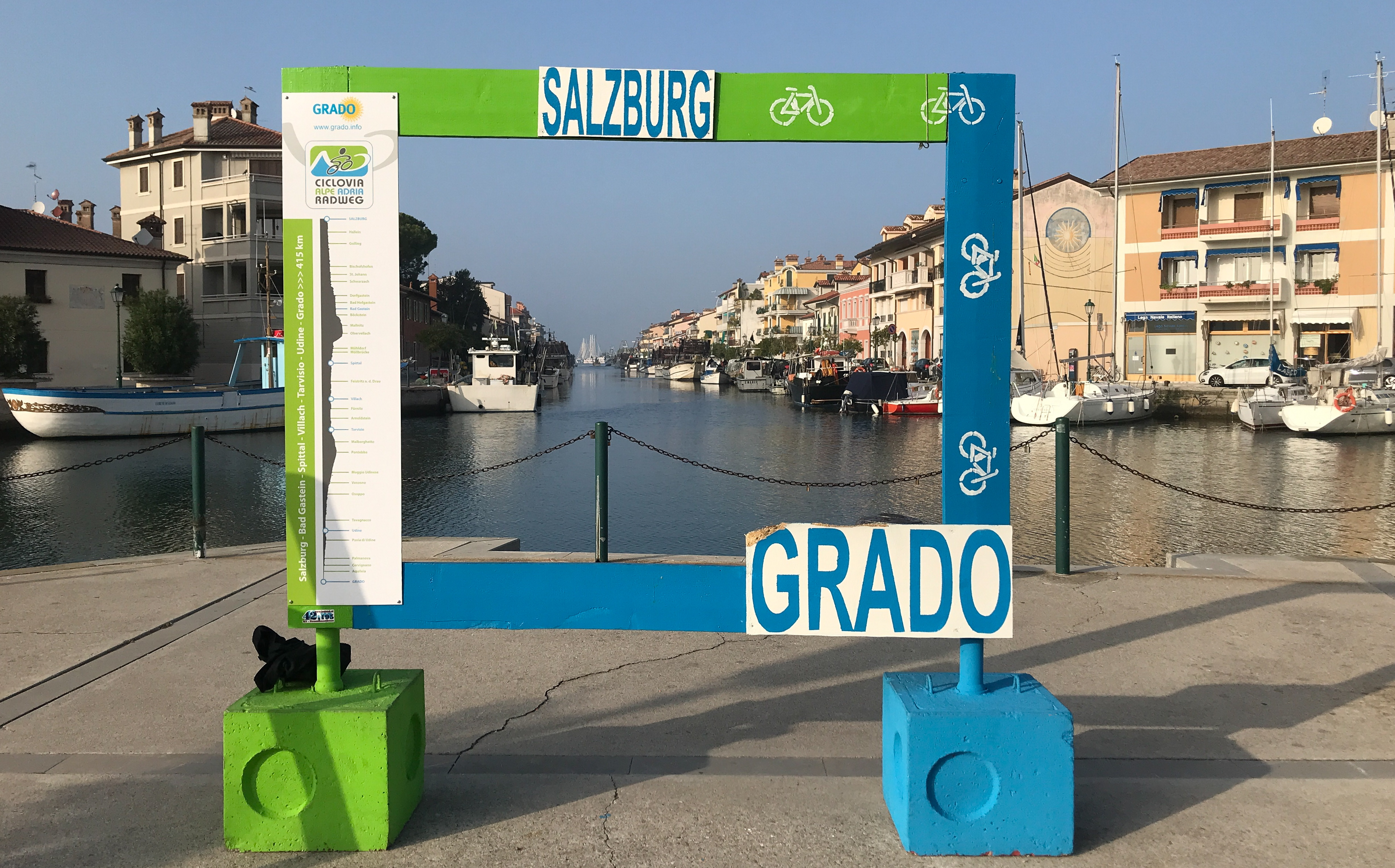

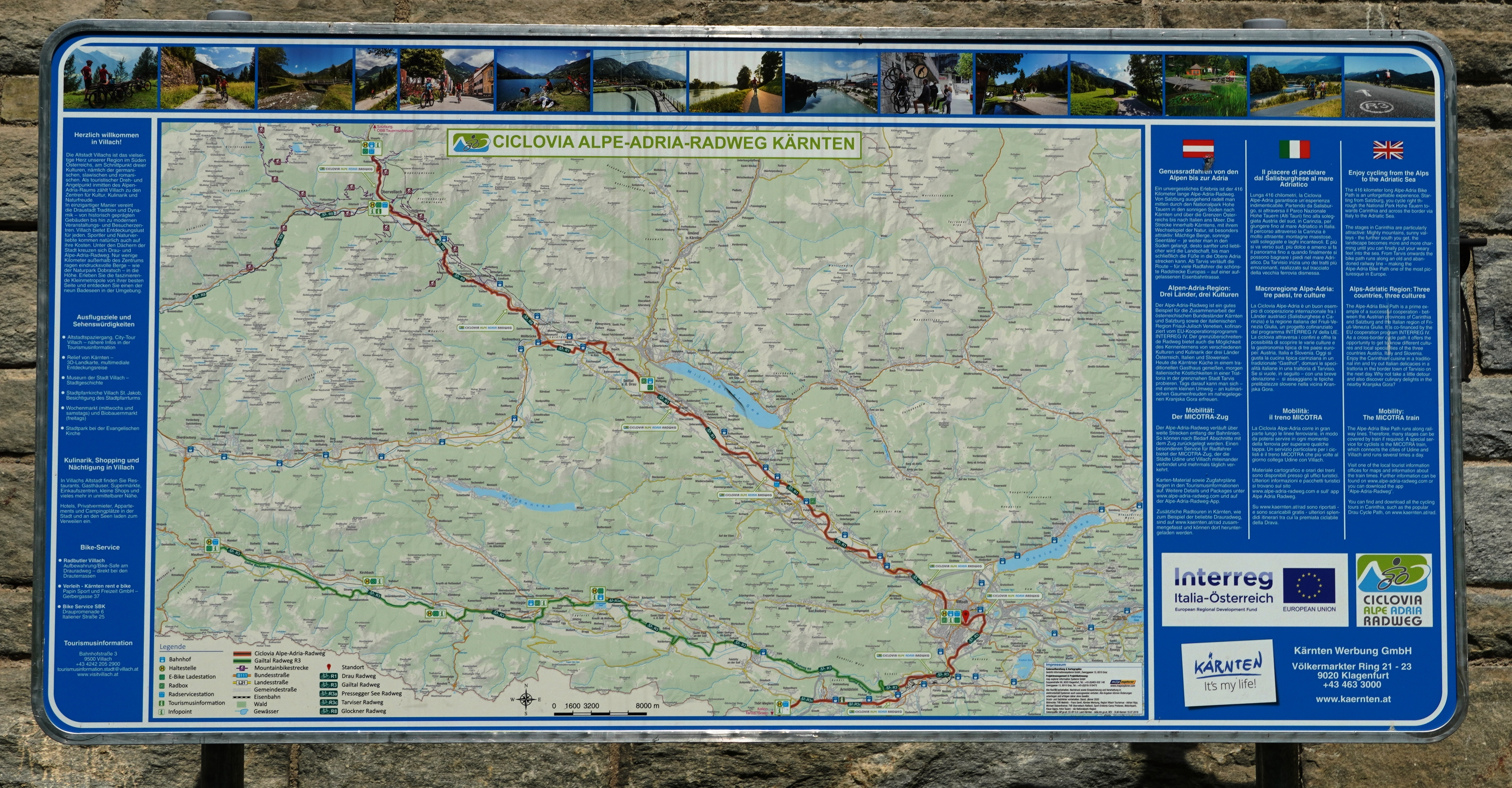
information board

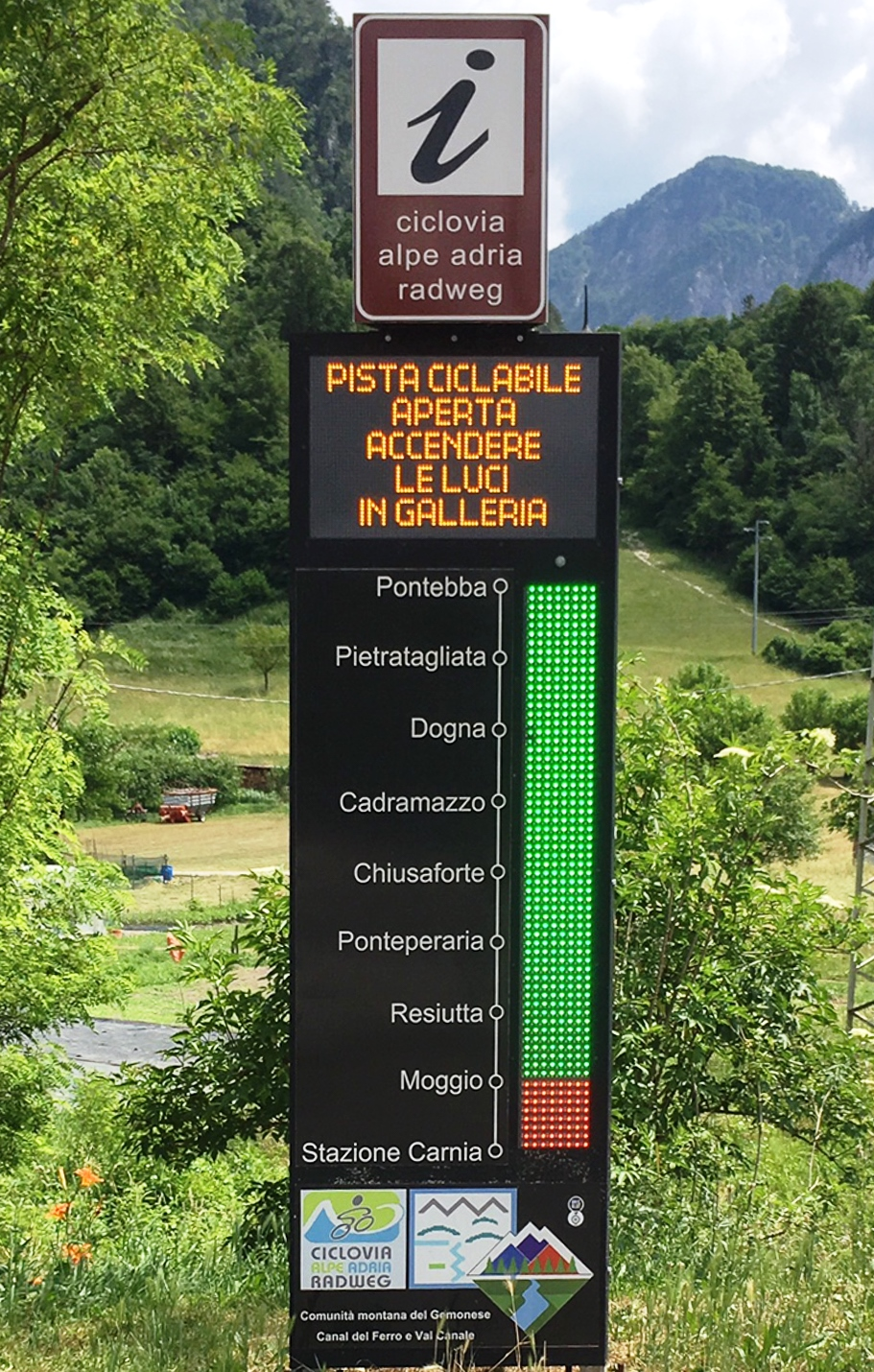
Ciclovia Val Canale (IT, near Tarvisio)

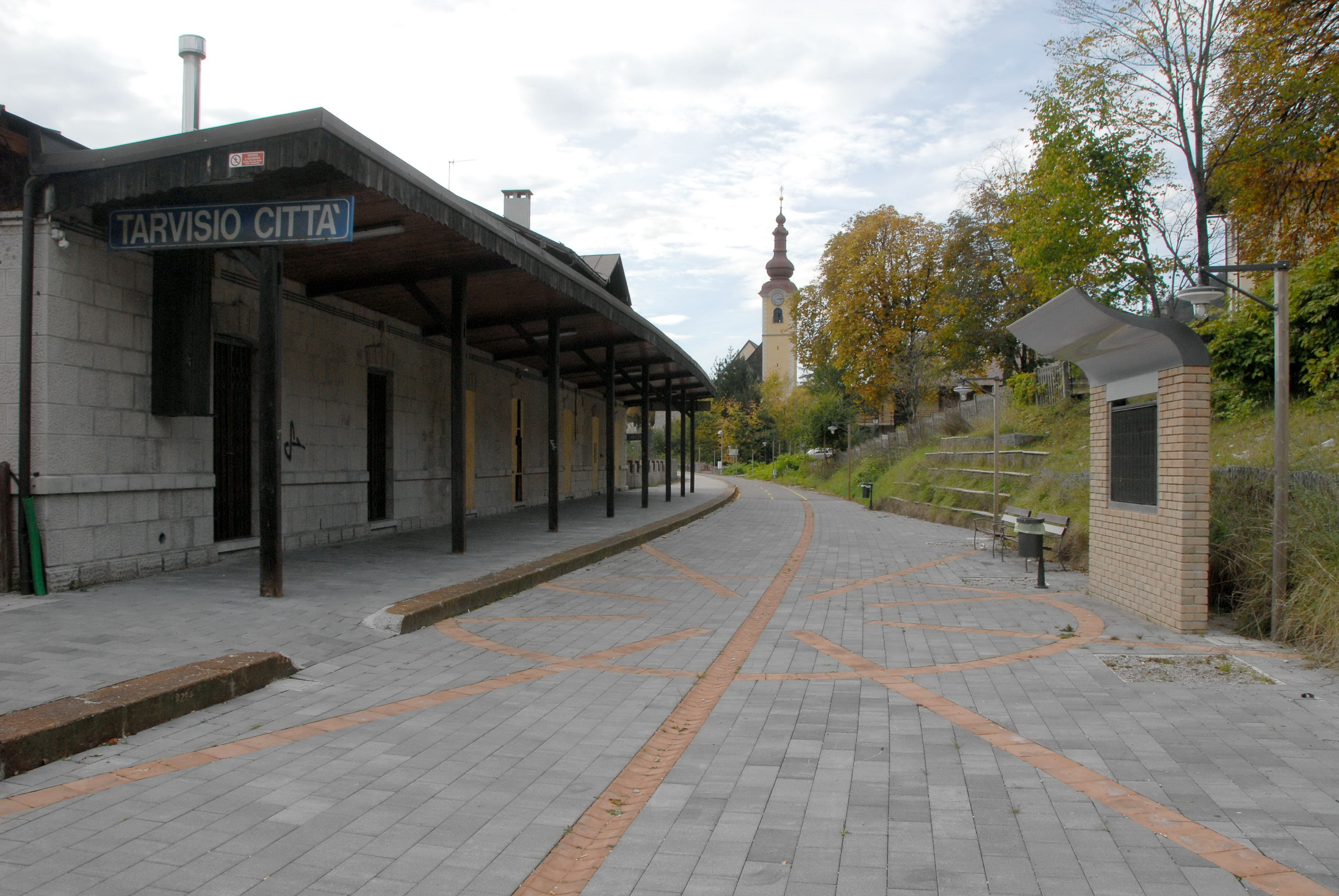
old railway station in Tarvisio

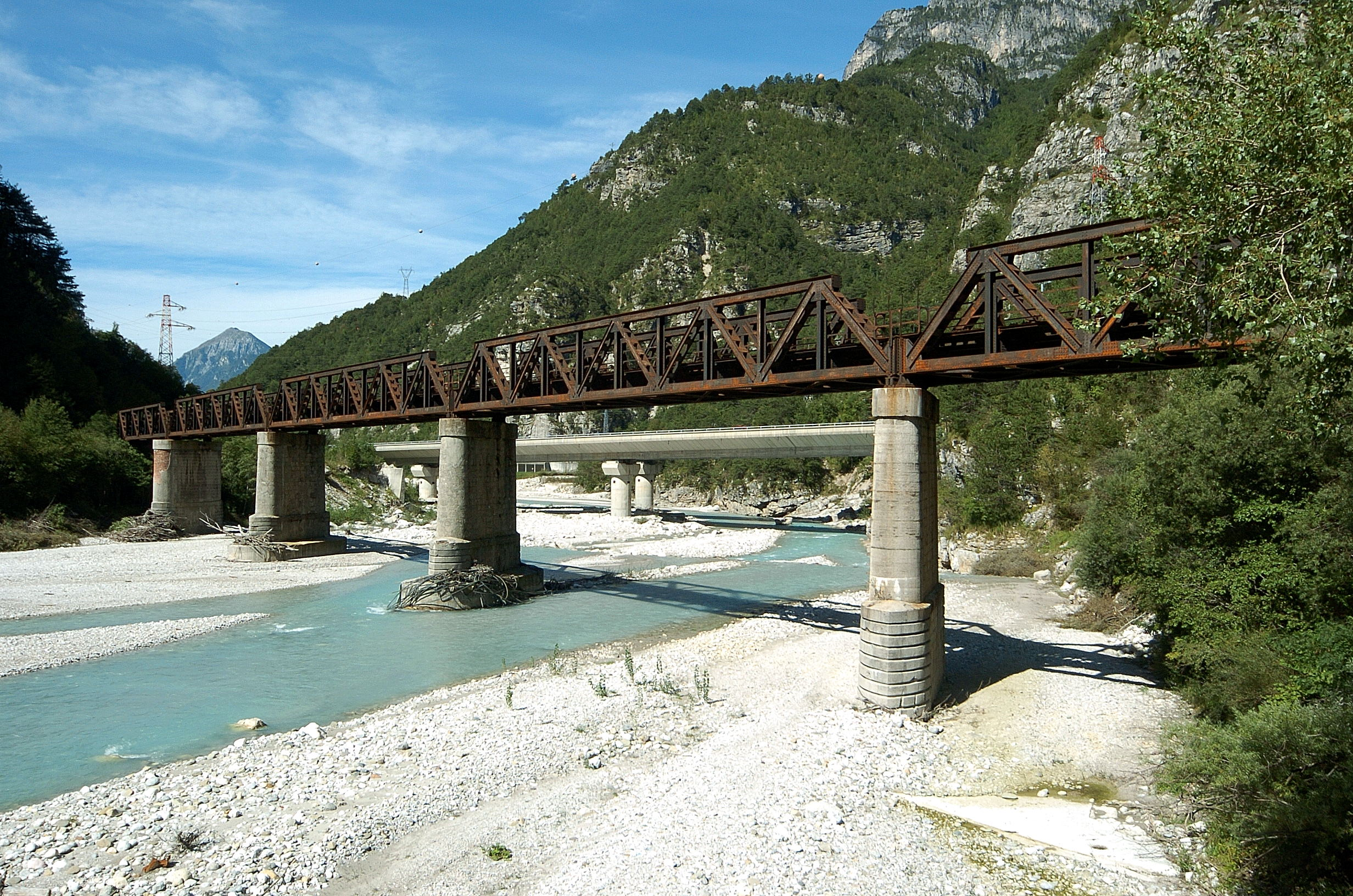
Railroad bridge old Pontebbana across river Fella (Chiusaforte)
