= Francesco Montemezzano =

Italian painter

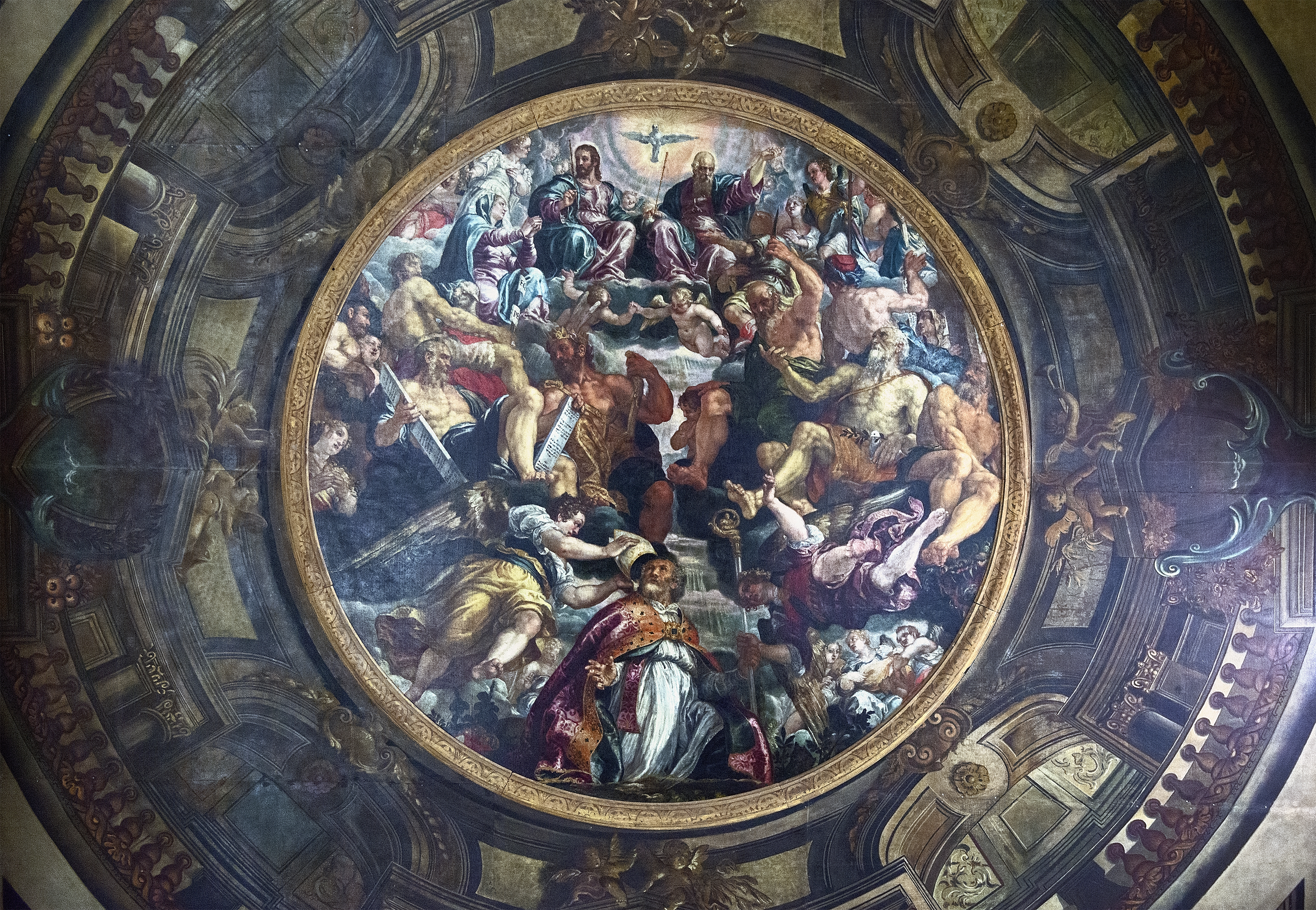
Ceiling of San Nicolò dei Mendicoli, Venice

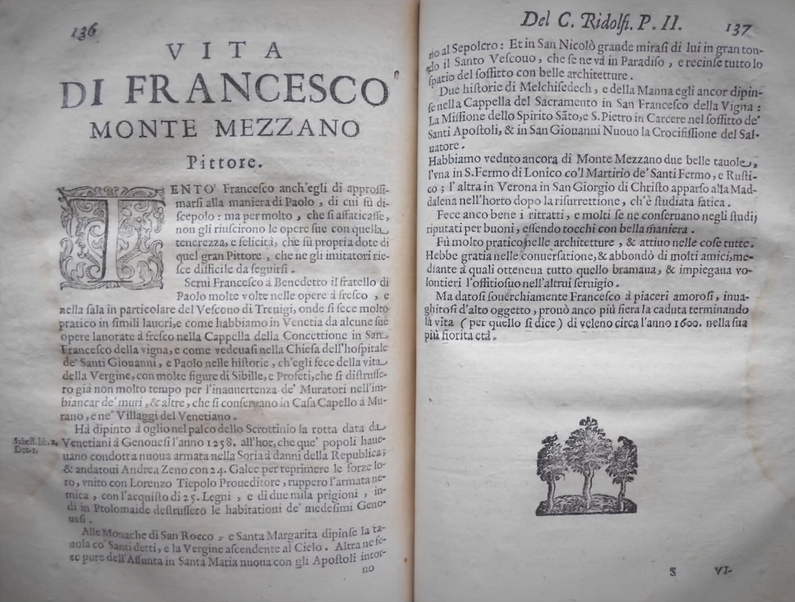
Biography of Francesco Montemezzano by Ridolfi

Francesco Montemezzano or Monte Mezzano (Verona, 1555 – after 1602) was an Italian painter of the late-Renaissance or Mannerist period.

== Life and career ==
He was born near Verona, and appears to have been a follower, if not a pupil, of Paolo Veronese. He was active both in Venice and the mainland, painting mainly sacred subjects.

He completed some of the panels for the church of San Nicolò dei Mendicoli in the Venetian district of Dorsoduro. Ridolfi in a short biography notes that Francesco gave himself excessively to the pleasures of love, fell in love with expensive objects and this led to an early death by poisoning.

== In media ==
He was featured in an episode of the BBC One television programme Fake or Fortune? that aired on 19 July 2015 (Series 4, Episode 3), in which a large painting of the Lamentation of Christ at an English church (St John the Baptist Church in Tunstall, Lancashire) was investigated and verified as being by the artist.

== Gallery ==
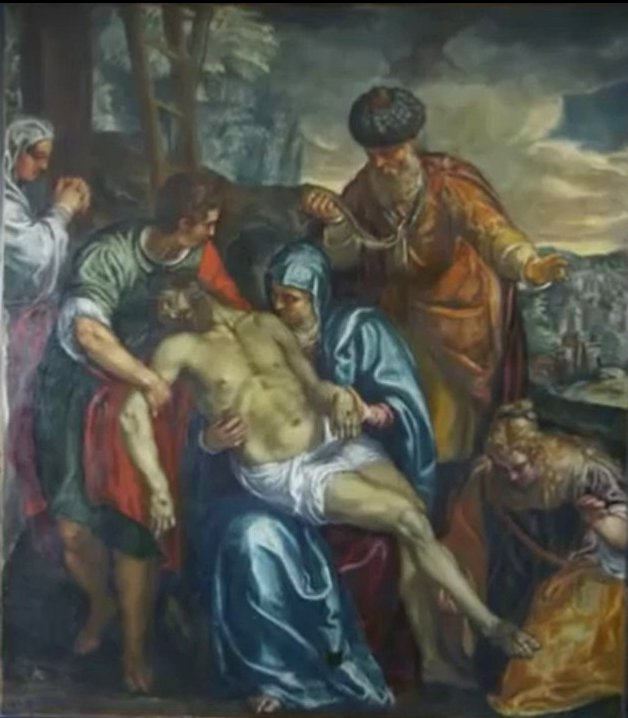
The painting featured on Fake or Fortune?

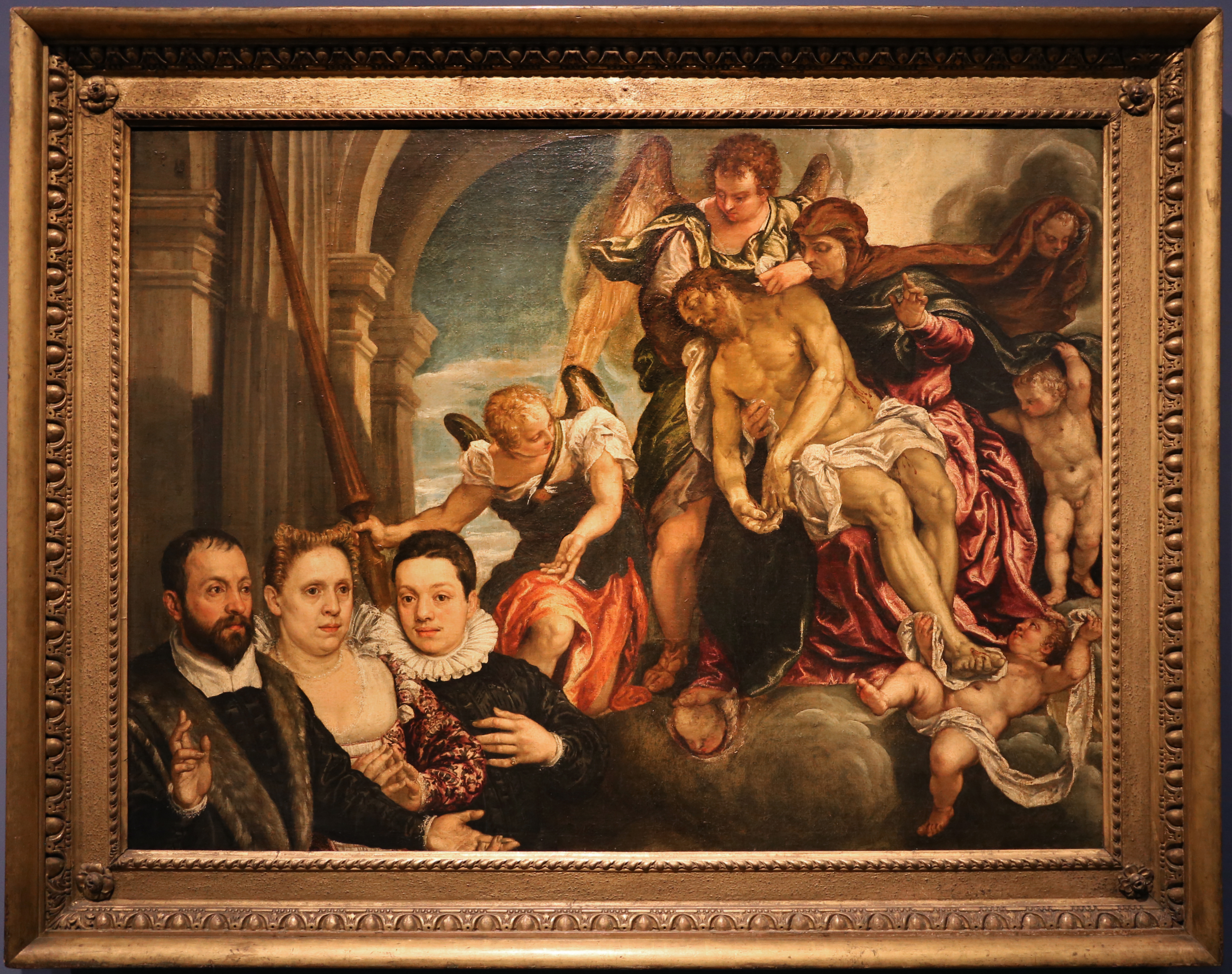
Pietà con committentia

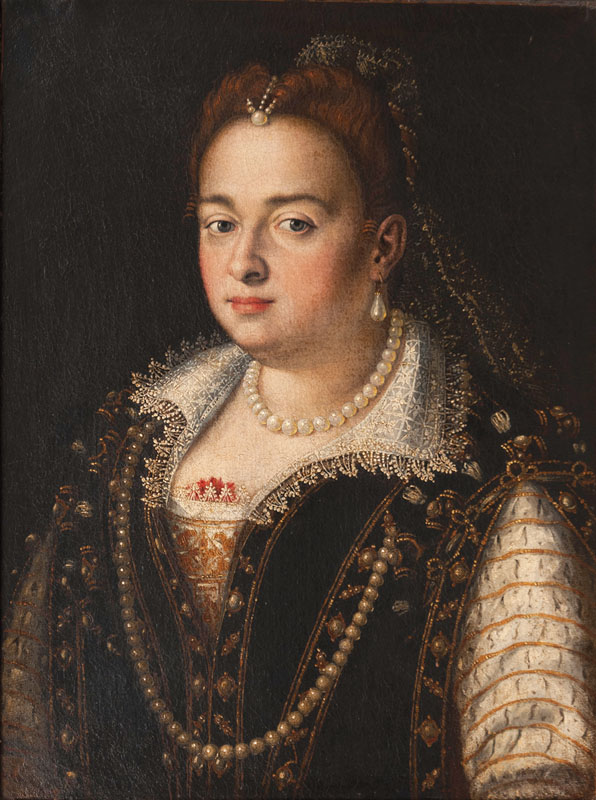
Portrait of Bianca Cappello

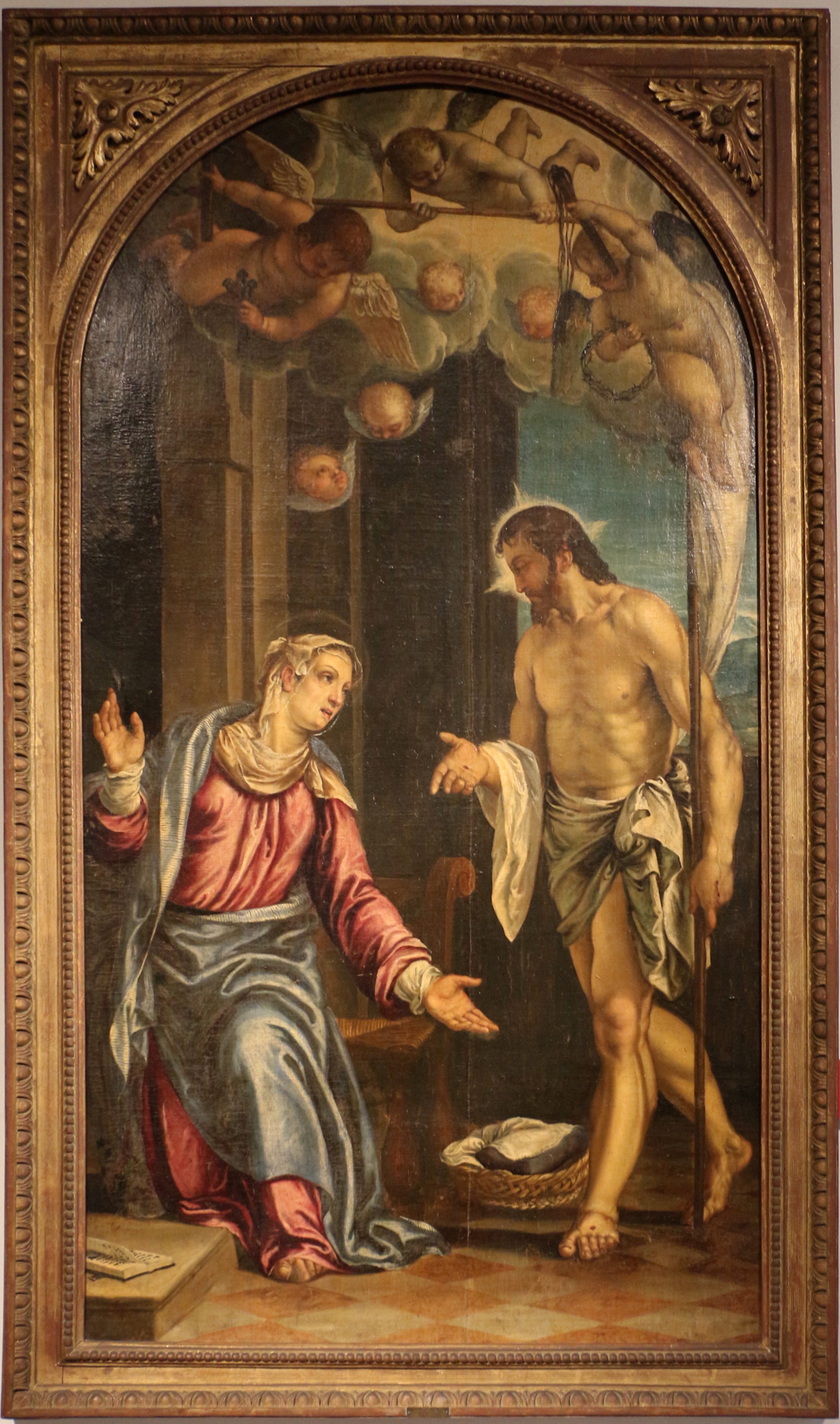
Noli me tangere
