= San Nicolò dei Mendicoli =

Church building in Venice, Italy

Coordinates: 45.4325°N 12.3159°E

Church of San Nicolò dei Mendicoli
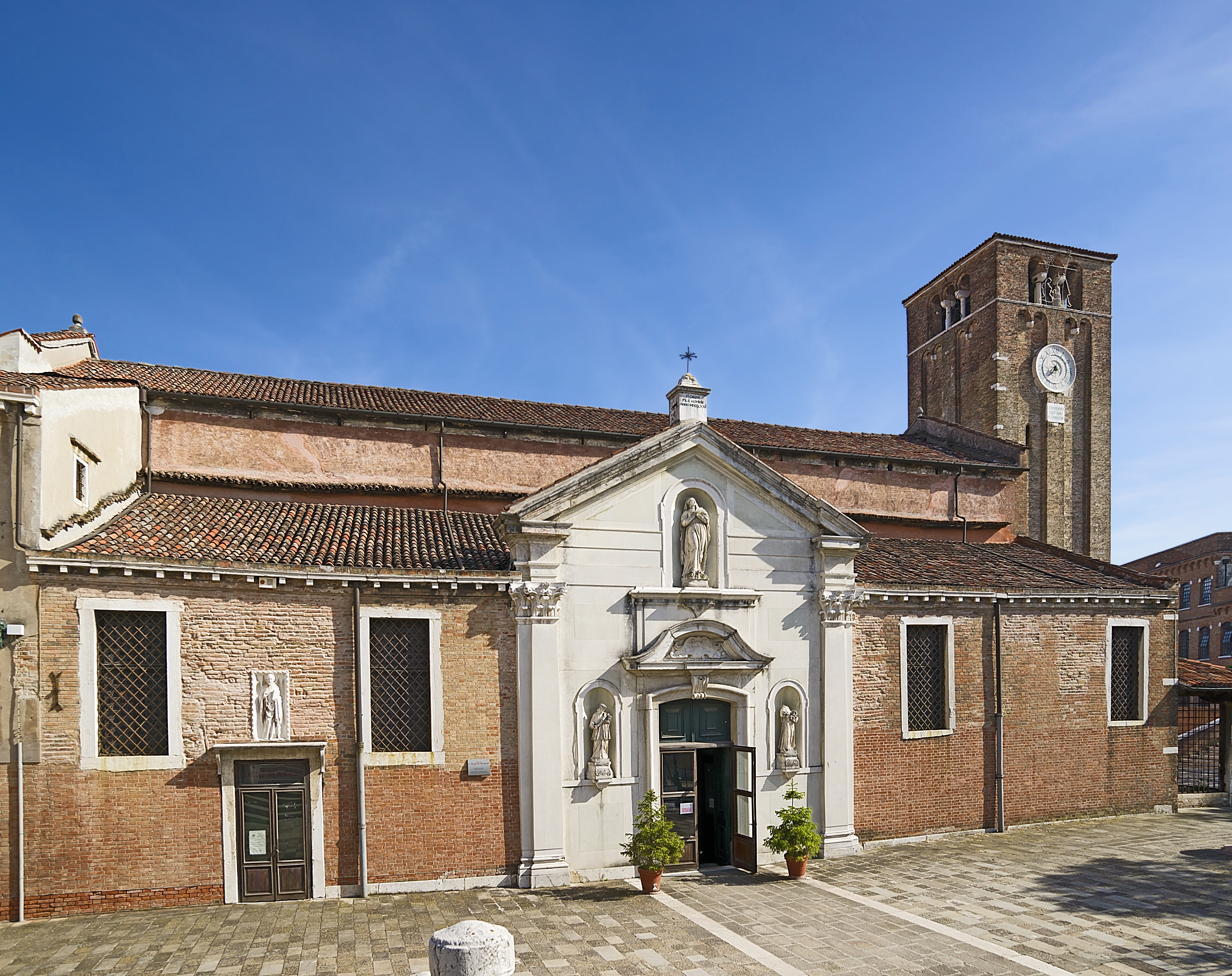

- Location within Venice Location within Italy

Religion
- Affiliation: Roman Catholic
- Province: Venice

Location
- Location: Venice, Italy

Architecture
- Type: Church

San Nicolò dei Mendicoli ("Saint Nicholas of the Beggars") is a church, which is located in the sestiere of Dorsoduro in Venice.

== History ==
The islet where the original church was located previously housed poor fishermen, hence the addition of mendicoli ("beggars") to the name of San Nicolò. From then on, the inhabitants were called Nicolotti. The present structure, including the bell tower, dates from about the 12th century, with frequent remodelings. On the north side of the bell tower is a clock face with a Latin inscription below from 1764, "Lethi vive memor, fugit hora", erroneus version of the aphorism "Vive memor lethi, fugit hora" which roughly translates to "Live remembering death, time flies."

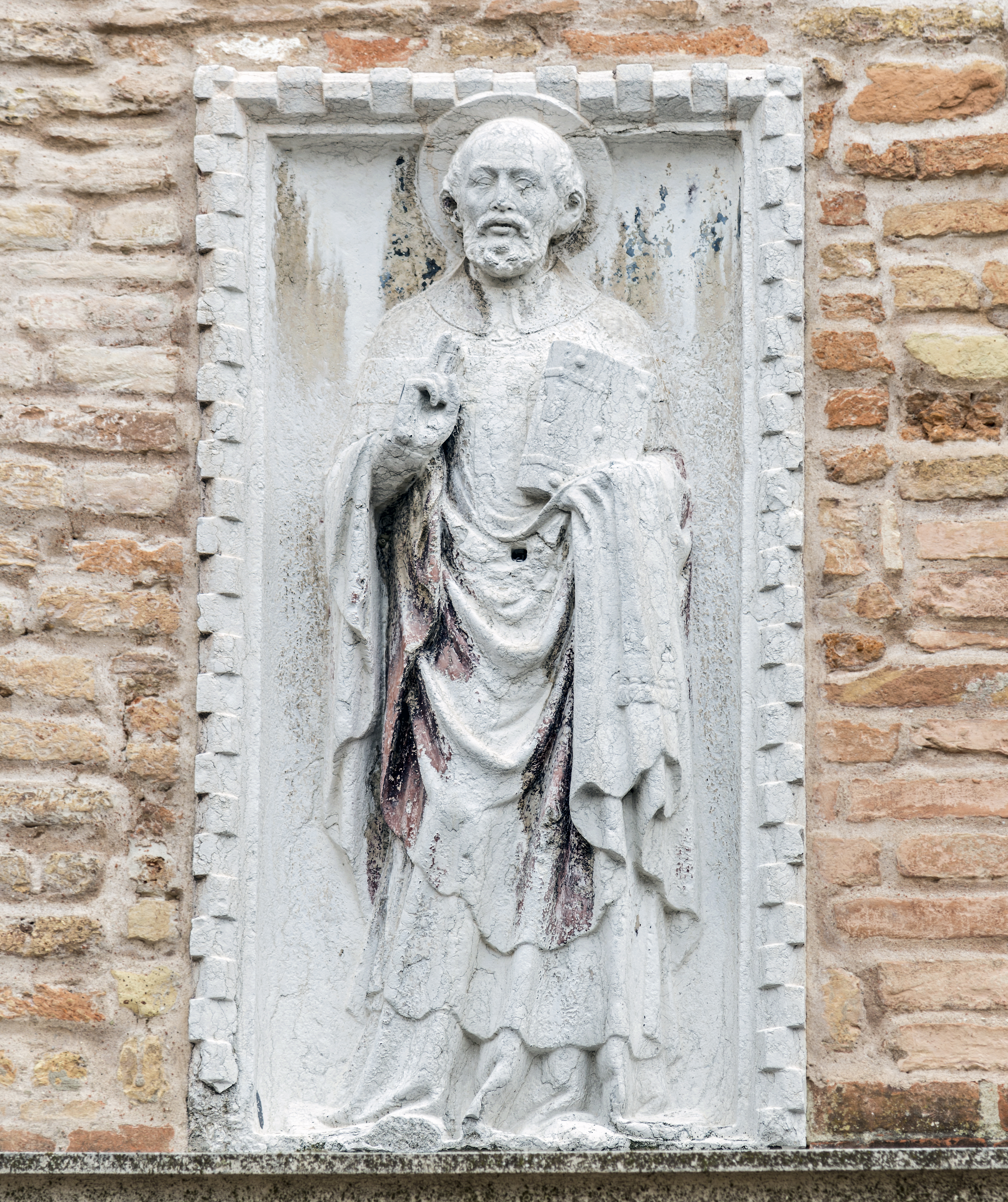
Saint Nicholas 13th century.

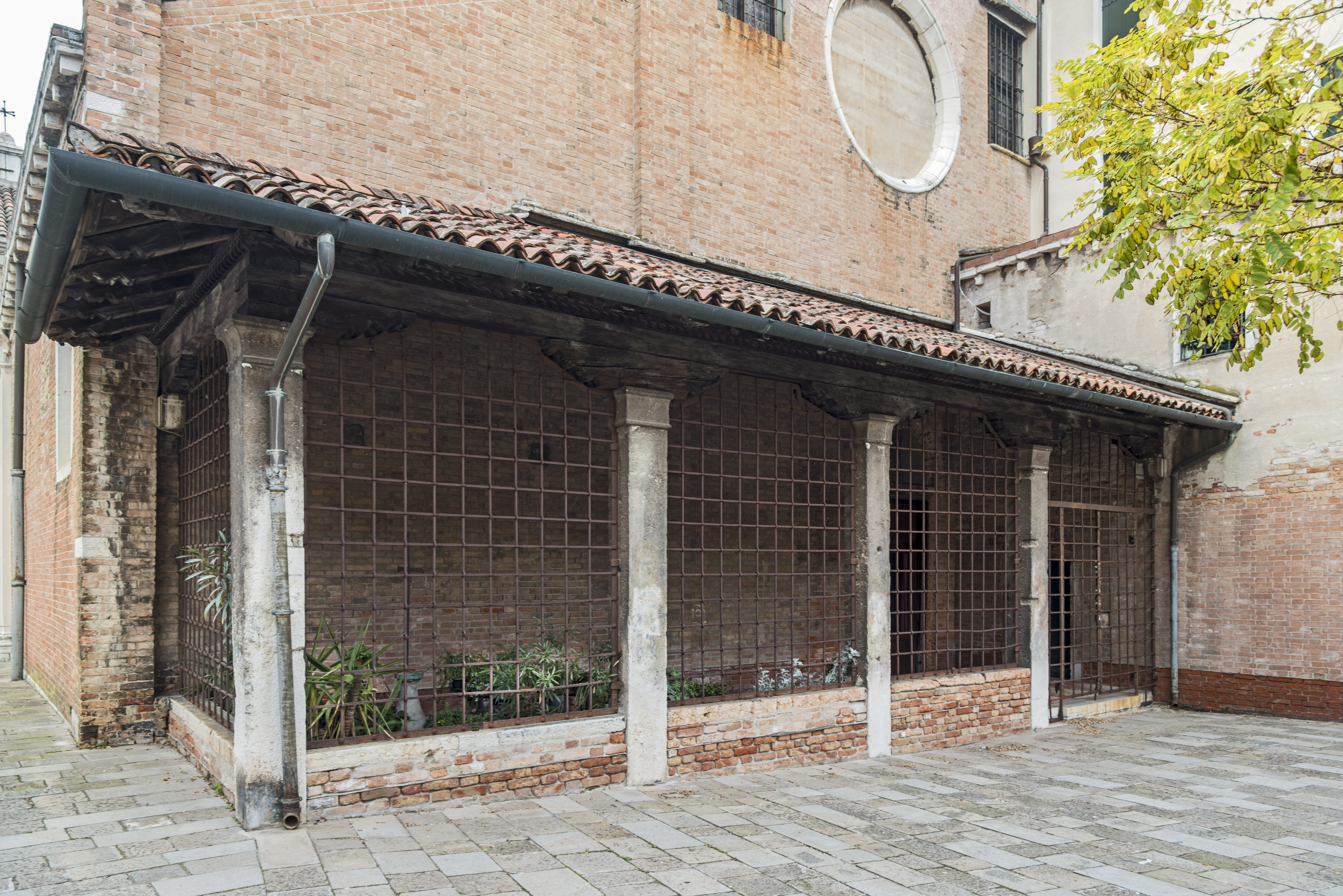
Porch of the north entrance, added in the 15th century.

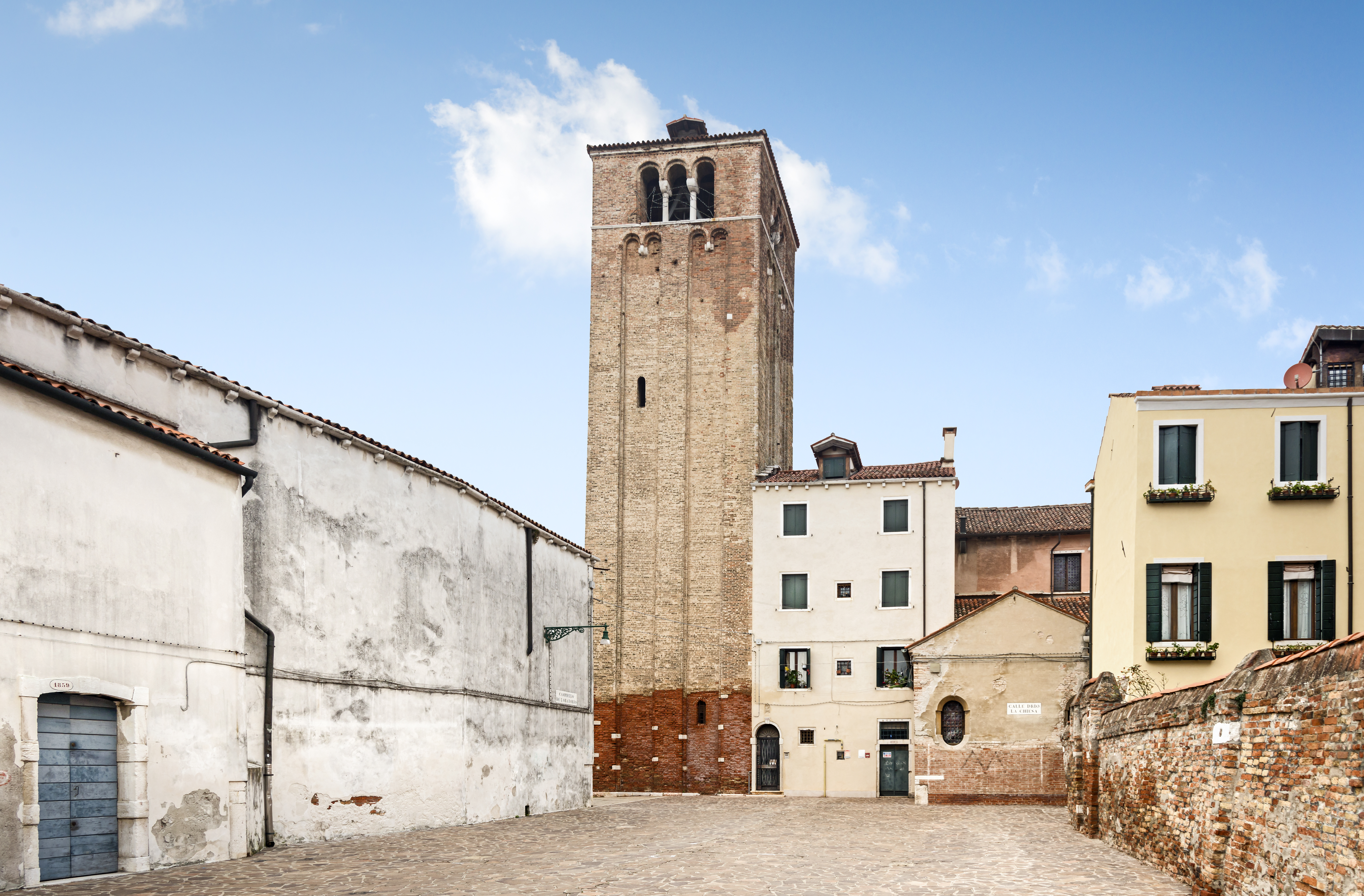
Bell tower of the thirteenth century.

The entrance lies on the right of the nave. The nave is bordered by peculiar Corinthian-like columns. The hooked bills of the capitals derive from the coats of arms of patron families. In the chancel is a 15th-century statue of Saint Nicholas holding three golden spheres, symbolizing the money donated, in his legend, to save three girls from prostitution. The canvases on the nave walls were made by various painters, including Alvise Benfatto. Two end panels on the ceiling are by Leonardo Corona and those in the middle by Francesco Montemezzano.

The church and its interiors were used in the 1973 Nick Roeg film Don't Look Now.

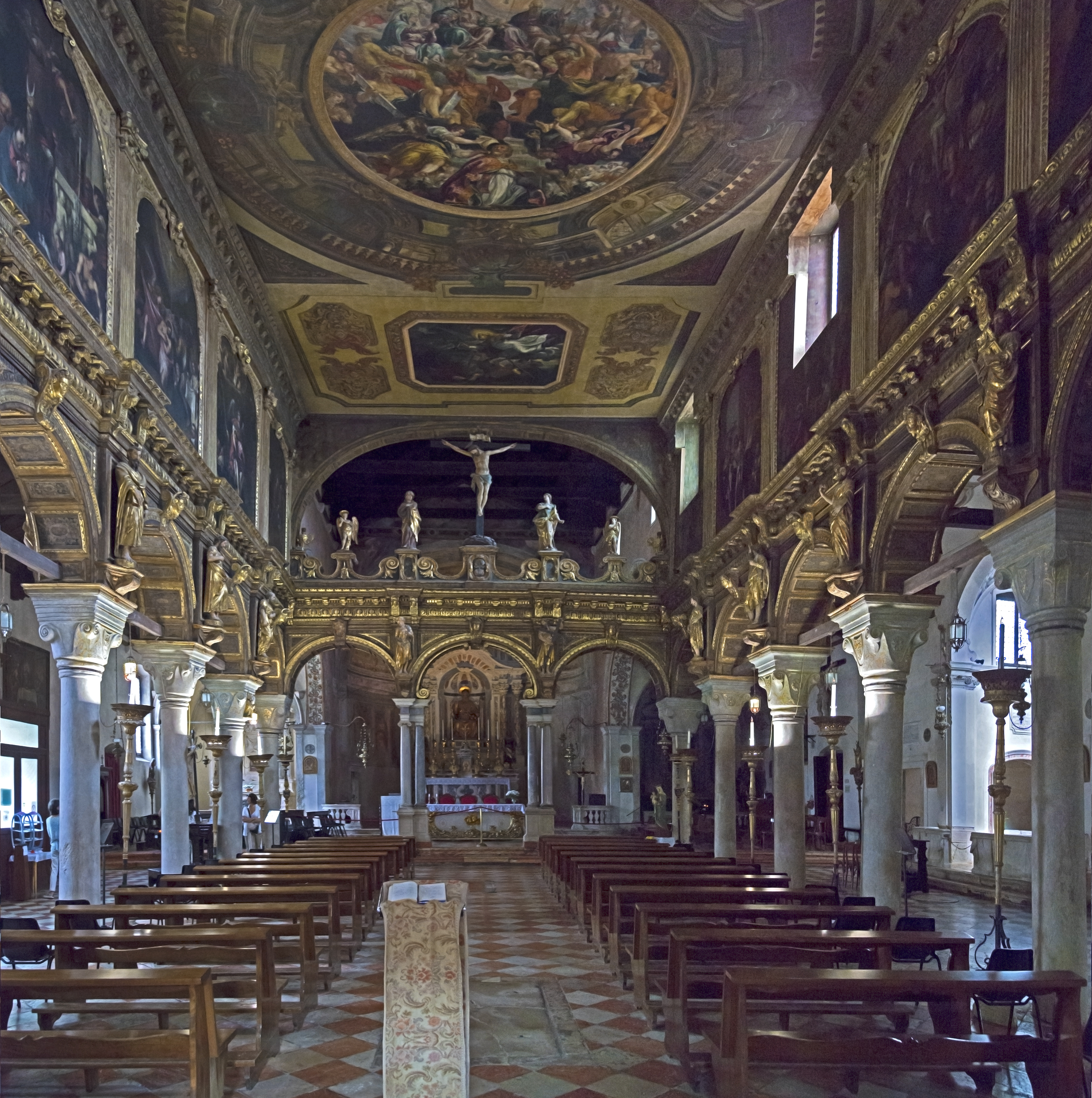
Interior

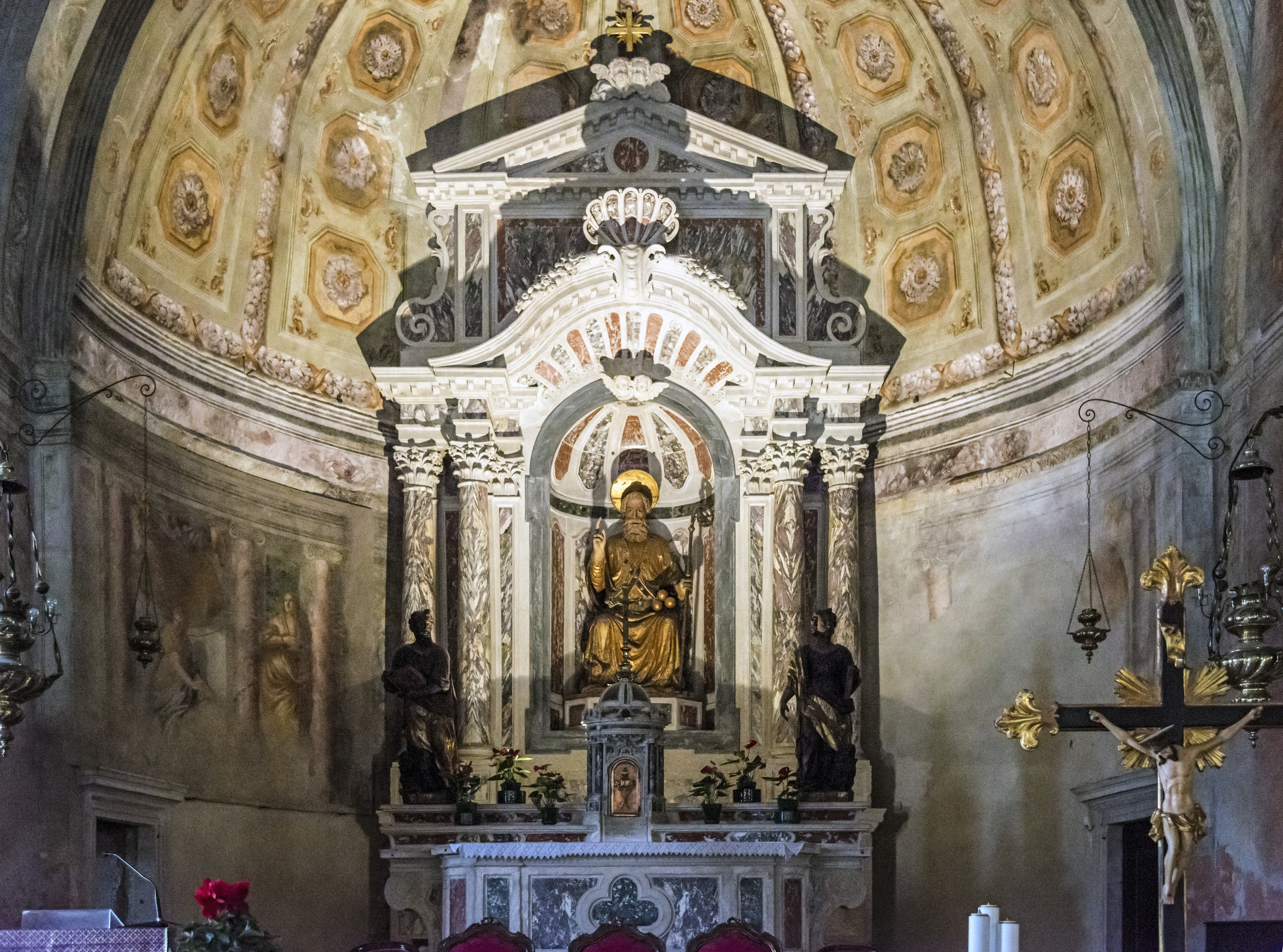
High Altar

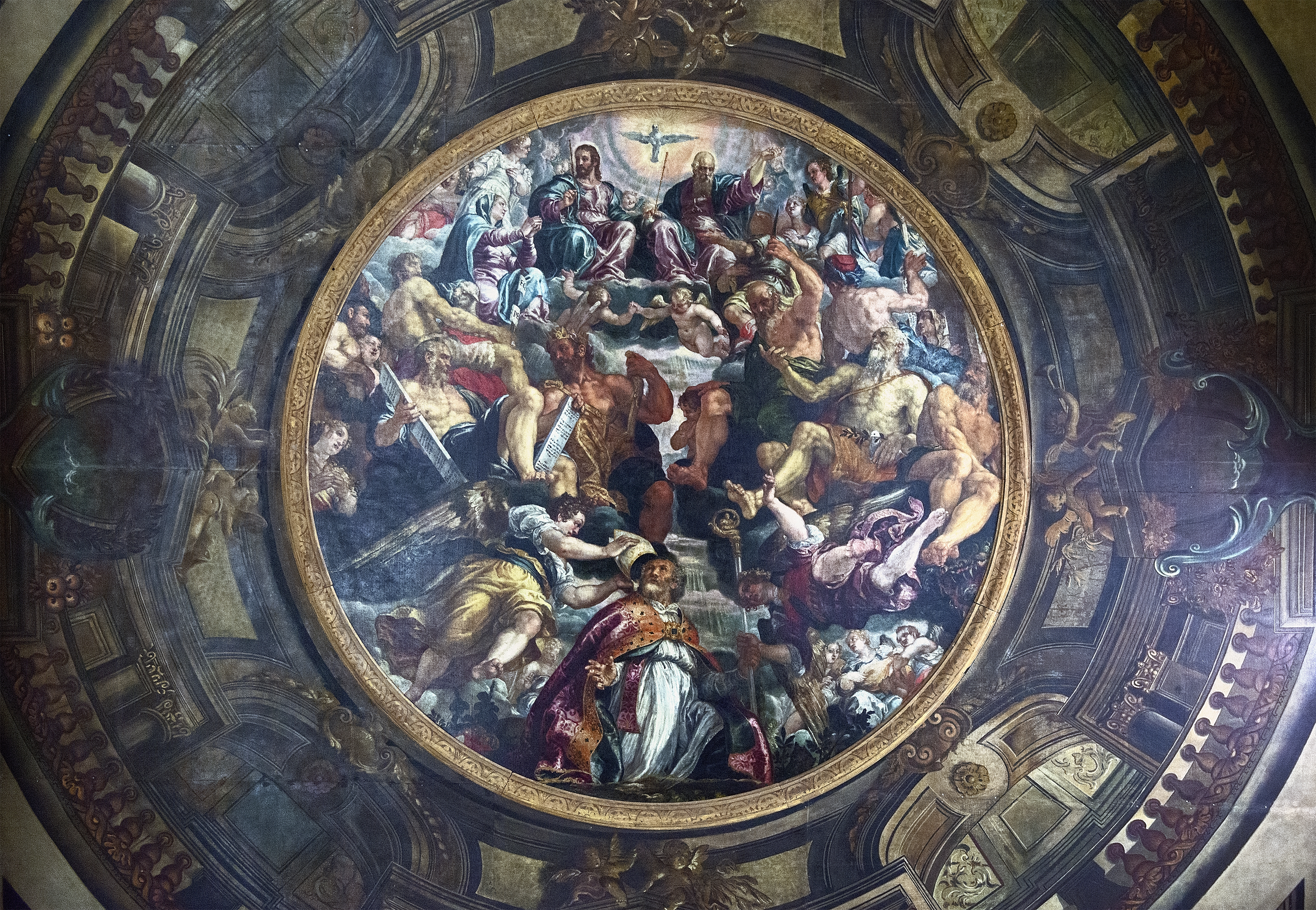
Ceiling by Francesco Montemezzano.

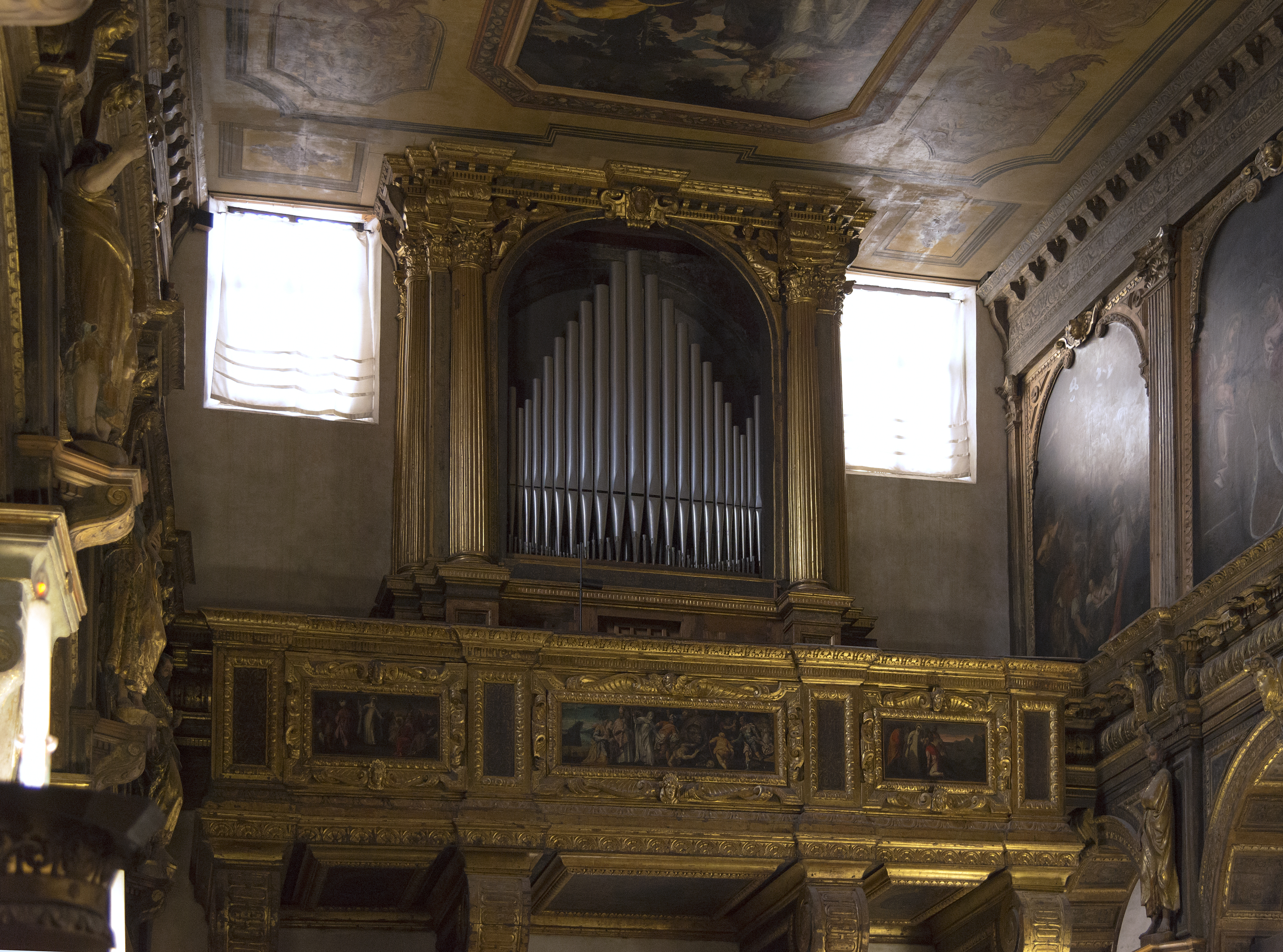
Organ

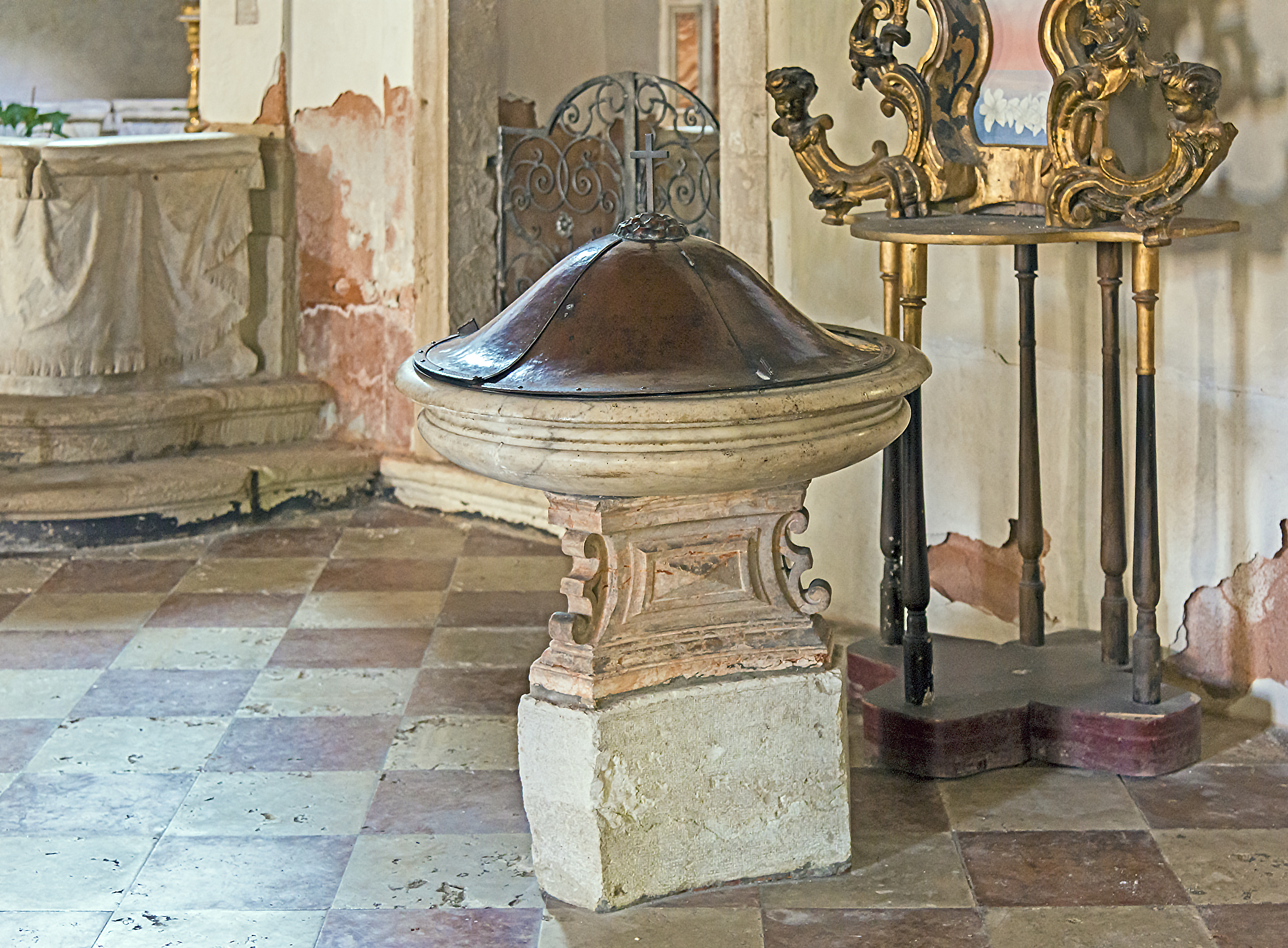
Baptismal font

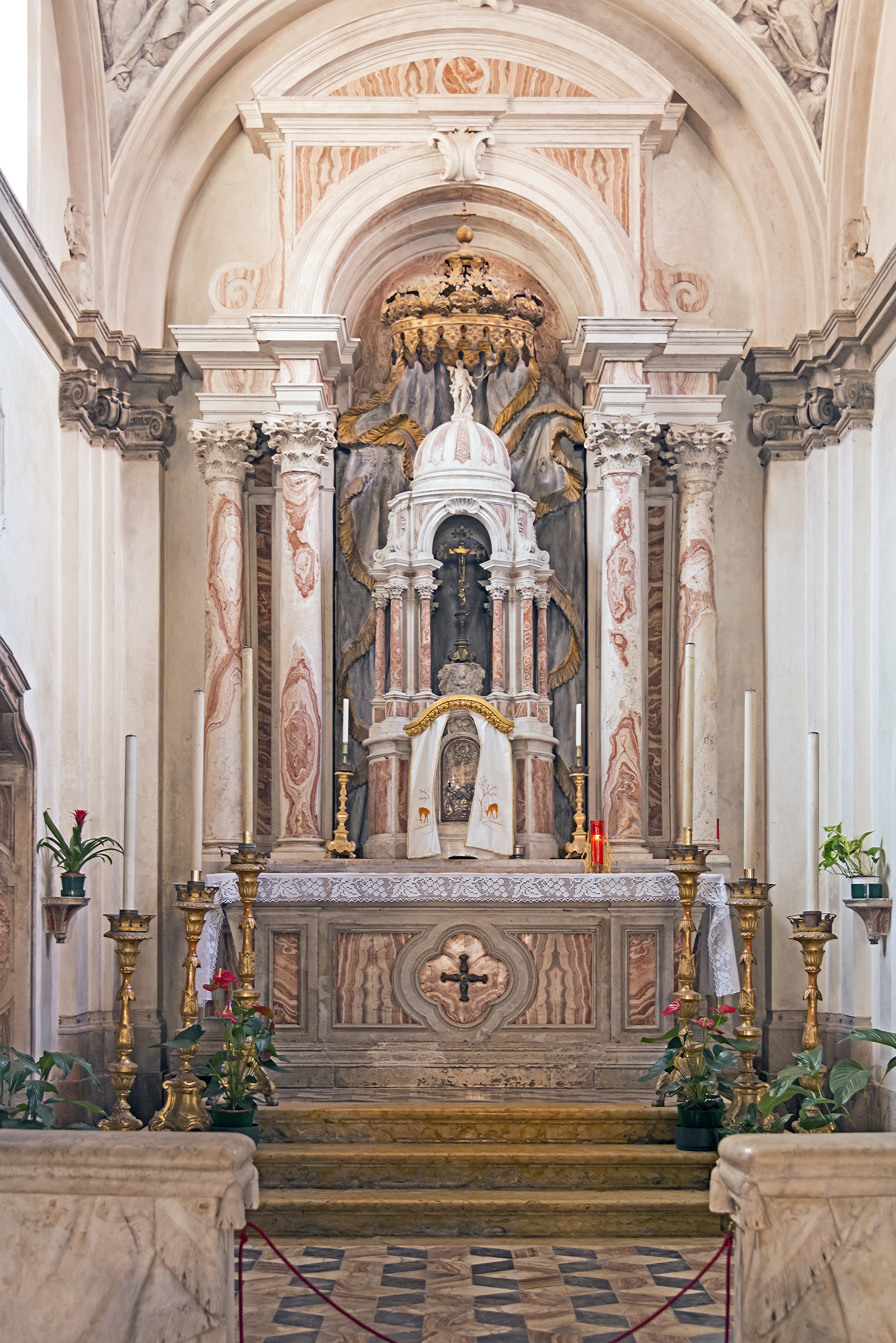
The right chapel
