= St. Mary's Church, Marienberg =

Church in Marienberg, Germany

Coordinates: 50°39′02″N 13°09′56″E

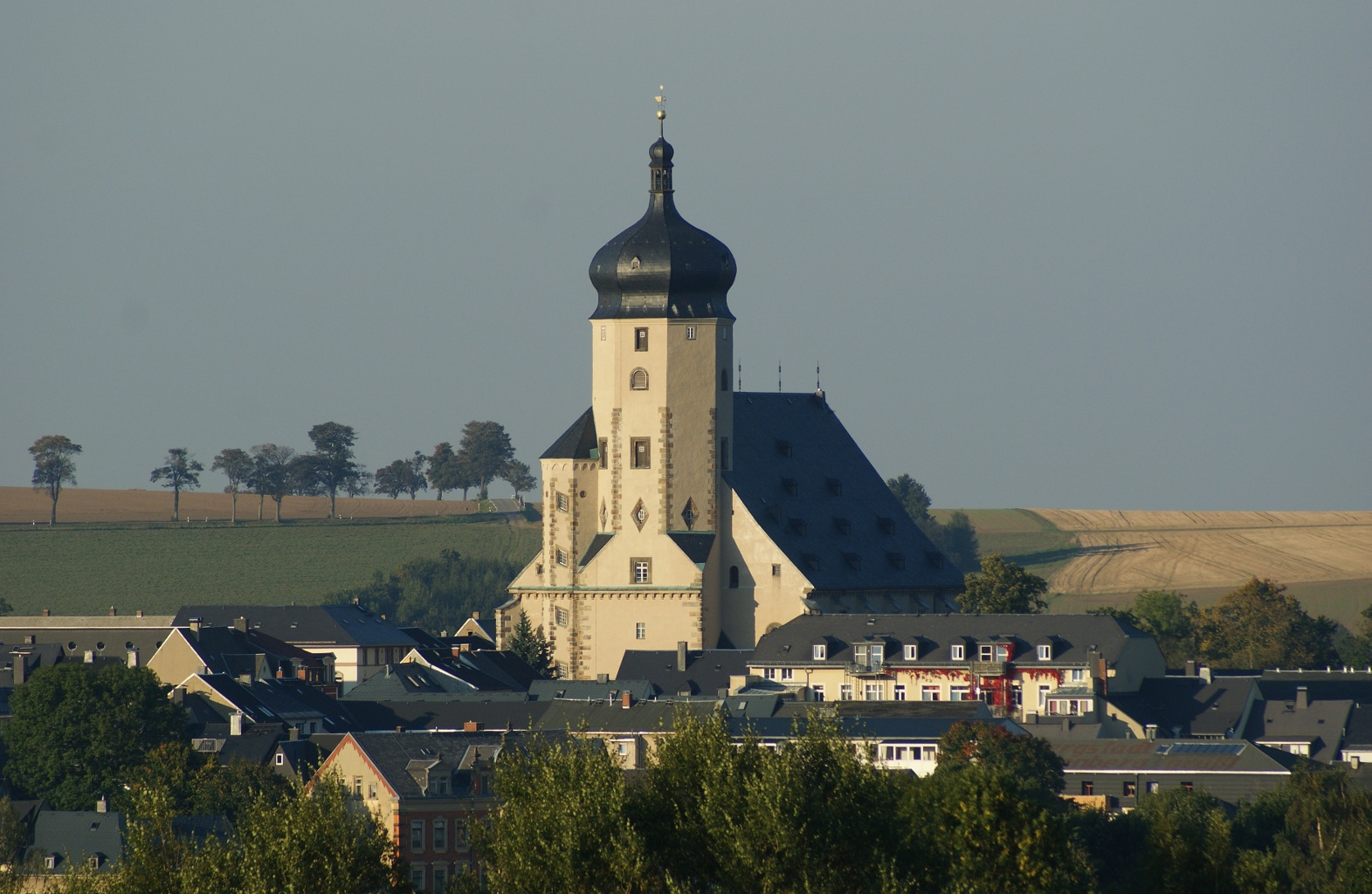
St. Mary's

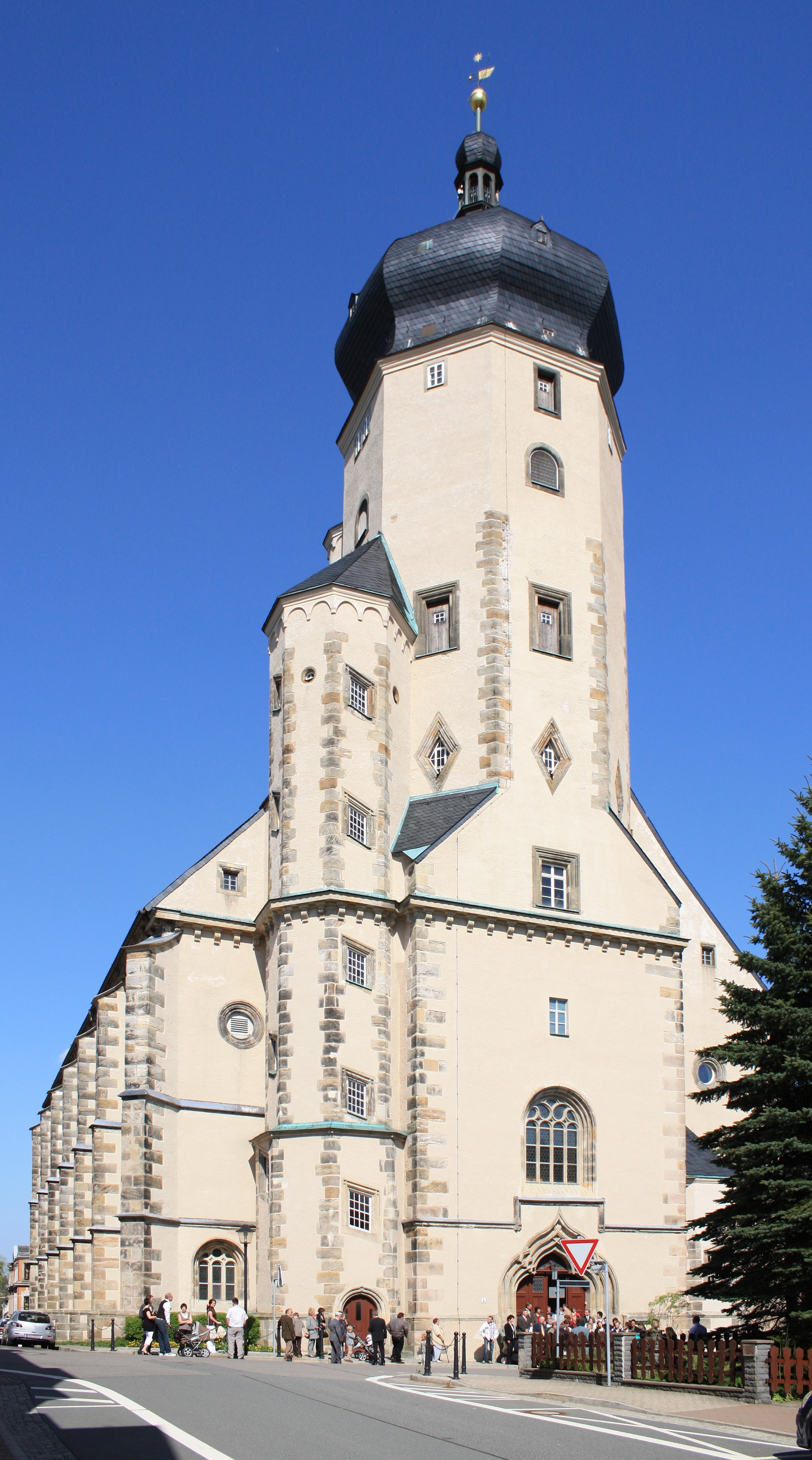
St. Mary's

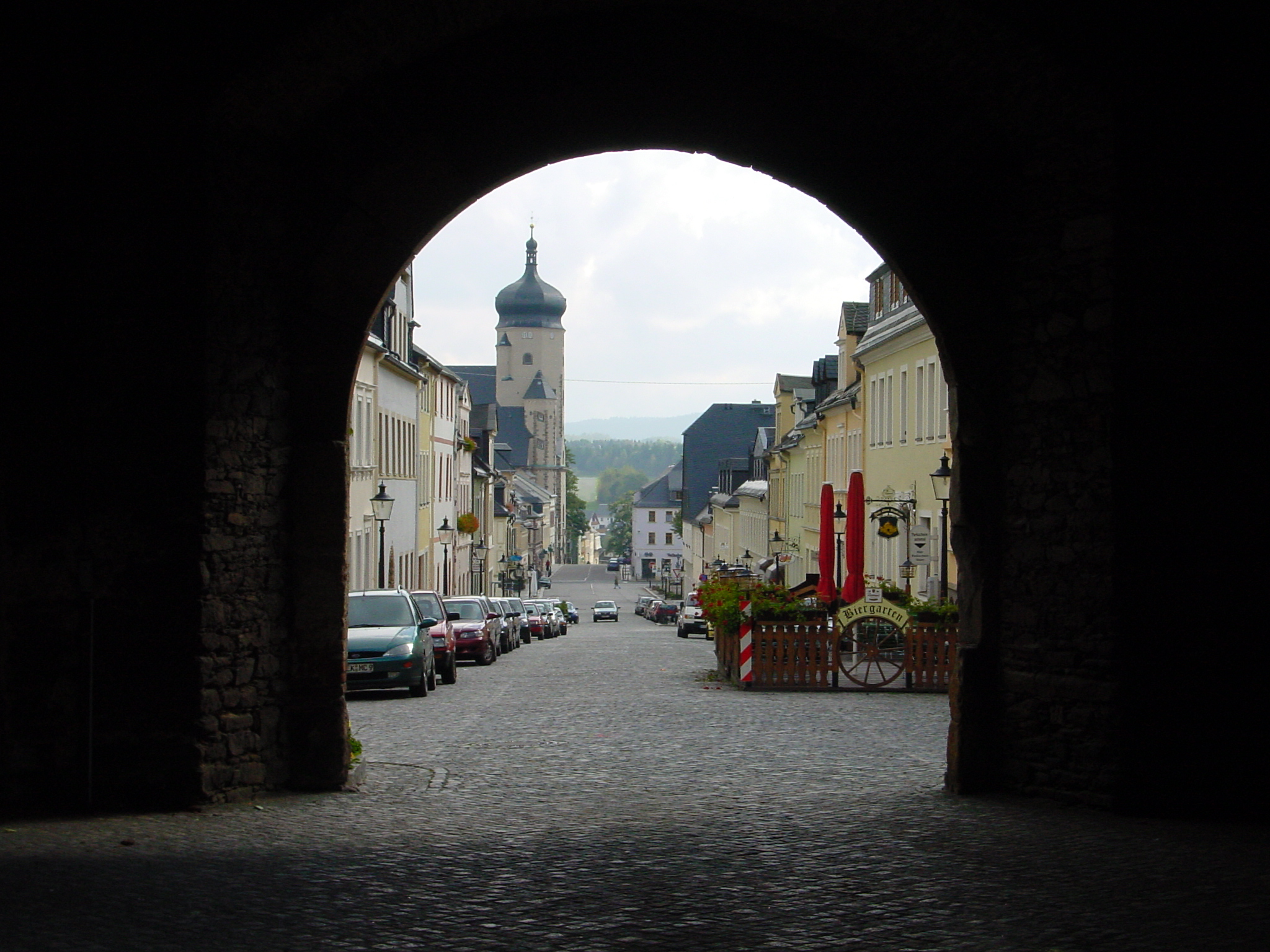
View of the church through the Zschopau Gate

St. Mary's Church (German: St. Marienkirche) in Marienberg in the German state of Saxony is an Evangelical-Lutheran church in the southeast of the county of Erzgebirgskreis. It is the most recent of the three Ore Mountain Late Gothic hall churches.

== Architecture and construction ==
After the Protestants in the town had been given a loghouse church in 1537, the year of the Reformation, this was demolished to make way for the new St. Mary's church. After its foundation stone had been laid in April 1558, the new church was consecrated in February 1564. Construction was initially led by Wolf Blechschmidt from Pirna and, in 1560, taken over by Christoph Kölbel from Plauen. During the town fire on 31 August 1610 the church was burned down apart from its outer walls, the tower and the later vestry. From 1611 to 1616 it was given a roof, posts and rood loft, all made from wood. In 1616, services were held once more in the church and the triumphal cross was set up again. A new altar was installed in 1617. The wooden posts and roof were replaced from 1669 to 1675 by Andreas Klengel using Tuscan stone columns and a groin vault with stuccoed ribs.

The hall of the ashlar building is 45 metres long and 26 metres wide and has an irregular, pentagonal chancel in which the old vestry with its inflexed arch windows and door is located. The three aisles are the same height. Chancel and nave have high two-storey, four-panelled round arch windows with tracery and a rich profile. In the cornice beneath the eaves, Renaissance figures are visible. The high gable roof has numerous dormers, grouped in a triangle. The onion dome of the west tower, which is flanked by two staircase towers, dates to 1616. The lavishly decorated portal at the west end dates to the period before the great fire and has an ordered ogee arch and Verstabungen.

In the old baptistry is a plain rib with a portrait, characteristic of Blechschmidt. In the porch of the left hand tower, as well as Blechschmidt's stonemason's marks are portraits presumably of Prince Elector Augustus and his wife, Anne of Denmark, which were richly given to the building, as well as other stonemason's marks.

== Interior architecture ==
The stellar vaulting in the narthex and the two adjacent rooms date to the first phase of building. A pointed arch portal with Verstabungen leads to the tower staircase. The vault of the light, seven-bay nave, despite its Gothic arches, is characterised by stucco in the baroque style. Above the capitals of the mighty columns are free-standing acanthus branches, separating arches and the transverse arches of the side aisles with stuccoed acanthus ornamentation.

The stuccoed cloth hangers (Tuchgehänge), fruit cords (Fruchtschnüre) and 25 angels' heads on the balustrades of the surrounding rood screens were prepared under the direction of Italian stuccoer, Alessandro Pernasione, who had been commissioned by the senior state architect (Oberlandbaumeister), Wolf Caspar von Klengel. The design of the organ loft of 1896 is less accomplished. The ribbed vaulting of the sacristy on the eastern side dates to the years 1558 to 1560.

== Furnishings ==
The richly decorated altar is built on wooden columns and has scrollwork by Andreas Hellmert dating to 1617. The mannerist paintings are by the court artist in Dresden, Kilian Fabricius. The eucharist is portrayed in the predella, the birth of Christ in the main panel, his entombment in the upper panel and the annunciation on the sides. On the halter of the donkey is the inscription "DAMNARE POTEST QUI MELIORA FACIT" ("He may criticize, who does better"). On the collar of the dog is the date 1616. The figures of Moses and John the Baptist probably date to the 16th century.

The sandstone pulpit, with its steps, a simple pedestal and rich strapwork ornamentation was made after 1610. The pulpit ceiling dates to 1896 and bears the Latin inscription: "QUI EX DEO EST VERBUM DEI AUDIT Johann 8" ("Whoever belongs to God hears what God says"). The font is made of Crottendorf marble and dates to 1860. It was given to the church by an anonymous donor from the parish.

During the renovation and repainting of the nave in 1896 a stained glass window was installed by the Zittau firm of Türcke, which portrays Christ as the judge of the world. In 1954 the interior was painted in a shade of grey.

The lifesize crucifix dates to the mid-17th century. The two lifesize wooden mining figures were carved in 1687 and were formerly caryatids for the pew used by the mining office. The two mining lanterns date to 1614 and 1743.

The Late Gothic carved altar from a workshop in Freiberg was manufactured in the early 16th century and comes from the hospital church in Lengefeld that burned down in 1892. In the centre panel Mary is depicted between Saints Peter and Paul; on the inner face is the Passion and on the outer sides the Evangelists. The wings probably came from the workshop of Michael Wohlgemut. The altar was restored and set out again in April 2001.

The small carved altar with Anna selbdritt comes from the Marienberg chapel of St Fabian and St Sebastian, which had been built shortly after the foundation of the town near the Zschopau Gate.

=== Organ ===
The great organ by Carl Eduard Schubert was built from 1872 to 1879. The mechanical instrument, designed like a Silbermann has 51 organ stops on three manuals and pedals with 3,158 pipes.

I Great (Hauptwerk) C–f^{3}
1.	Principal	Prinzipal	16'
2.	Octave	Oktav	8'
3.	Gamba	Gamba	8'
4.	Dolcissimo	Dolcissimo	8'
5.	Bourdon	Bordun	8'
6.	Quint	Quint	6'
7.	Octave	Oktav	4'
8.	Spitzflute	Spitzflote	4'
9.	Quinta	Quinta	3'
10.	Octave	Oktav	2'
11.	Tierce	Terz	1'
12.	Mixture V	Mixtur V	6'
13.	Cymbal IV	Cimbel IV	z
14.	Cornet IV	Cornet IV	(ab a^{0})
15.	Trumpet	Trompete	8'

II Swell C–f^{3}
16.	Bourdon	16'
17.	Fugara	8'
18.	Rohr Flute	8'
19.	Gemshorn	8'
20.	Quintadena	8'
21.	Violin Principal	4'
22.	Gemshorn	4'
23.	Flauto dolce	4'
24.	Cymbal II	3'
25.	Bassoon	16'

III Oberwerk C–f^{3}
26.	Quintadena	16'
27.	Principal	8'
28.	Salicional	8'
29.	Lieblich Gedackt	8'
30.	Octave	4'
31.	Rohr Flute	4'
32.	Flauto traverso	4'
33.	Nazard	3'
34.	Octave	2'
35.	Quinte	1^{1}/_{2}'
36.	Octave	1'
37.	Sesquialtera II	^{4}/_{5}'
38.	Mixture IV
39.	Oboe	8'

Pedal C–3^{1}
40.	Principal Bass	16'
41.	Cello Bass	16'
42.	Fugara Bass	16'
43.	Sub Bass	16'
44.	Quint Bass	12'
45.	Octave Bass	8'
46.	Cello	8'
47.	Octave Bass	4'
48.	Cymbal II	3'
49.	Trombone	32'
50.	Trombone Bass	16'
51.	Trumpet Bass	8'

- Couplers: II/I, III/I, III/II, I/P
- Accessories:

Fixed combinations (p, f, Tutti), 256 setting, swell pedal (Crescendowalze).

== Literature ==
- Georg Dehio: Handbuch der Deutschen Kunstdenkmäler Sachsen: II. Regierungsbezirke Leipzig und Chemnitz. Deutscher Kunstverlag, Munich, 1998, pp. 874f.
- Wolfgang Ranft: Die St. Marienkirche zu Marienberg. In: Sächsische Heimatblätter 52 (2006), Vol. 3, pp. 264–271
