= Voussoir =

Wedge-shaped element used in building an arch or vault

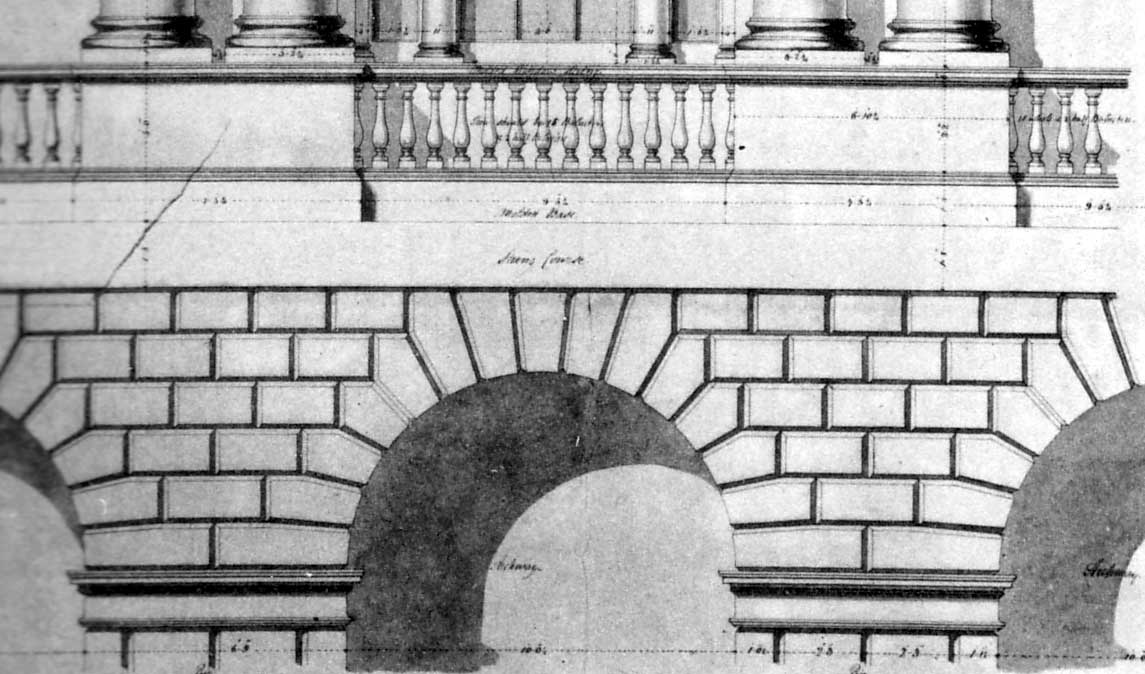
William Henry Playfair, University of Edinburgh: bevelled edges of each stone block emphasise the voussoirs, which have a curved base and together form a semi-circle at the top of each arch.

A voussoir (UK: /ˈvuːˈswɑː/; US: /vuˈswɑːr/) is a wedge-shaped element, typically a stone, which is used in building an arch or vault.

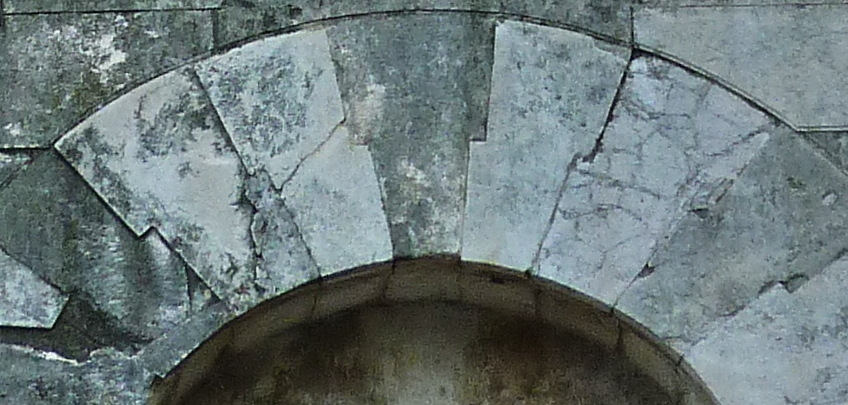
Joggled voussoir arch, located at the Mausoleum of Theodoric in Ravenna, Italy. (520 CE)

Each voussoir is formed in a specific way to fit within the arch or vault created. Normally, different colored stones are shaped to fit together in a curved way that relies on the balance of each other to stay in place. The shaping of the individual wedge pieces varies depending on the type of arch being constructed—round, pointed, horseshoe, multifoil (which require voussoirs to be cut at different angles), and joggled. Joggled voussoirs were originally developed in Roman architecture to strengthen the structure, before being utilized in Islamic architecture. The wedged pieces have a curved shape, almost resembling puzzle pieces that fit together and lock into place. Joggled voussoirs were adopted by Islamic architects in order to strengthen arches and bridges by allowing them to sway with the movements of potential earthquakes and move back to their original position.

Although each unit in an arch or vault is a voussoir, there is distinct functional importance in two positions. Springers are the lowest voussoir on each side, located where the curve of the arch springs from the vertical support or abutment of the wall or pier. Springers often require precise shaping to control the direction of thrust and ensure successful transfer of weight to the supports below. The keystone is the center stone or masonry unit at the apex of an arch that locks the voussoirs in place.

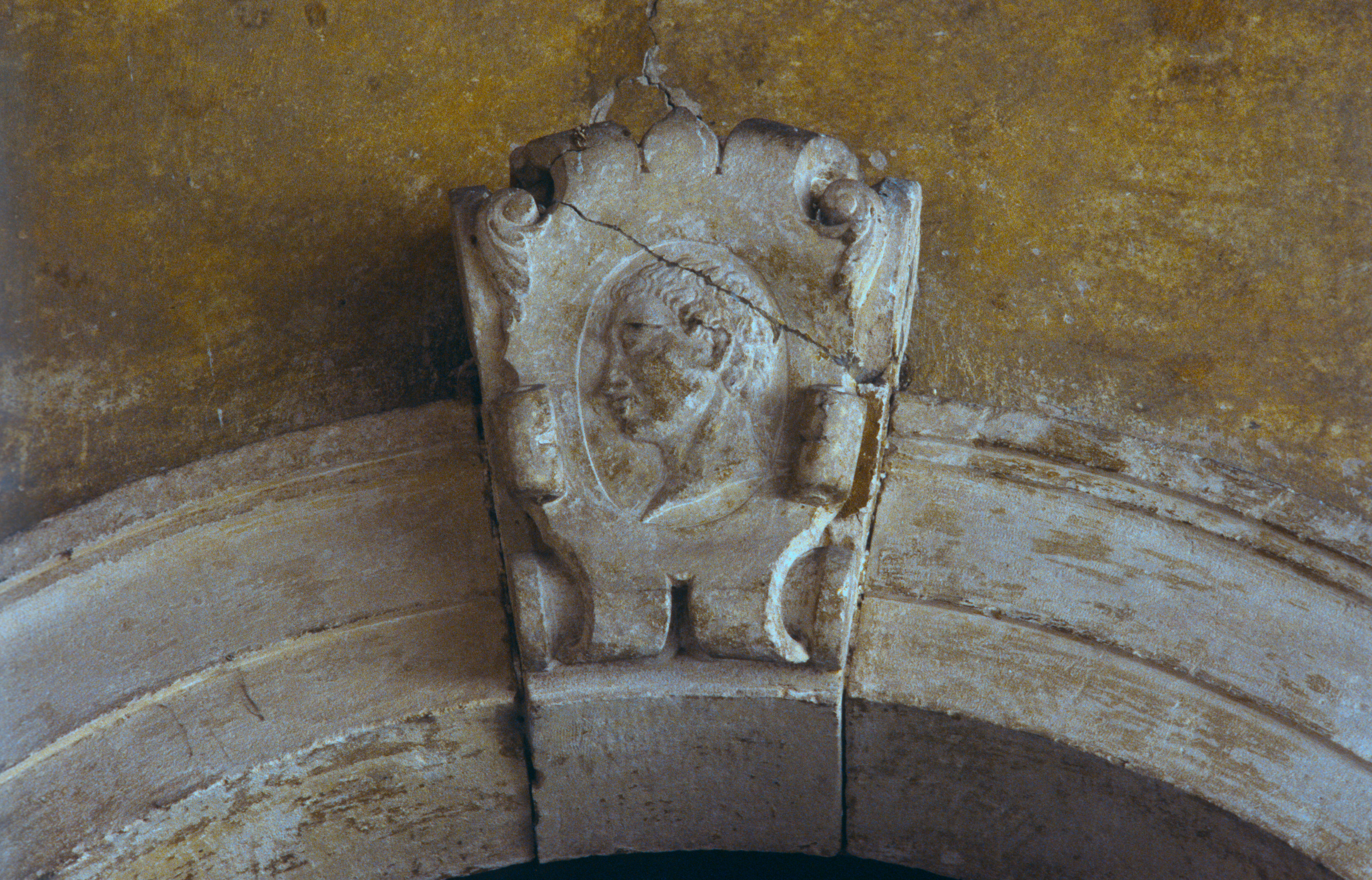
Keystone arch, Italian courtyard, 16th-century late Renaissance (Mannerism).

The keystone is often decorated or enlarged. An enlarged and sometimes slightly dropped keystone is often found in Mannerist arches of the 16th century, beginning with the works of Giulio Romano, who also began the fashion for using voussoirs above rectangular openings, rather than a lintel (Palazzo Stati Maccarani, Rome, circa 1522). Taller keystones add a sense of stability, allowing the arches to be constructed more easily, with the keystone being dropped into the center of the arch. This central point on the arch balances the structure, but also starts an important identifying factor of Islam architecture and artistry. Many times throughout history, keystones were carved decoratively to highlight the central piece, usually with vegetal designs or inscriptions. In many architectural traditions, the keystone became a location for ornamental carving because of its visually prominent position.

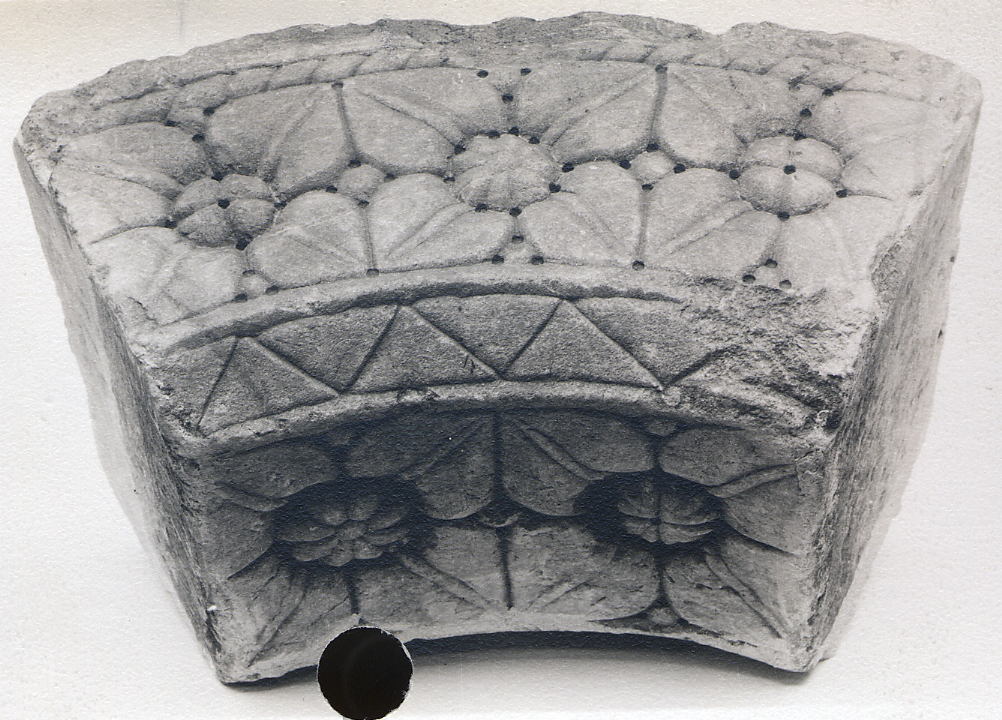
A single voussoir unit, made of marble, 6 5/8 x 14 1/2 in. (16.8 x 36.8 cm) 1130–40.

Each wedge-shaped voussoir turns aside the thrust of the mass above, transferring it from stone to stone to the springer's bottom face (impost), which is horizontal and passes the thrust on to the buttresses, piers or abutments. Voussoir arches distribute weight efficiently, and take maximum advantage of the compressive strength of stone, as in an arch bridge. The outer boundary of a voussoir forms an extrados, internal - an intrados (soffit).

In Visigothic, Moorish, and Damascene architectural traditions, the voussoirs are often in alternating colours (ablaq), which is also found sometimes in Romanesque architecture. Leading into the Umayyad period, the alternating colors were used for decorative purposes, but also based on the material available at the time (brick and stone). With this, the alternating red and white stones created an association to Islamic art and ‘Abd al-Rahman I himself, as well as his followers during the Umayyad period.

== Symbolism ==
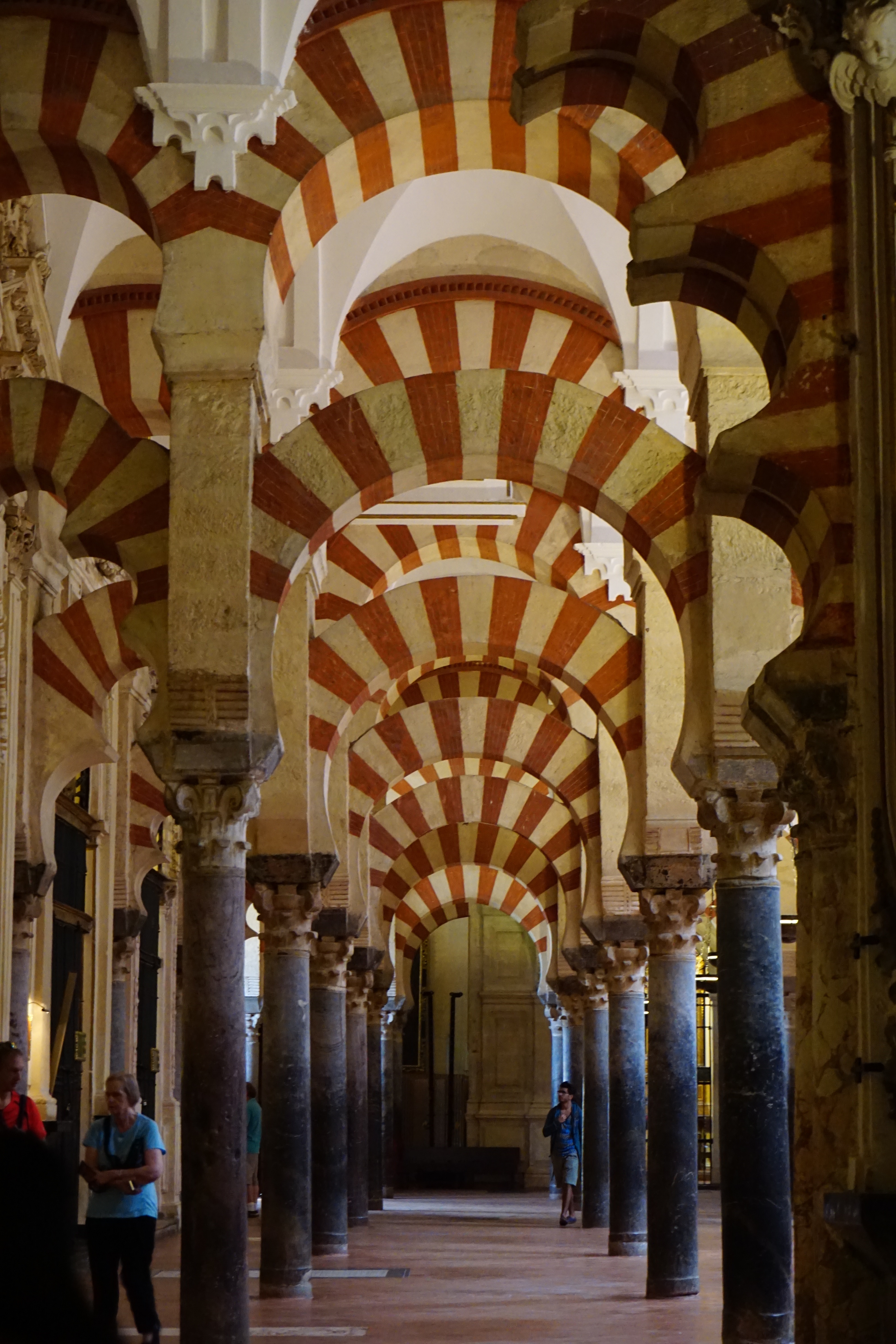
Striped arches in the Great Mosque of Córdoba

Alternating colored voussoirs, known as striped arches, have specific historical and political meanings in medieval architecture.

In the early Islamic architecture, alternating voussoirs showed the power and wealth of the Umayyads. After the fall of Umayyad Caliphate in Syria, Abd al-Rahman I used alternating brick and stone voussoirs in the Great Mosque of Córdoba. This recreation of the marble revetment of the Great Mosque of Damascus was a symbol of Umayyad authority in the Iberian Peninsula.

In 12th-century Romanesque architecture churches like Sainte-Madeleine at Vézelay and Le Puy Cathedral, banded arches reminded visitors of the First Crusade and the Holy Land. When crusaders captured Jerusalem, they declared the Dome of the Rock, with its interior arcades made of alternating marble voussoirs, as the Templum Domini (Temple of the Lord). These multi-colored arches became a clear symbol of Jerusalem and the crusades in Western Europe. At Cluniac monastery sites in Spain, like San Pedro de Cardeña, this decor was also used to represent Muslim enemies during the Reconquista.

The keystone represents power and strength as a central element of the arch.

== Examples of voussoirs ==
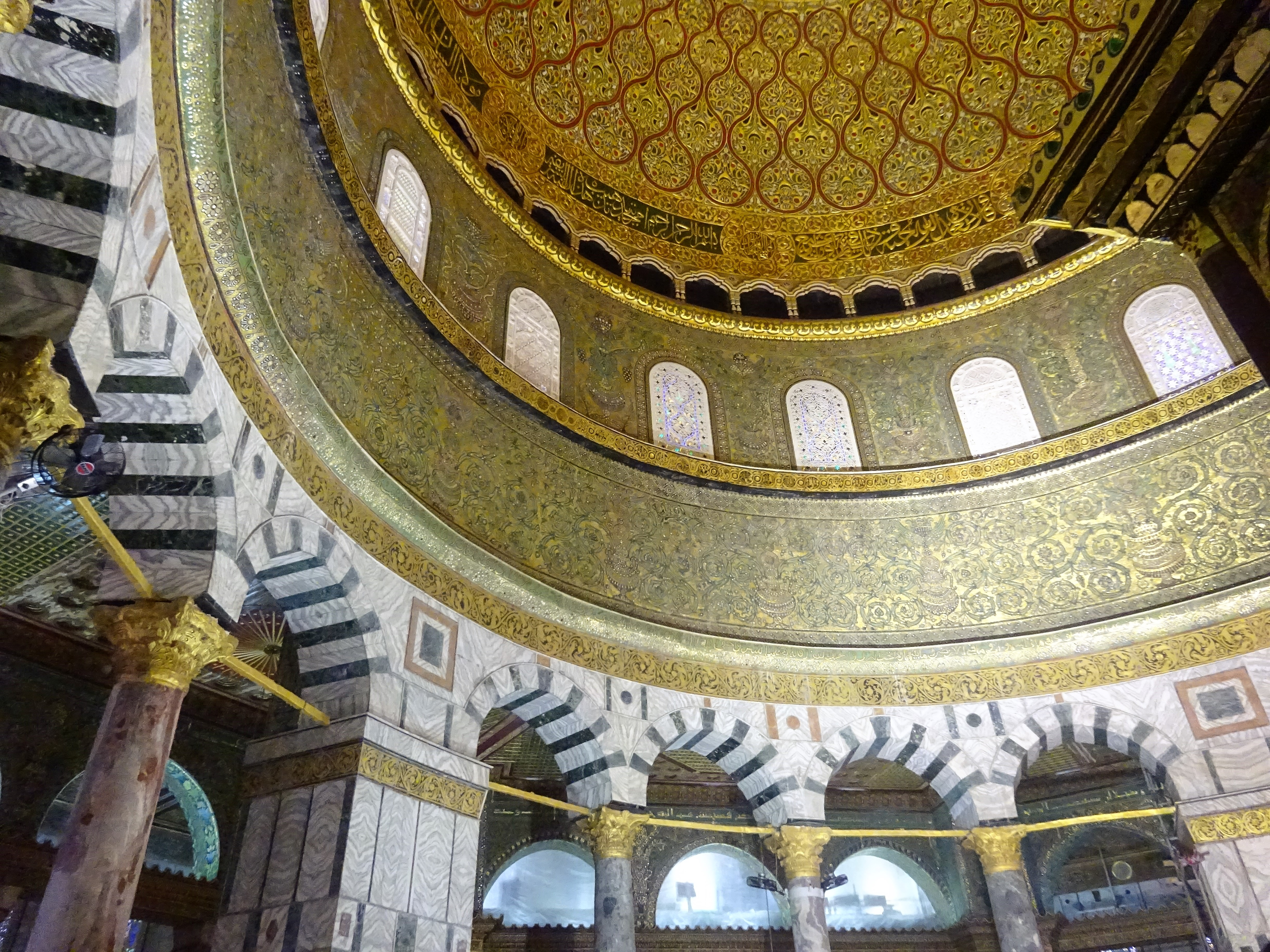
Inside, upward view of the Dome of the Rock highlighting colorful and detailed voussoirs.

The Dome of the Rock displays voussoirs creating the arches inside the monument. The green and white colored voussoirs exemplify the Umayyad style by continuing a sense of divineness, in comparison with using mosaics, inscriptions, and carvings. In doing so, concepts of vases and vegetal designs, paired with the updated architecture of the voussoirs, establish a sense of power during the time.

The Great Mosque of Córdoba also contains prominent voussoirs displayed in arch form, utilizing the Cordoban Caliphate arch concept. The arches are in sets of two, lined in rows and columns. In regards to the Umayyad period, these voussoirs focused on three main components: the red and white coloring, textured wedge shapes, and intricate detail. The architectural form also changed during the time to make the stones wider and more radial. Using different colored voussoirs helps highlight the shape of the arch and makes it easier to see how the pieces fit together.

== Etymology ==
The word is a stonemason's term borrowed in Middle English from French verbs connoting a "turn" (OED).

== See also ==
- Glossary of architecture

== Sources ==
- Brush, Mary Buchanan (1991). The Role of Historical Elements in Postmodernism: An Attempt to Converse Through Keystones (MS thesis). University of Pennsylvania. Archived from the original on 28 March 2025.
- Dodds, Jerrilynn (2011). "Remembering the Crusades in the Fabric of Buildings: Preliminary Thoughts about Alternating Voussoirs". Sites and Structures: Cities, Buildings, and Bodies. The Johns Hopkins University Press.
