= Santa Maria Antica, Verona =

Church building in Verona, Italy

Coordinates: 45.443675°N 10.999073°E

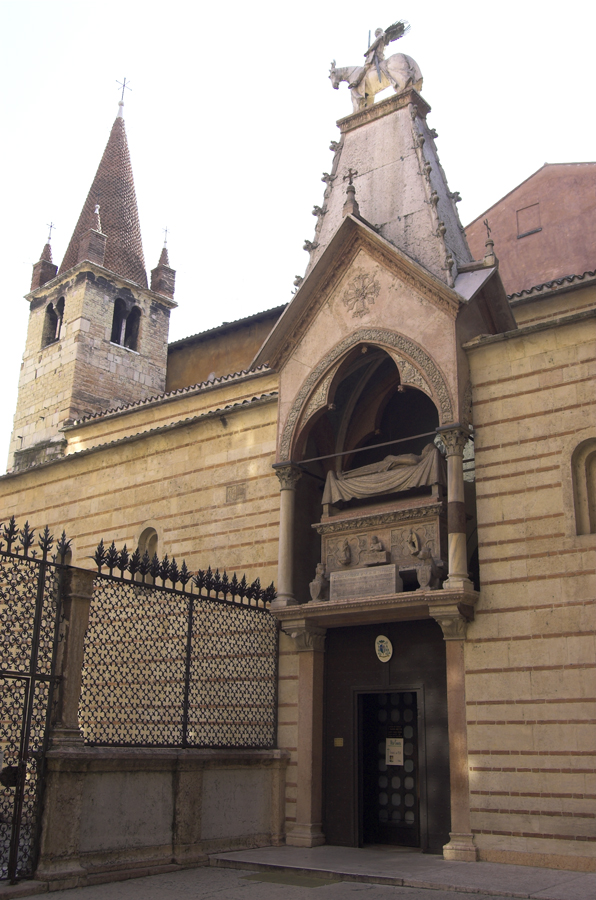
Side entrance.

Santa Maria Antica is a Roman Catholic church in Verona, Italy. The current church is Romanesque in style and dates to 1185, rebuilt after the earthquake of 1117 destroyed the original building that dated back to the end of the period of Lombard domination in the 8th century. The only surviving remains of the 8th-century building is a fragment of black and white mosaic floor.

The current building was dedicated by the patriarch of Aquileia and acted as the private chapel of Verona's ruling Scaligeri family, located beside their family cemetery (the site of the 13th-century Scaliger Tombs). The church has a small tuff bell tower (with three baroque bells) in a purely Romanesque style, with mullioned windows and a brick-covered spire. Around 1630 the three-nave interior was altered to the Baroque style, though a restoration at the end of the 19th century restored the original Romanesque interior, divided by columns with "sesto rialzato" arches, and with an "incavallature" roof supported by transverse arches, as at the basilica of San Zeno. There are two lateral apses in tuff and cotto, and a central apse with two early 14th-century frescoes.

The exterior has alternate bands of tuff and cotto, with small windows. The side-door is dominated by the arch of Cangrande I della Scala, the soberest but most monumental of the family arches. Excavations have found a cemetery near the church, containing fifty 11th-century burials, some aligned north-south, some east-west.

The belltower contains two bells cast during the 17th century and rung in the Veronese syle.

== Burials ==
- Alberto I della Scala
- Cangrande I della Scala
- Mastino II della Scala
- Cansignorio della Scala
- Alberto II della Scala

== Gallery ==
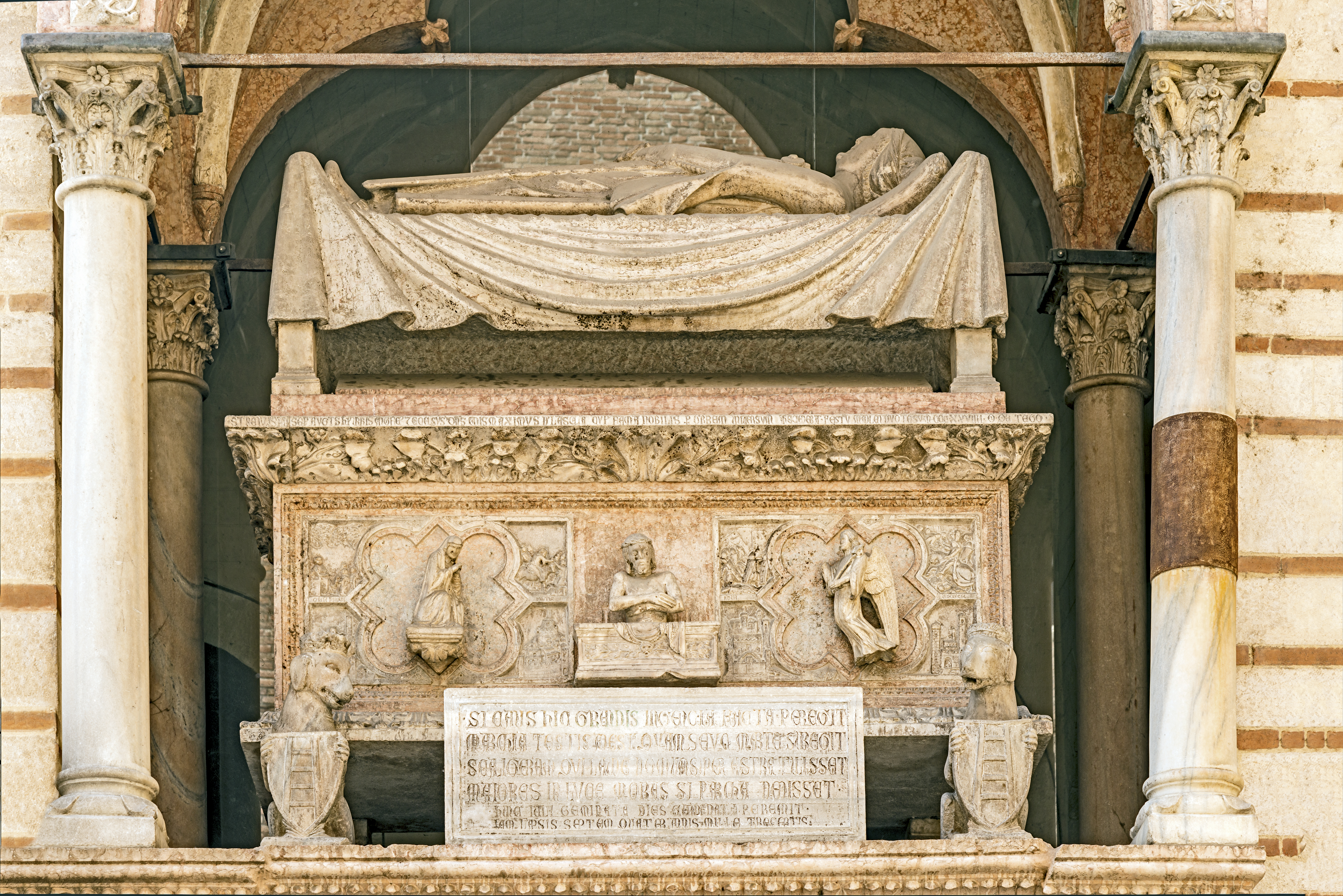
Tomb of Cangrande above the entrance porch.

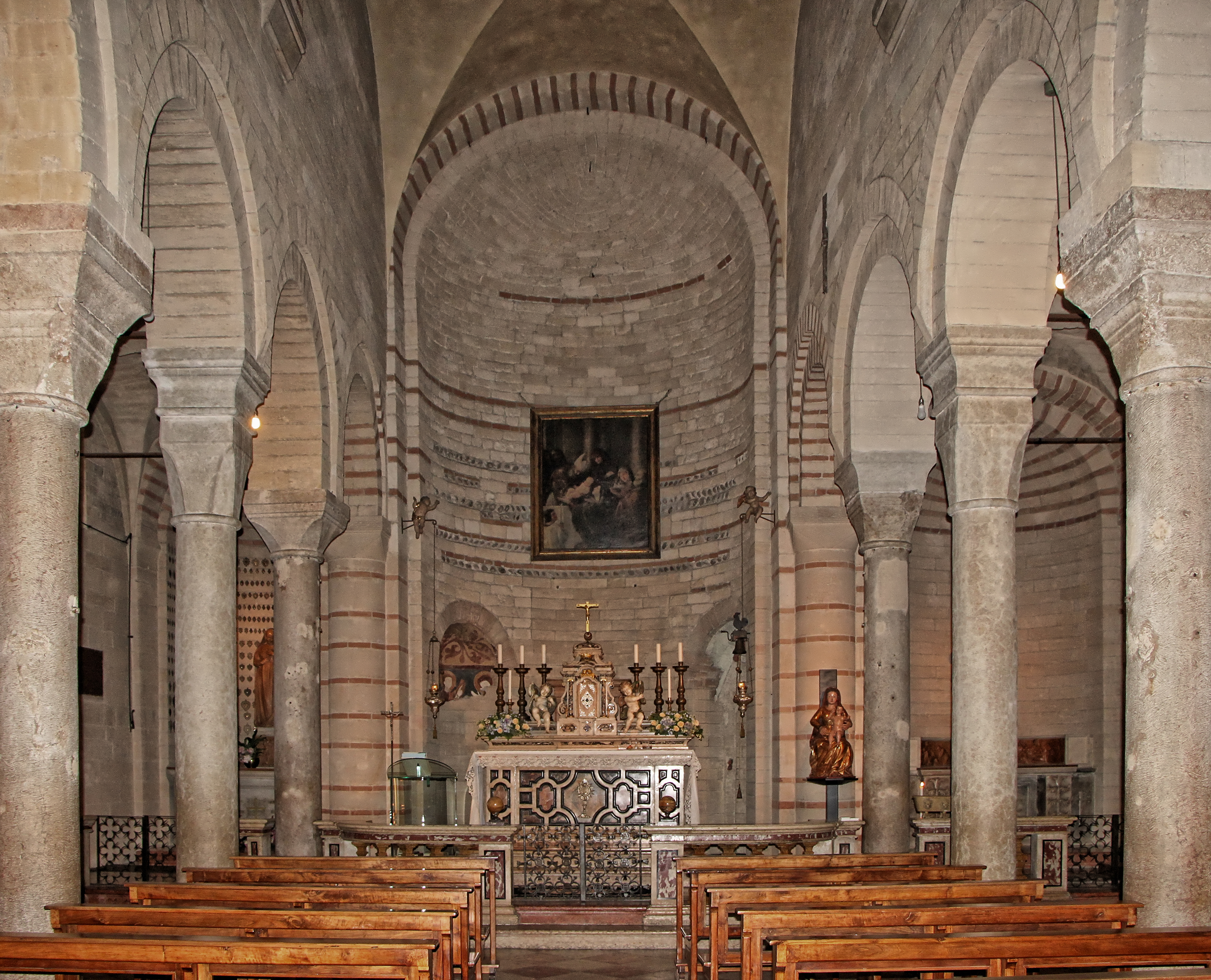
View of the Interior

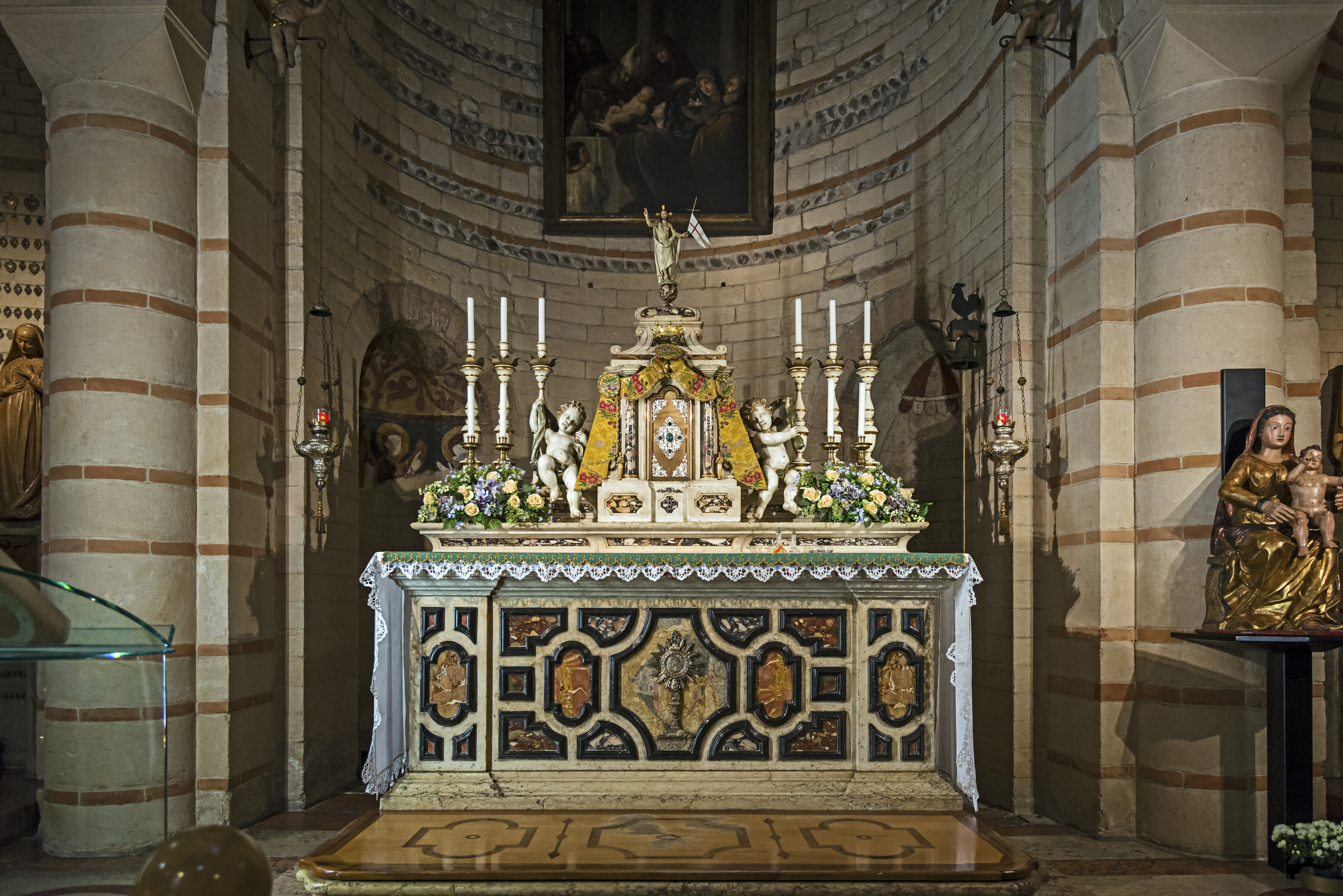
The high altar
