= Brunswick Monument =

Mausoleum in Geneva, Switzerland

Coordinates: 46°12′30.45″N 6°8′57″E

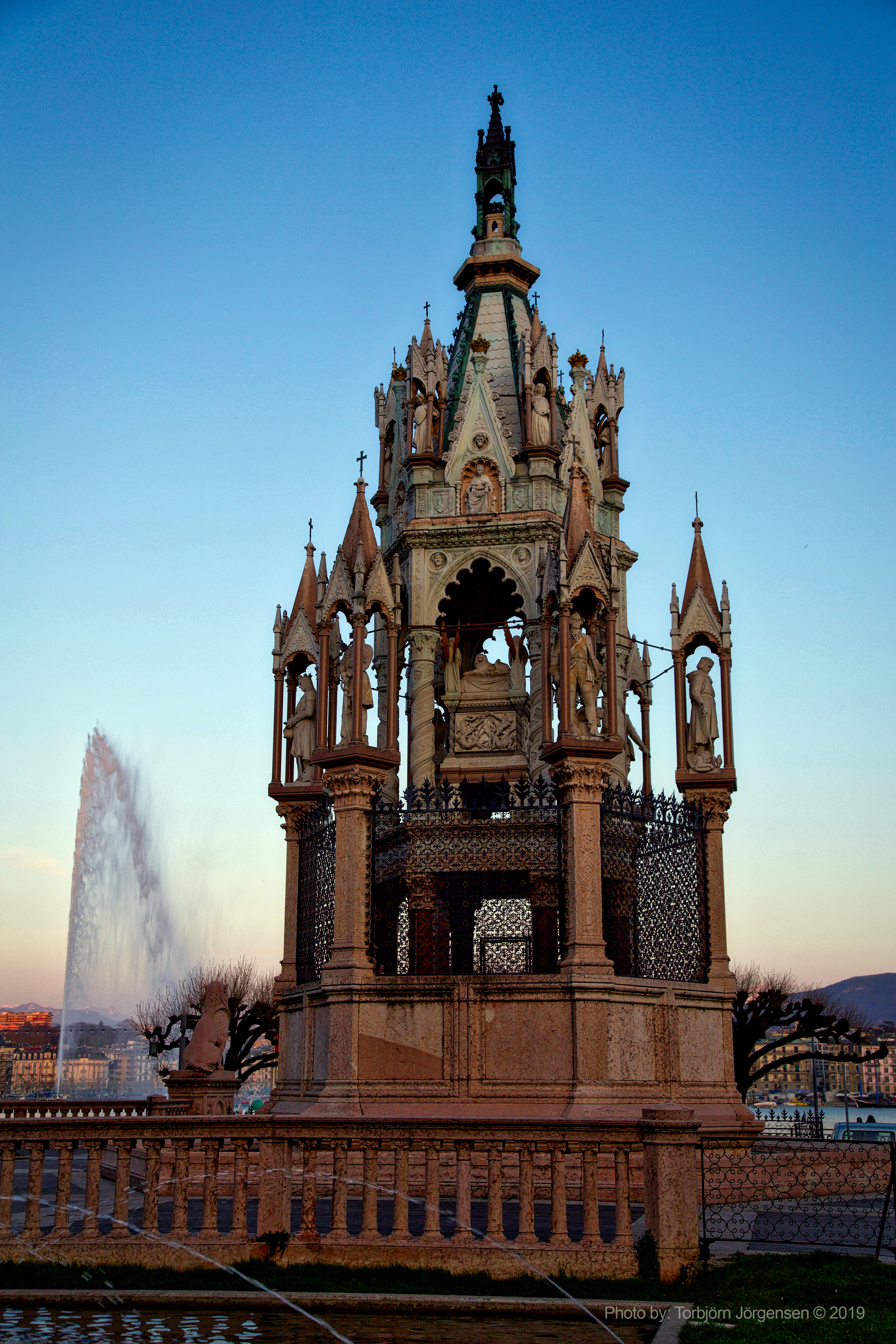
The monument

The Brunswick Monument is a mausoleum built in 1879 in the Jardin des Alpes in Geneva, Switzerland to commemorate the life of Charles II, Duke of Brunswick (1804–1873). He bequeathed his fortune to the city of Geneva in exchange for a monument to be built in his name, specifying that it be a replica of the Scaliger Tombs in Verona, Italy. The Grand Théâtre de Genève, opened in 1879, was built with the legacy.

In his will drawn up on 5 March 1871, Charles left his entire estate to the city of Geneva with a single stipulation; that a mausoleum be built for him in Geneva "in a prominent position and worthy", that it should feature statues of his father, Frederick William, and his grandfather, Charles William Ferdinand, and that it should imitate the style of the 14th century Scaliger Tombs in Verona, particularly that of Cansignorio della Scala. Accordingly, a design was chosen by the Swiss architect Jean Franel. Sited on the Quai du Mont-Blanc, it is built in three storeys of white marble with a hexagonal canopy over a sarcophagus bearing a recumbent figure of the duke. At the projecting corners are marble statues of six notable ancestors of the House of Guelph by various sculptors, and a bronze equestrian statue of Duke William by the French sculptor Auguste Cain was originally mounted at the top of the spire. The monument stands on a platform 65 meters long and 25 meters wide and is guarded by marble chimeras and lions, also by Cain.

The monument was unveiled on 14 October 1879; however, earthquake damage resulted in the removal of the equestrian statue to an adjacent plinth in 1883 and the top of the spire was rebuilt with a crown in 1890. The duke's estate amounted to 24 million Swiss Francs, two million of which were expended on the monument, the remainder was spent on a number of new public buildings, for example the Grand Théâtre.
