= Scaliger Tombs =

Funerary monuments in Verona, Italy

Coordinates: 45°26.61862′N 10°59.93565′E

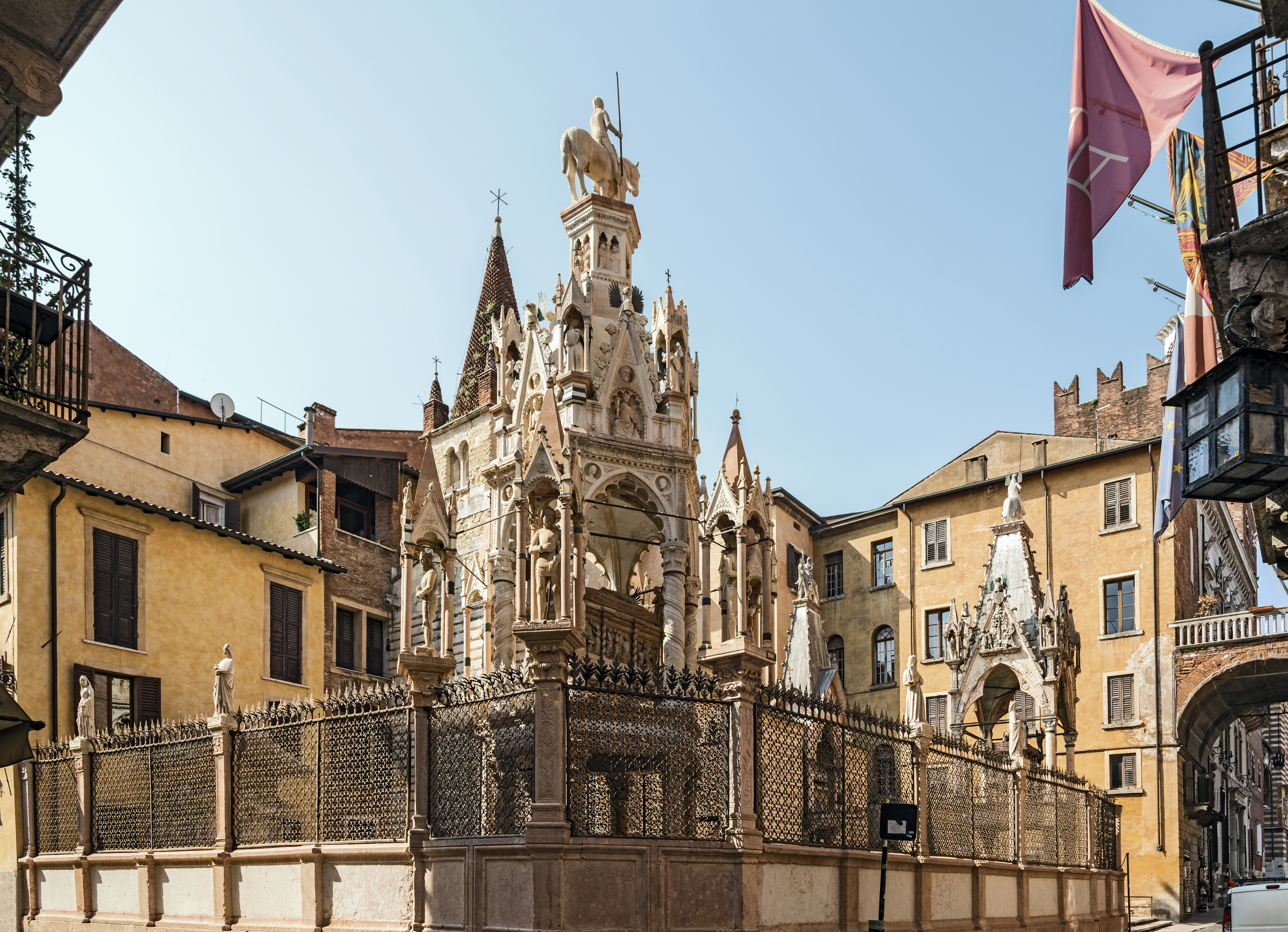
View of the Scaliger Tombs. In the foreground, the tomb of Cansignorio Mastino II and that of Mastino II behind.

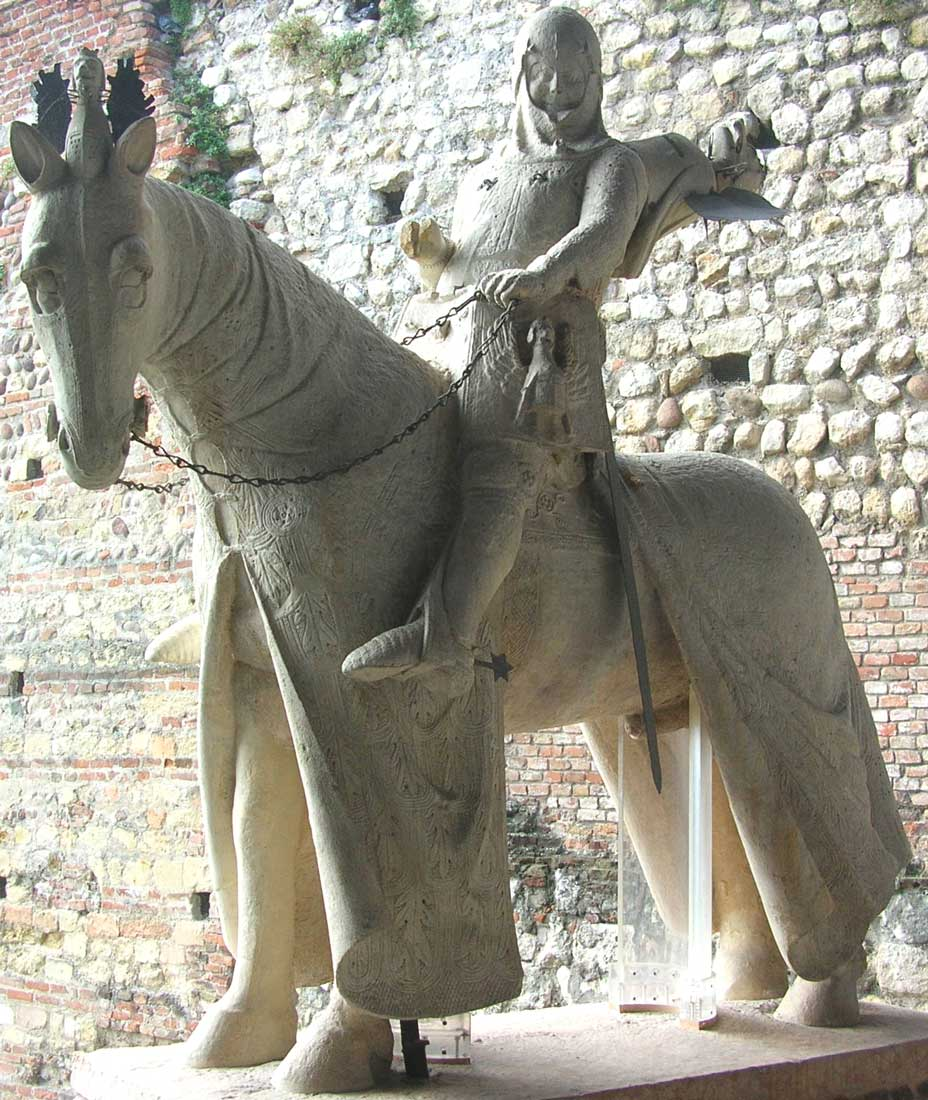
The original statue of Cangrande I at the Castelvecchio Museum in Verona, moved from its original position at the tomb of Cangrande I in 1909, where a copy now stands in its place. The statue's current position was selected by architect Carlo Scarpa.

The Scaliger Tombs (Italian: Arche scaligere) is a group of five Gothic funerary monuments in Verona, Italy, celebrating the Scaliger family, who ruled in Verona from the 13th to the late 14th century.

The tombs are located in a court outside the church of Santa Maria Antica, separated from the street by a wall with iron grilles. Built in Gothic style, they are a series of tombs, mostly freestanding open tabernacle-like structures rising high above the ground, with a sarcophagus surmounted by an elaborate baldachin, topped by a statue of the deceased, mounted and wearing armour. According to the French historian Georges Duby, they are one of the most outstanding examples of Gothic art.

== Description ==
The tombs are placed within an enclosure of wrought iron grilles decorated with a stair motif, referring to the name of the Della Scala family, meaning "of the stairs" in Italian. Although these tombs are located in a crowded area in the city, they have stood for five hundred years and counting. The stone pillars of the enclosure have statues of saints. The tombs are those of the following notable members of the Scaliger dynasty:

- Cangrande I. This was the first tomb built, in the 14th century, according to the will of the deceased, the most famous Scaliger ruler of the city. The designer was the architect of the church of Sant'Anastasia, who planned it in the shape of a Gothic tabernacle, supported by richly harnessed dogs (Cangrande meaning "Big dog" in Italian). Unlike the later tabernacles, it is built out from the church wall, over a doorway, rather than being free-standing. On the sarcophagus lies a recumbent effigy statue of the lord, characterized by an unusual smile. The sarcophagus is decorated on each side by high reliefs with religious themes and low reliefs with military themes. On the summit of the baldachin is an equestrian statue of Cangrande, now replaced by a copy (the original is in the museum of Castelvecchio).
- Mastino II. Begun in 1345, this tomb was modified during its construction. It was originally painted and gilt, and is enclosed by a railing with four statues of the Virtues at the corners. The faces of the funerary urn are decorated by religious motifs; on the sepulchre cover lies again the deceased's statue, guarded by two angels. The baldachin has religious themes sculpted on the pediment, and is also surmounted by an equestrian statue of Mastino II.
- Cansignorio. Dating from 1375, and the most richly decorated. It was designed by Bonino da Campione, and has sculptures portraying warrior saints, Gospel figures, the Virtues and the Apostles, and a large equestrian statue of Cansignorio.
- Alberto II. Unlike the others, it has no baldachin but only a sarcophagus, though richly decorated. It dates from 1301.
- Giovanni. This monument is built into the wall of the church. It was finished in 1359 by Andriolo de' Santi, and until 1400 it was located in the church of San Fermo Maggiore, before being moved to join the others.

The tomb of Cansignorio della Scala served as the inspiration behind the funerary monument of Charles II, Duke of Brunswick (completed in 1879) in Geneva, Switzerland.

== Gallery ==
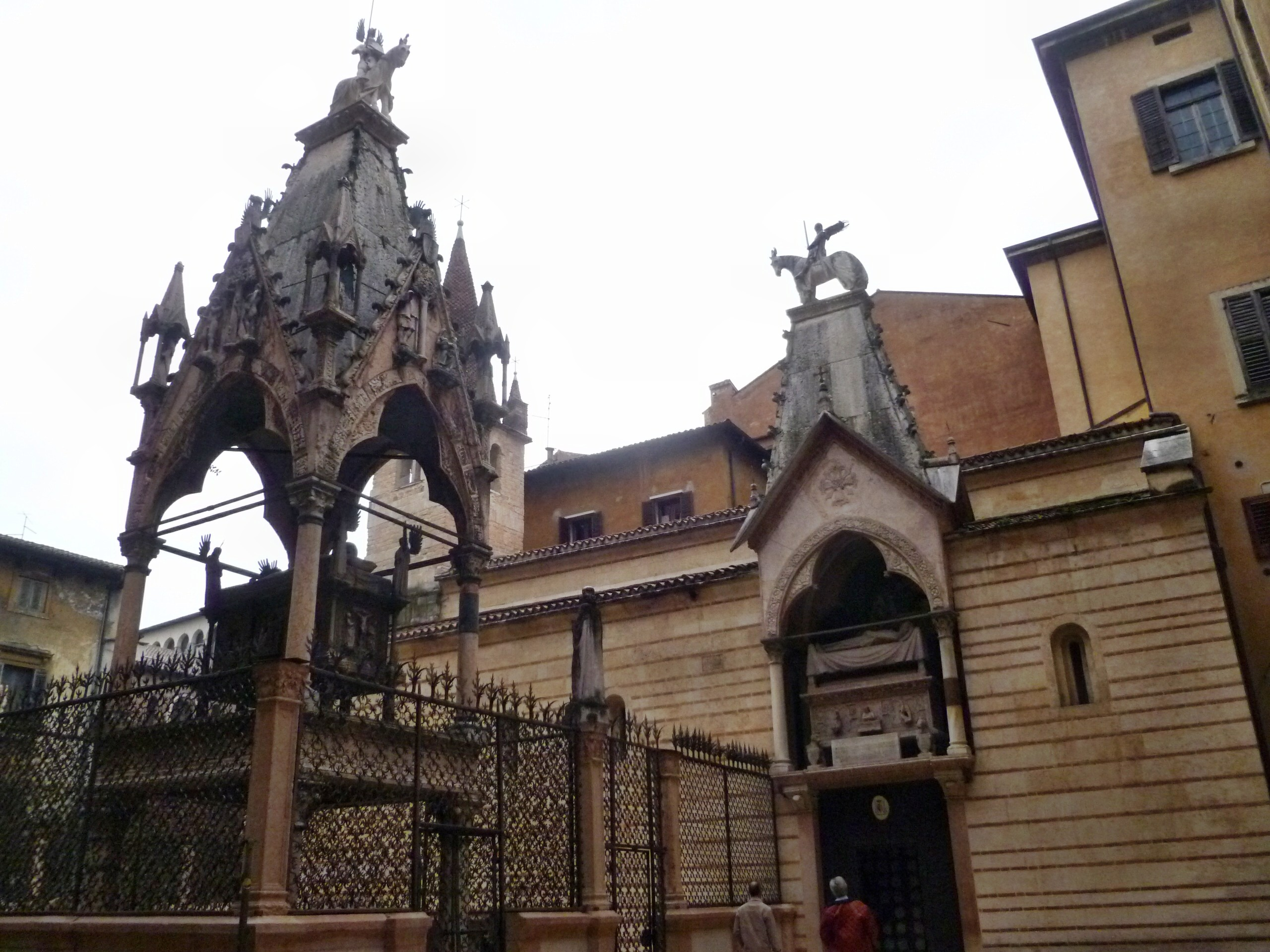
Mastino II's tomb on the left, Cangrande I's to the right.

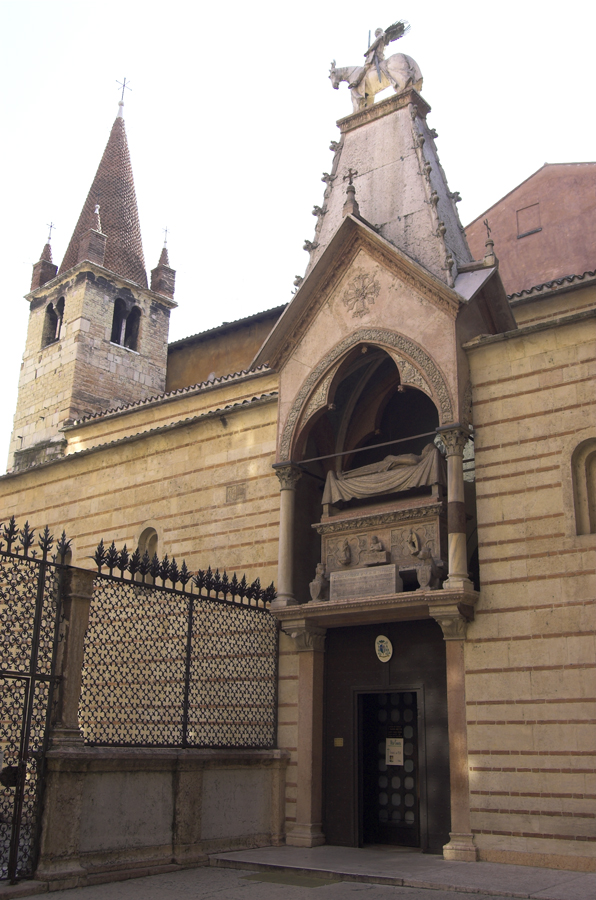
Tomb of Cangrande I

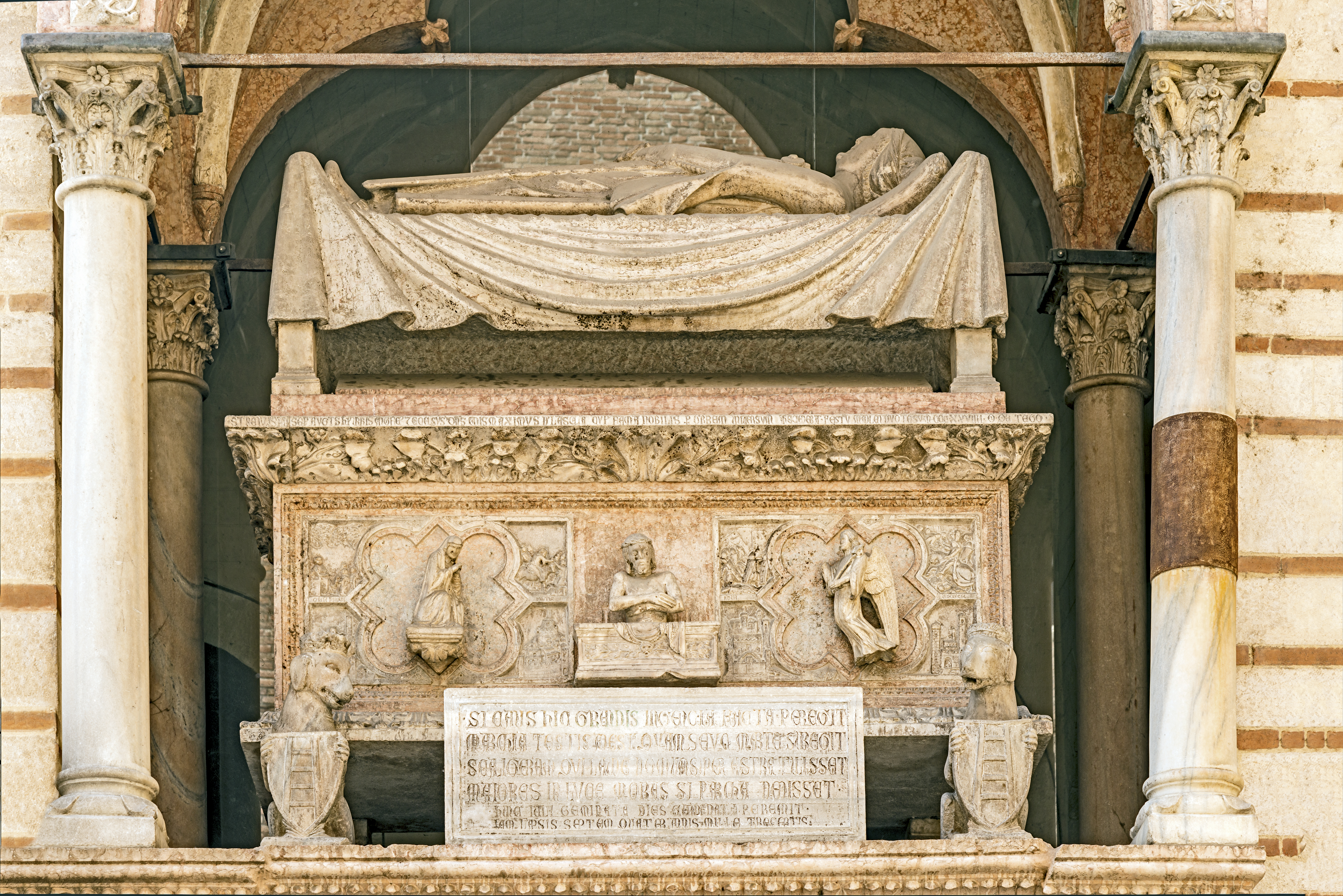
Sarcophagus and effigy of Cangrande I

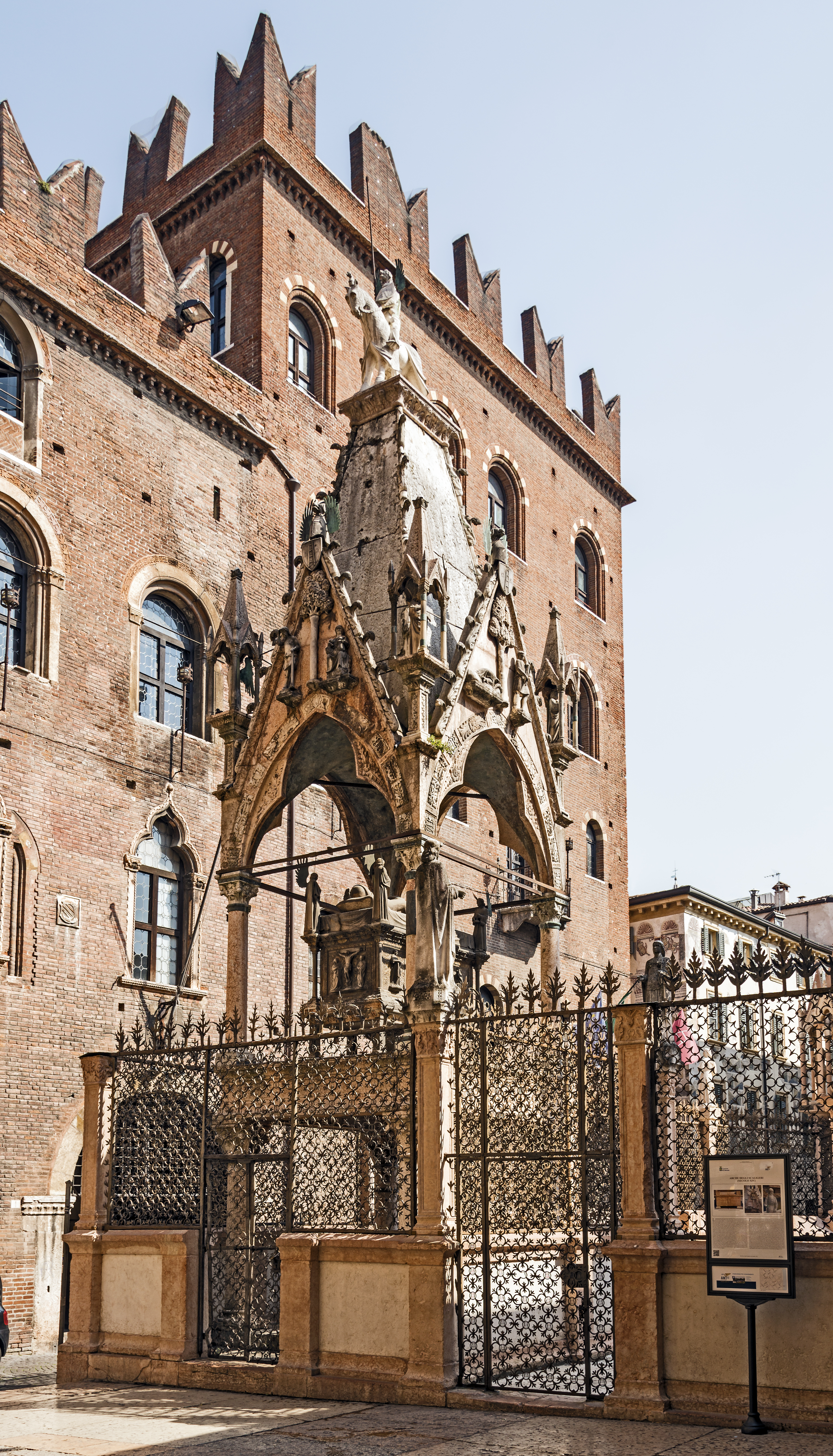
Tomb of Mastino II, from 1345

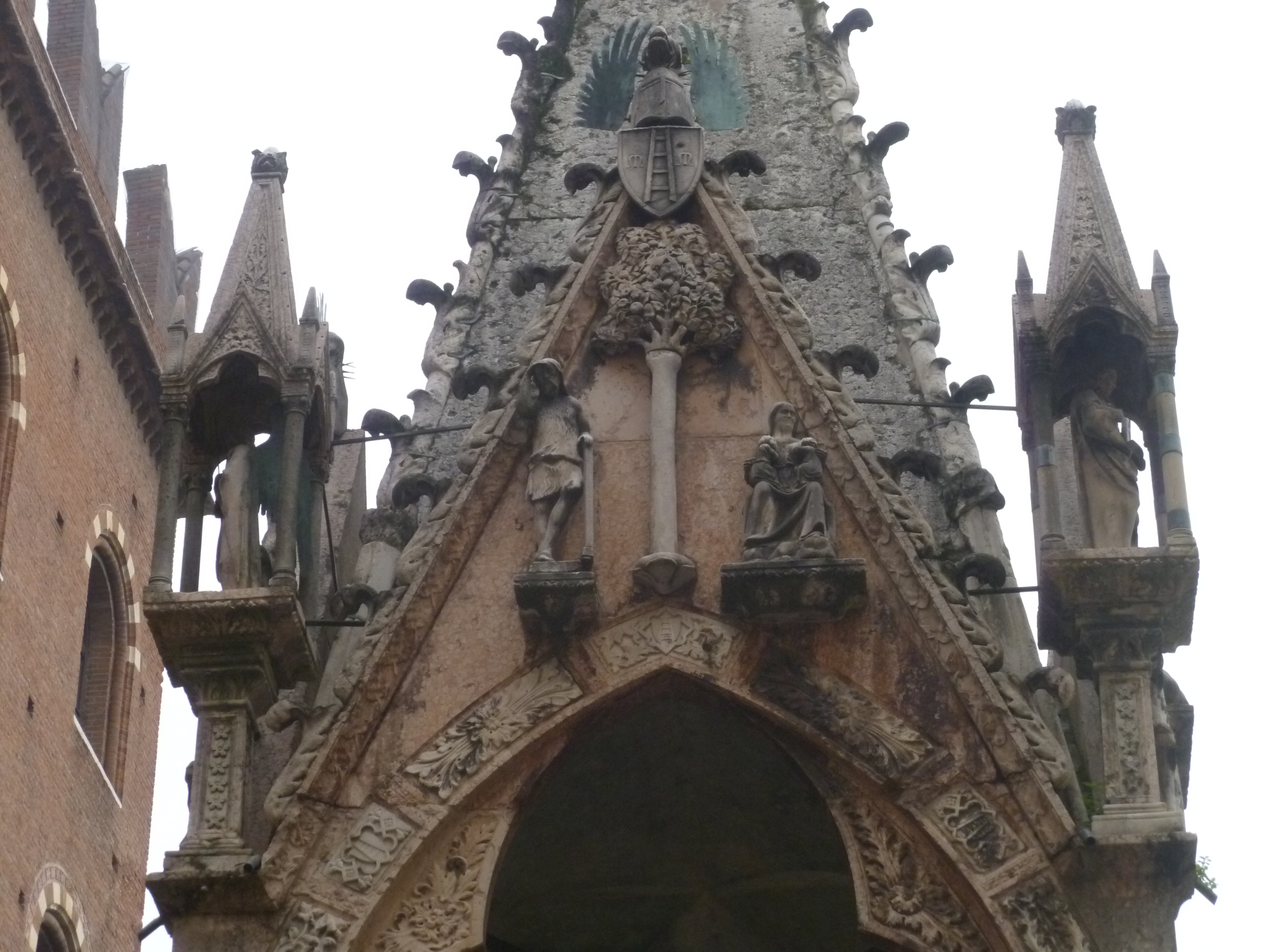
Detail of Mastino's tomb

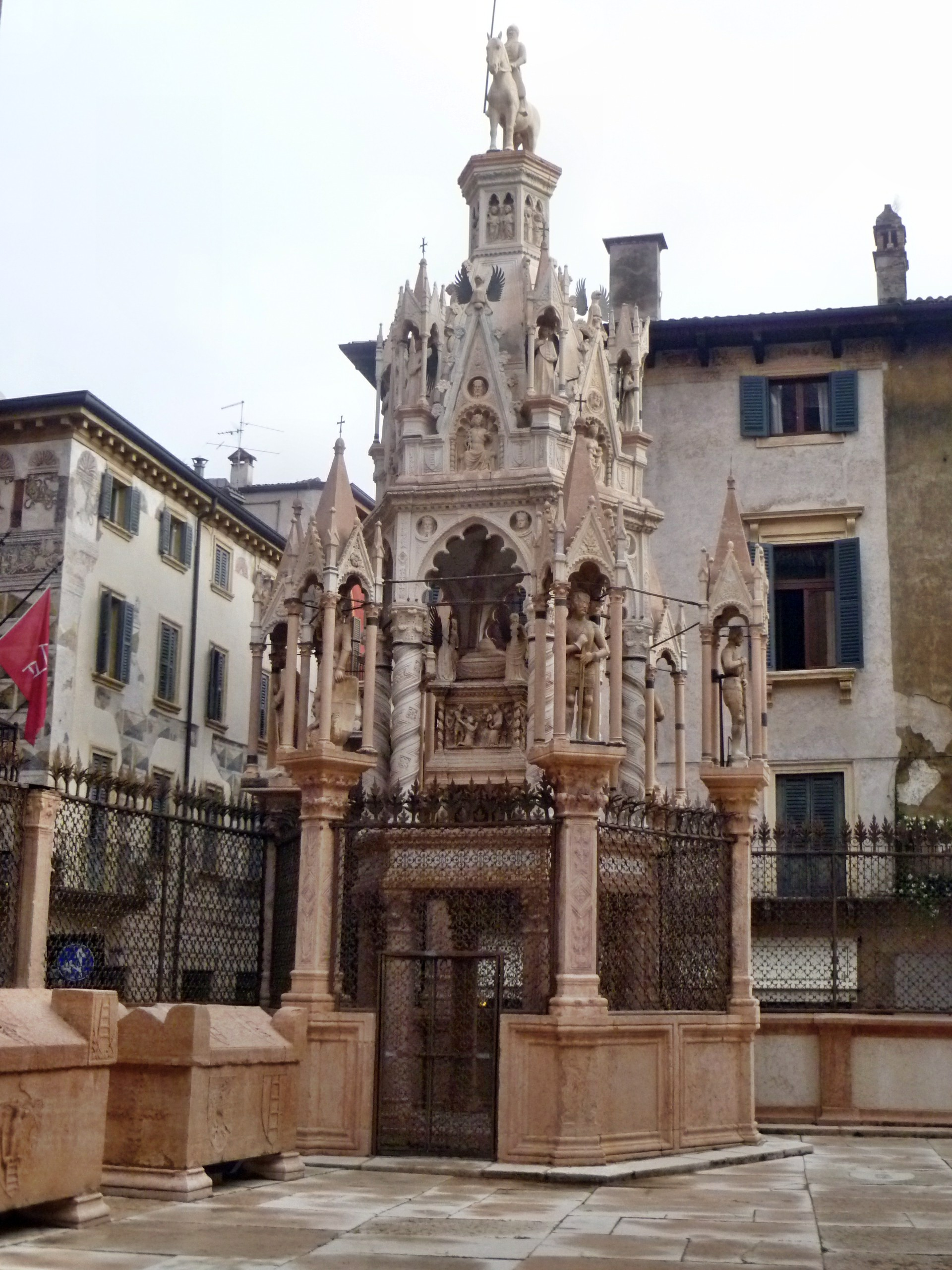
Tomb of Cansignorio della Scala, 1375

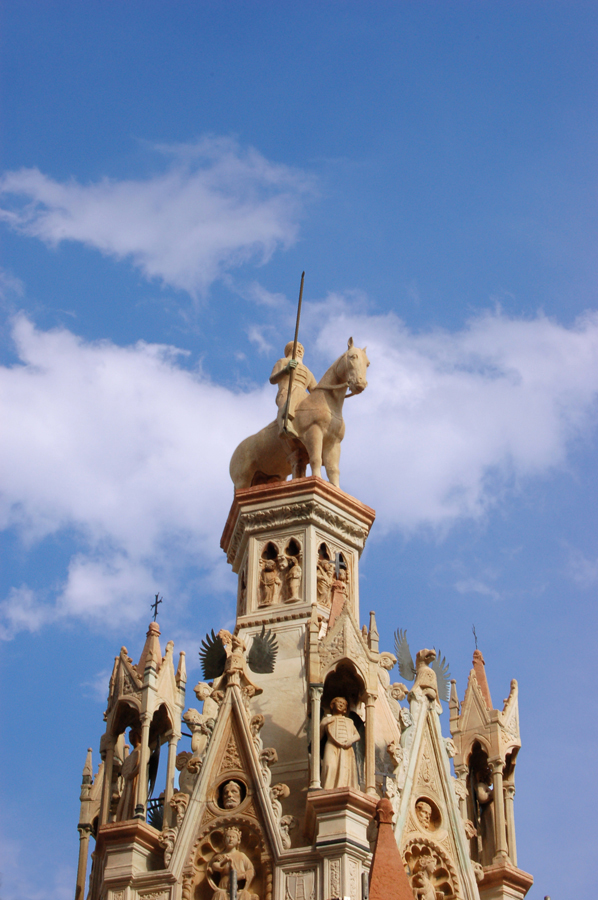
Top of Cansignorio's tomb

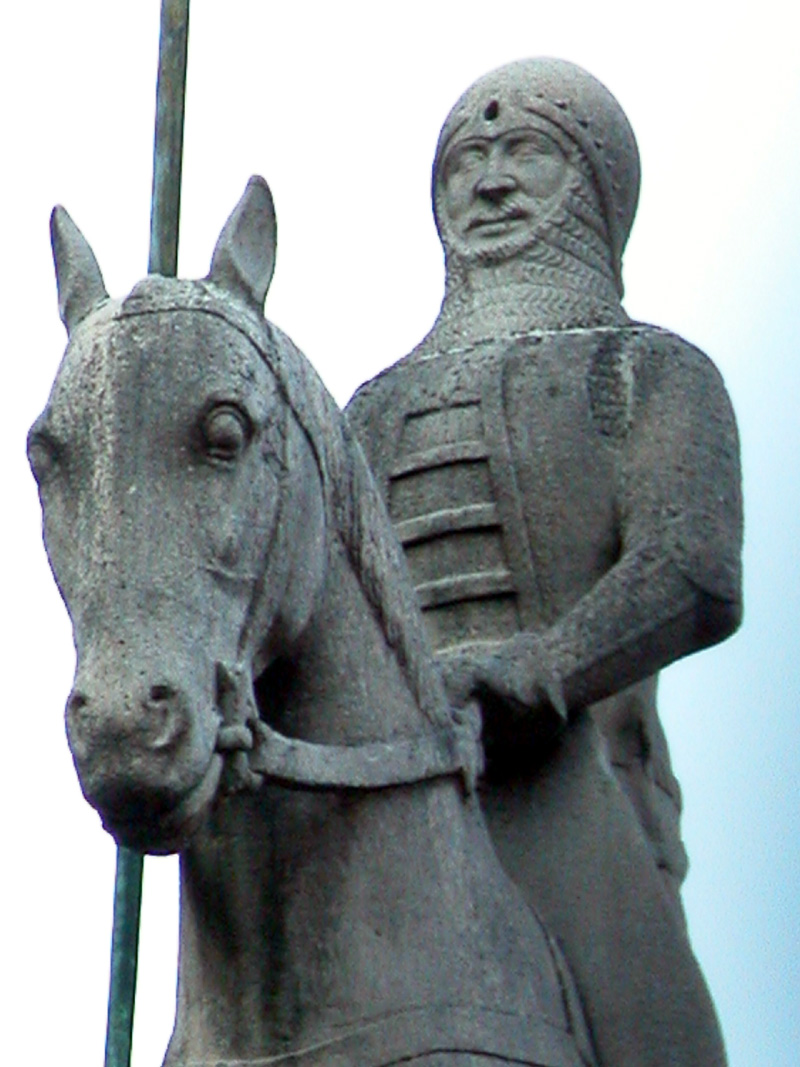
Detail of Cansignorio's statue

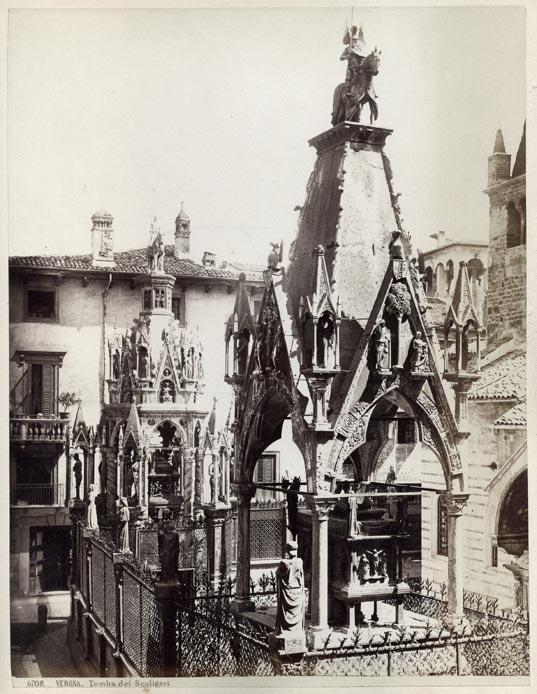
Pre-1914 photograph

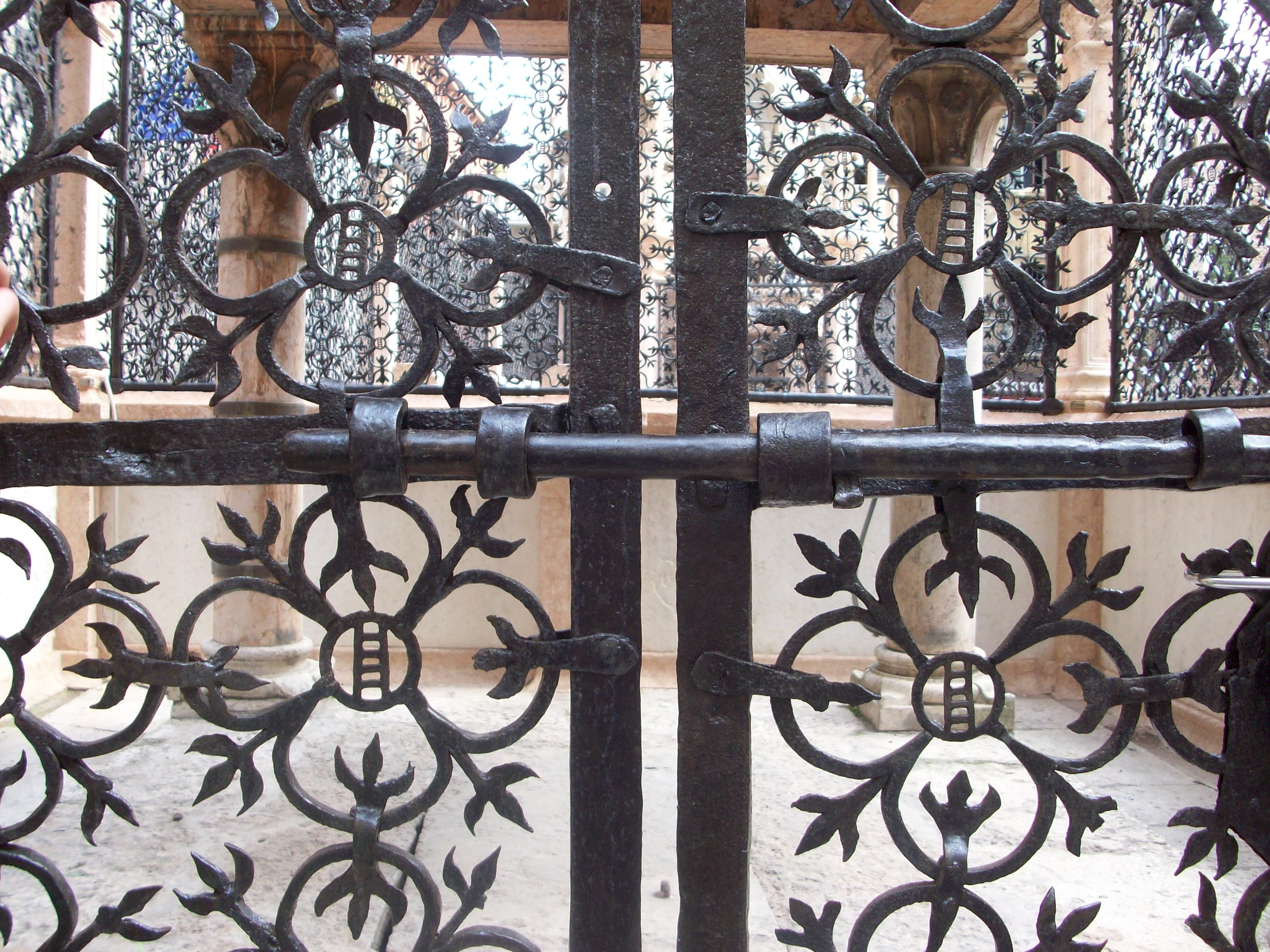
Detail of the grilles

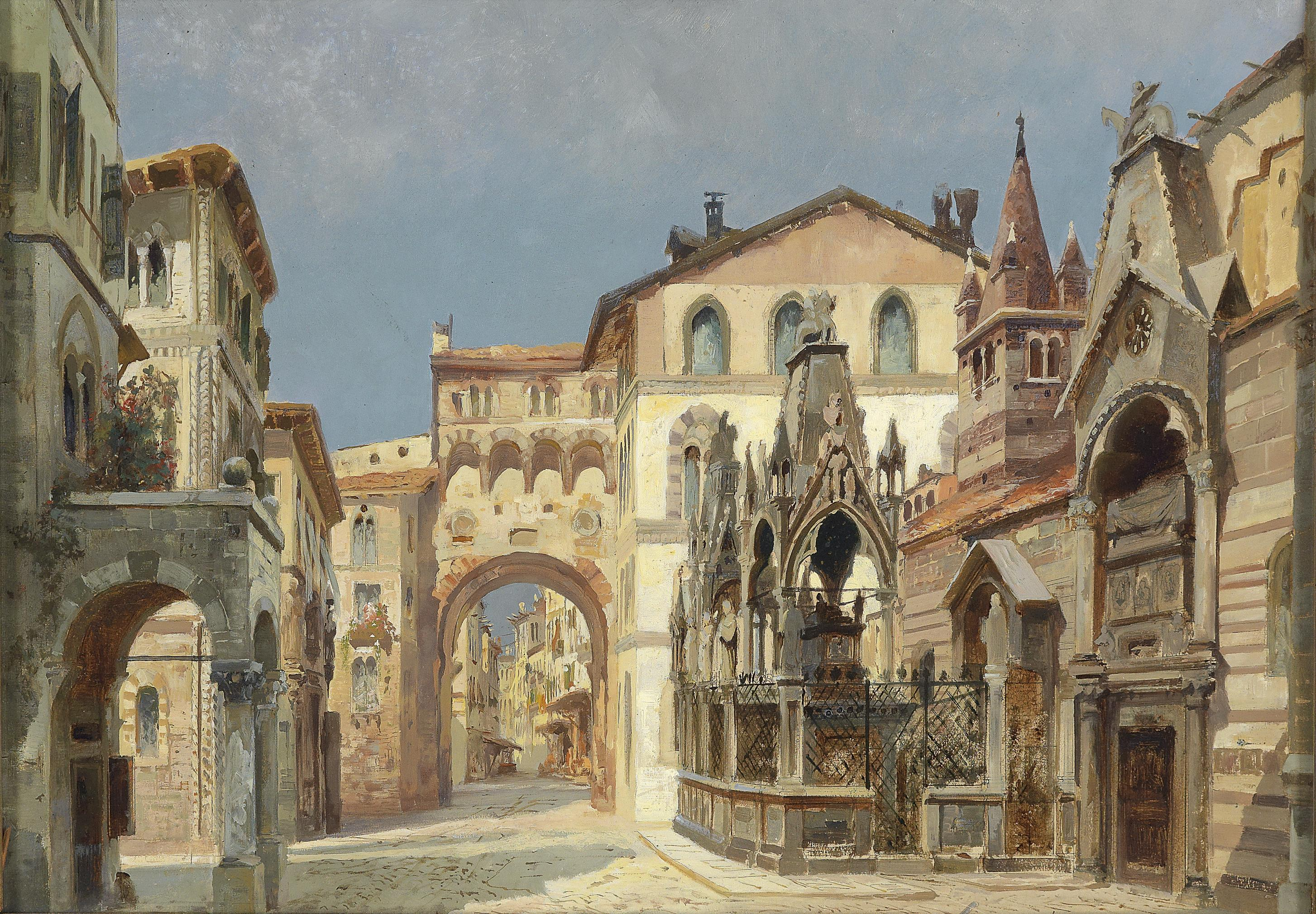
Watercolour of the tombs and setting, by 1920

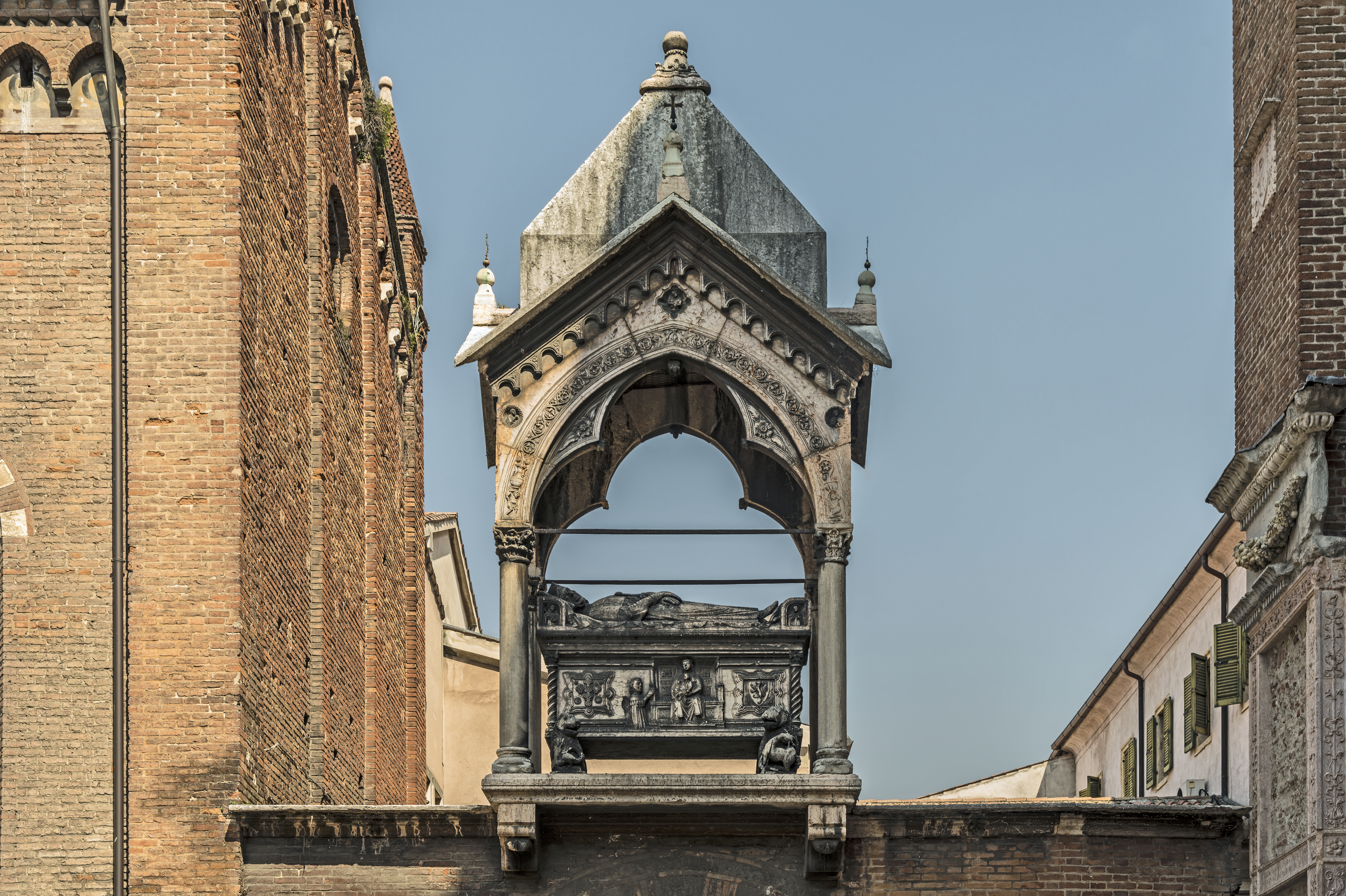
Tomb of Guglielmo da Castelbarco, nearby
