= Separating arch =

Arch found in hall churches

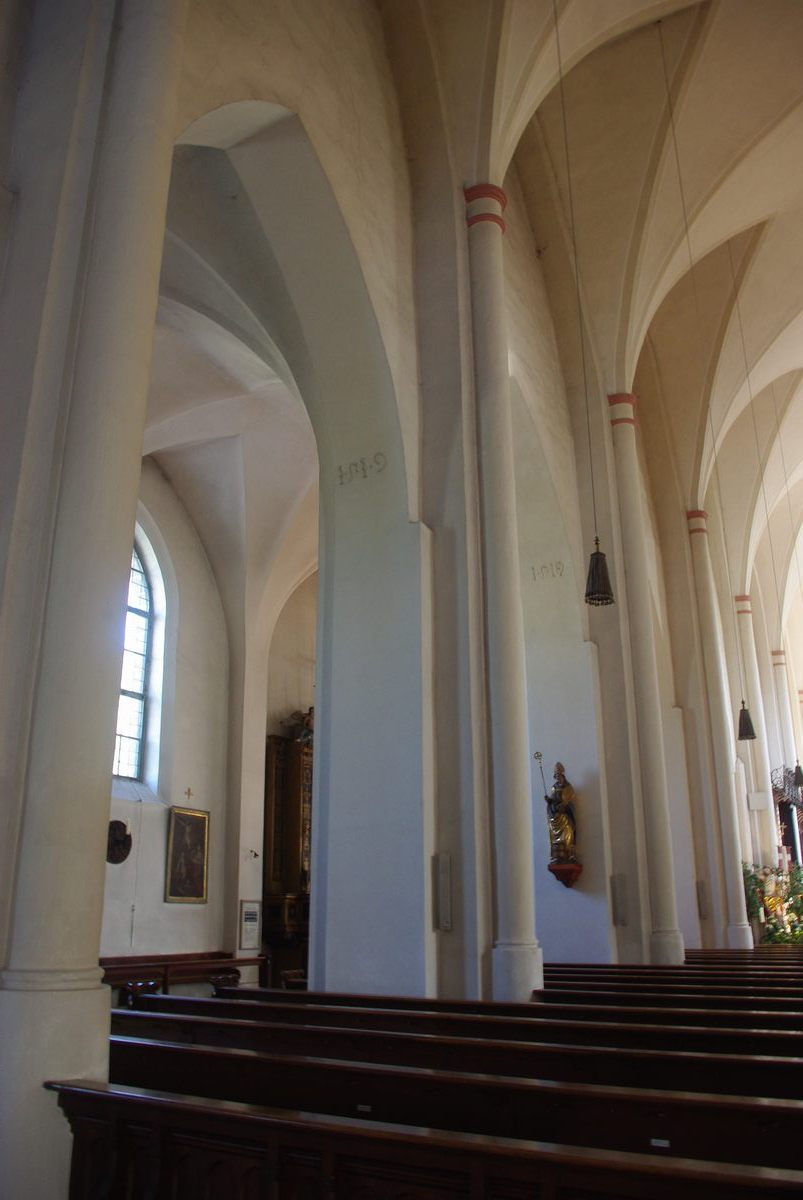
A separative arch in the St. Zeno church after the 1518–1520 gothicisation

A separating arch is an arch, which, as arcade, separates the nave of a church from the side aisle, or an arch between two adjacent side aisles. It is found mainly in hall churches. A separating arch can be replaced constructively or decoratively emphasised by a vault rib. In this case one speaks - instead of an arcade arch - also of a separating arch.

== Separating arches as elements of vaults and wall division ==
Separating arches delimit a bay in the longitudinal direction. A pair of transverse arches and a pair of separating arches result in a vault. With the belt arches as well as the pillars or columns at the four corners, the segmental arches form a vault field as the basic element of a vault.

A wall supported by a separating arch is called a separating wall.
