= Transverse arch =

Architectural element

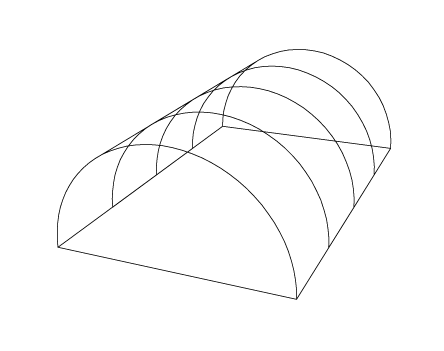
A series of arches across the tunnel vault

In architecture, a transverse arch is an arch in a vaulted building that goes across the barrel vault. A series of transverse arches sitting on tops of the columns on the sides of the nave was typical in the churches of Romanesque architecture (common since Carolingian times). By analogy, the term is also used to describe the transverse ribs of a groined vault and for any crosswise arch in modern buildings. An arc that goes in transverse direction, but carries an exposed wall on top, dividing the vault into compartments, is called a diaphragm arch.

In the historical buildings, the transverse arches provide support for purlins and roof ridge beams. They also subdivide the nave into bays. The springings of the arch are typically pinned to supports using wooden or steel ties, but the bulk of lateral thrust is terminated in the abutments.

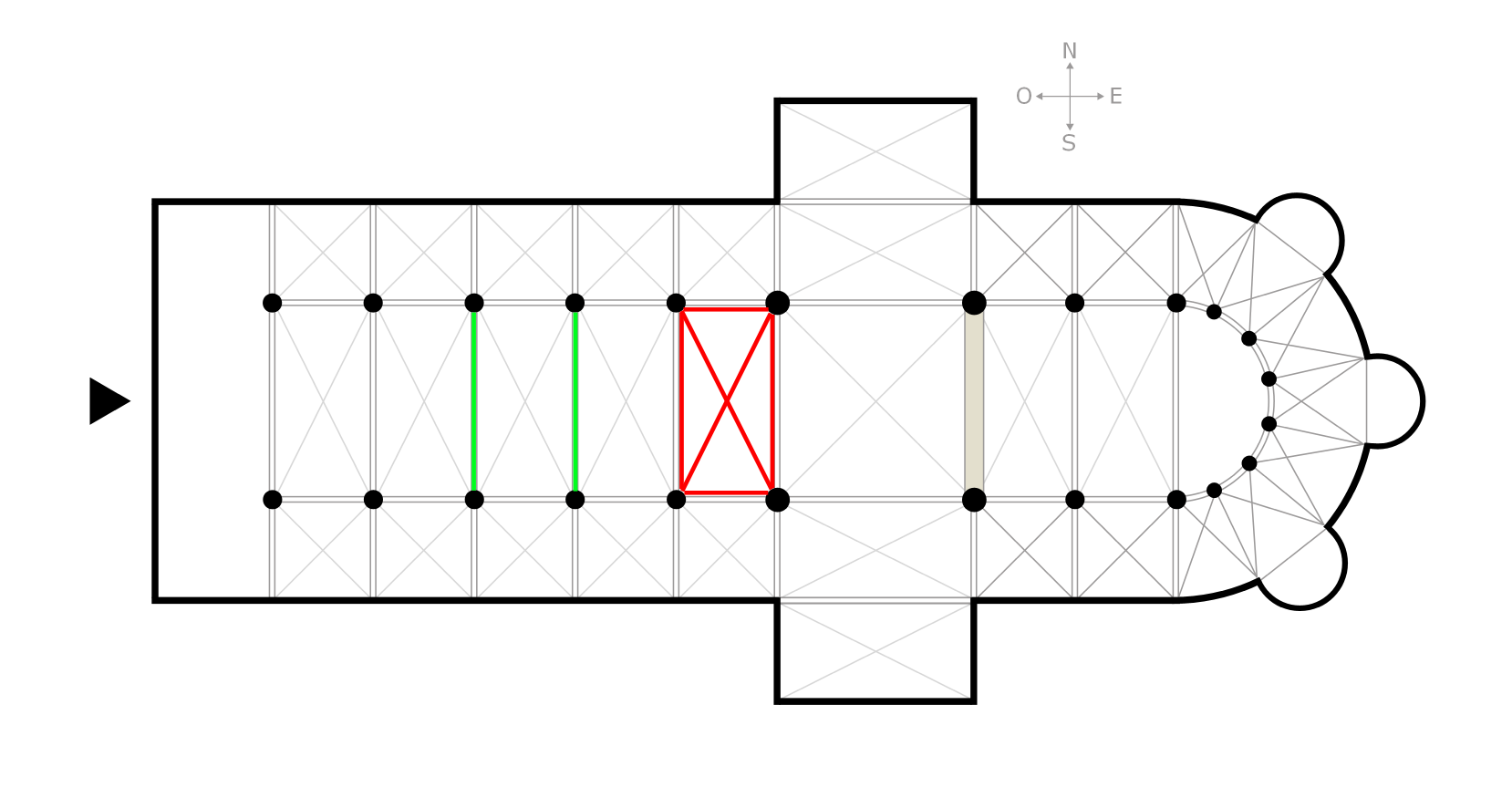
The transverse arches are highlighted in green on a plan of a church

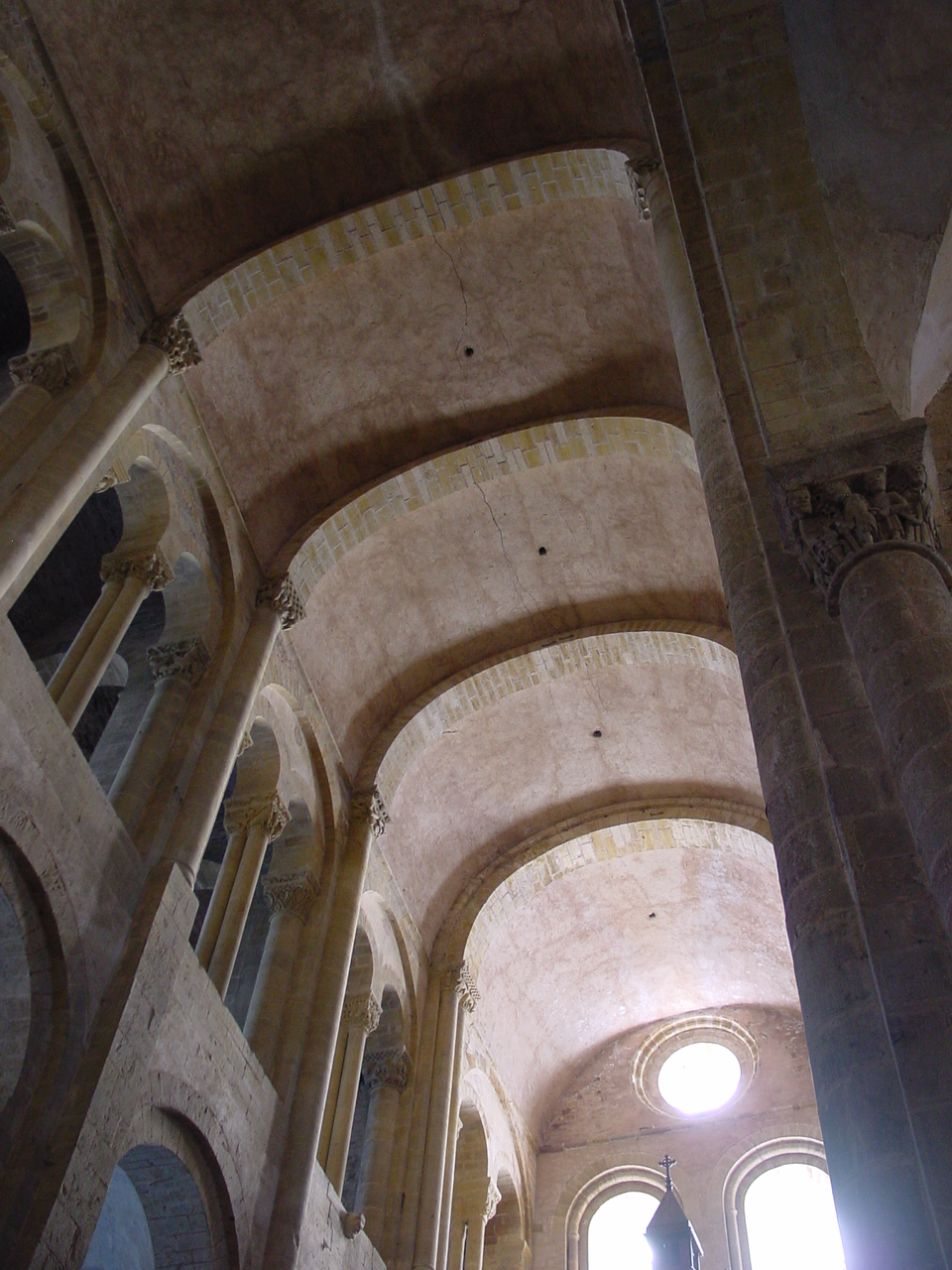
Transverse arches in Abbey Church of Sainte-Foy

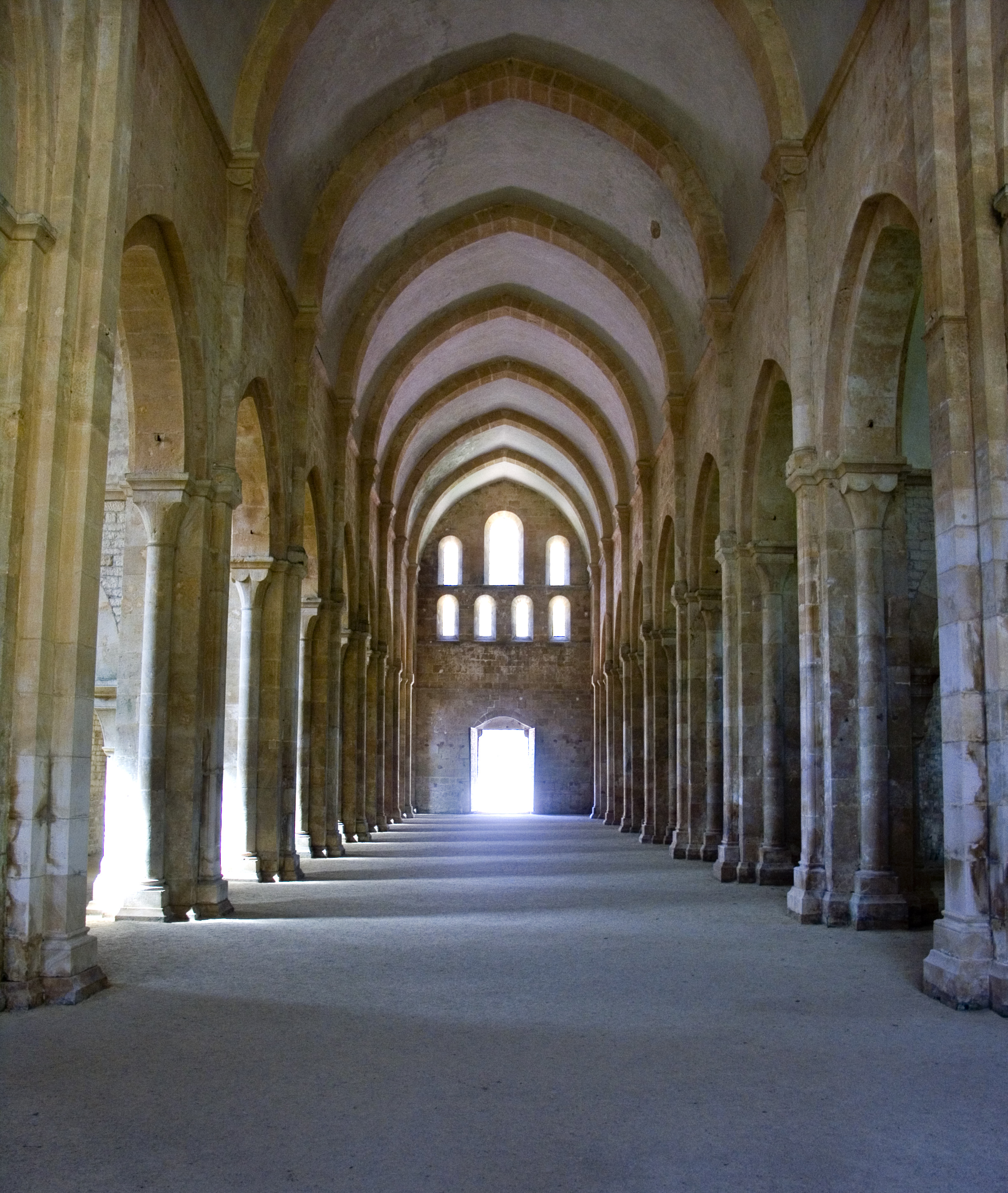
Pointed barrel vault with transverse arches (Abbey of Fontenay)

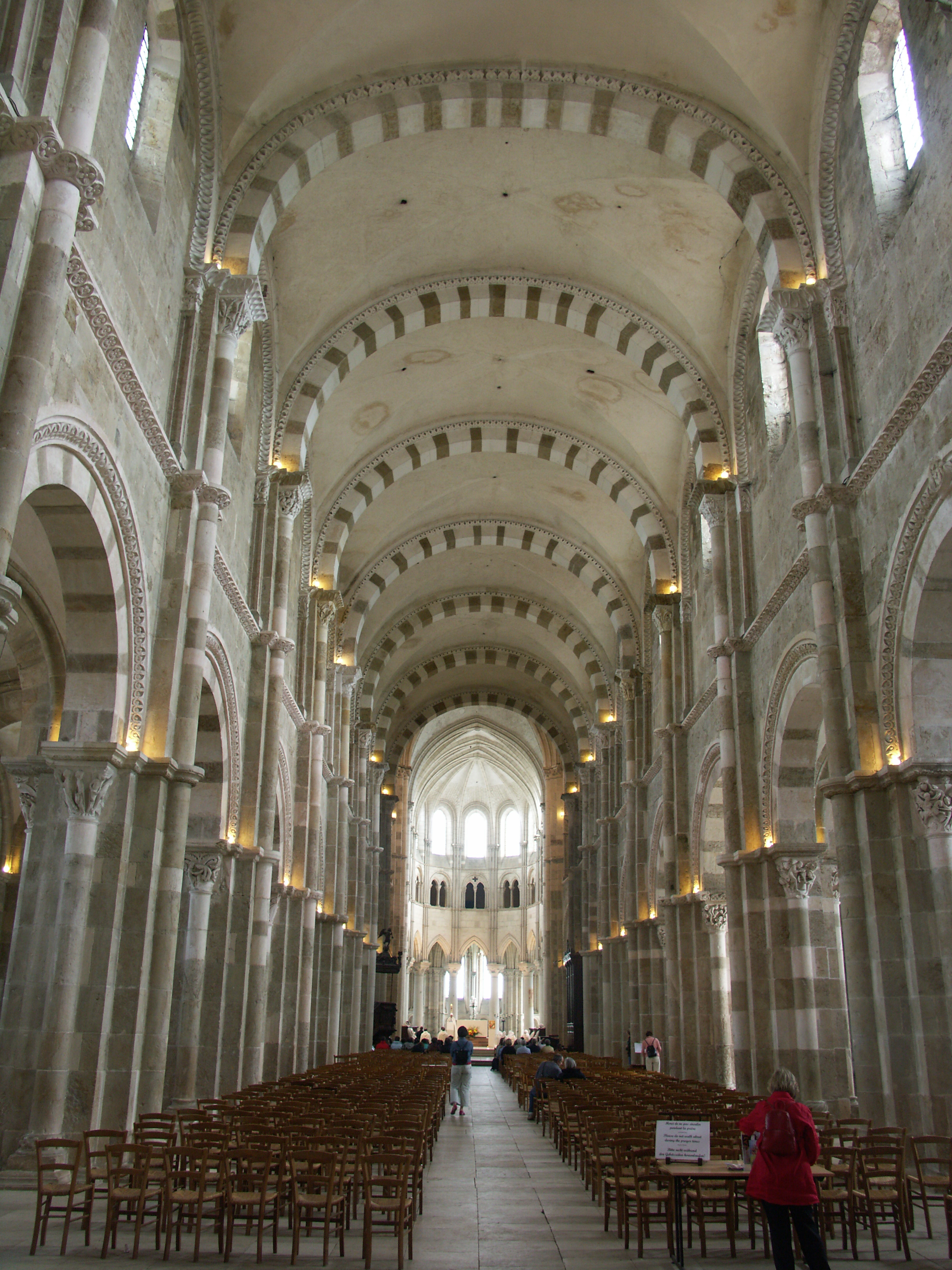
Groined vault with transverse arches

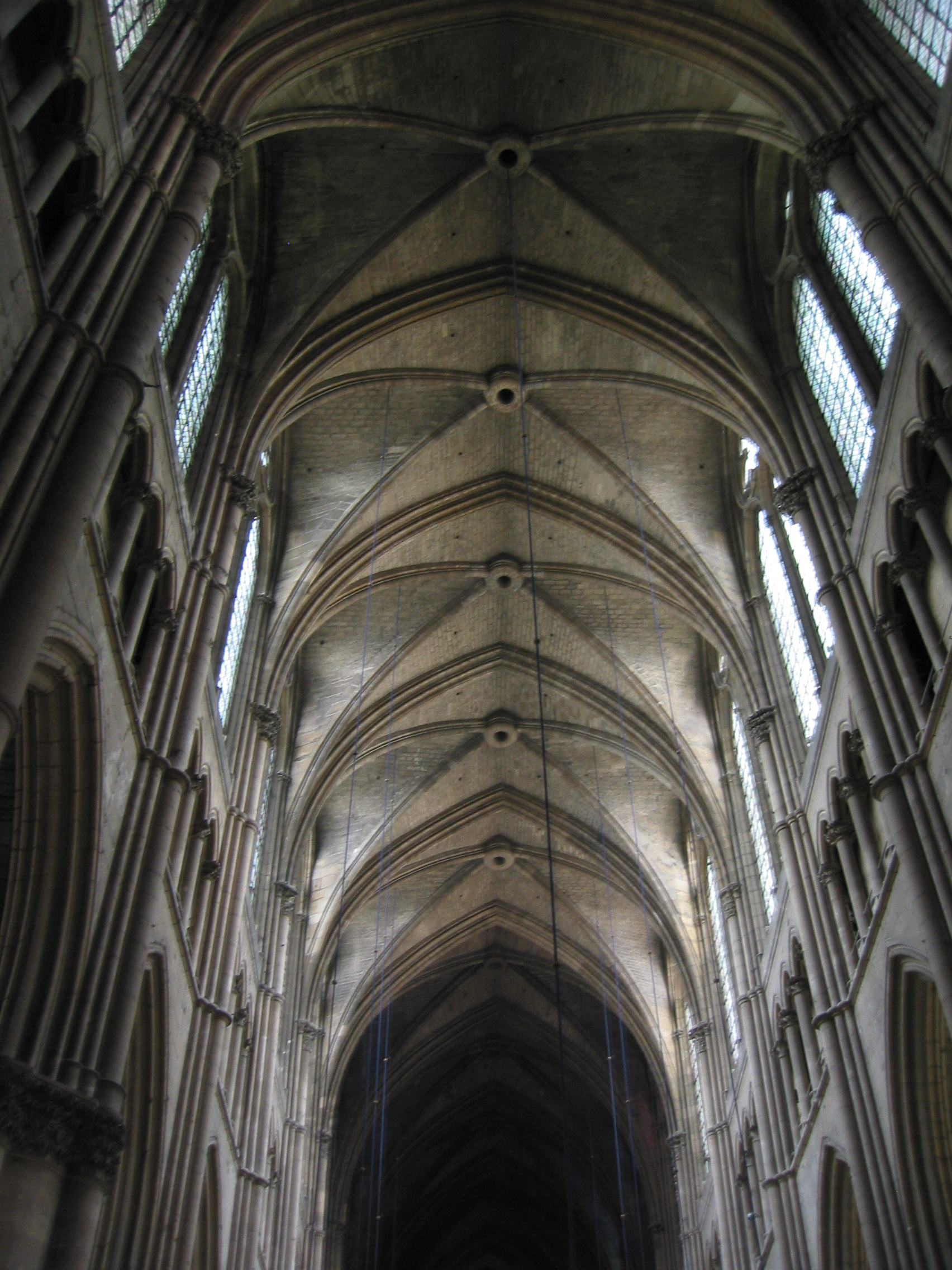
Cross-ribbed vault with transverse arches

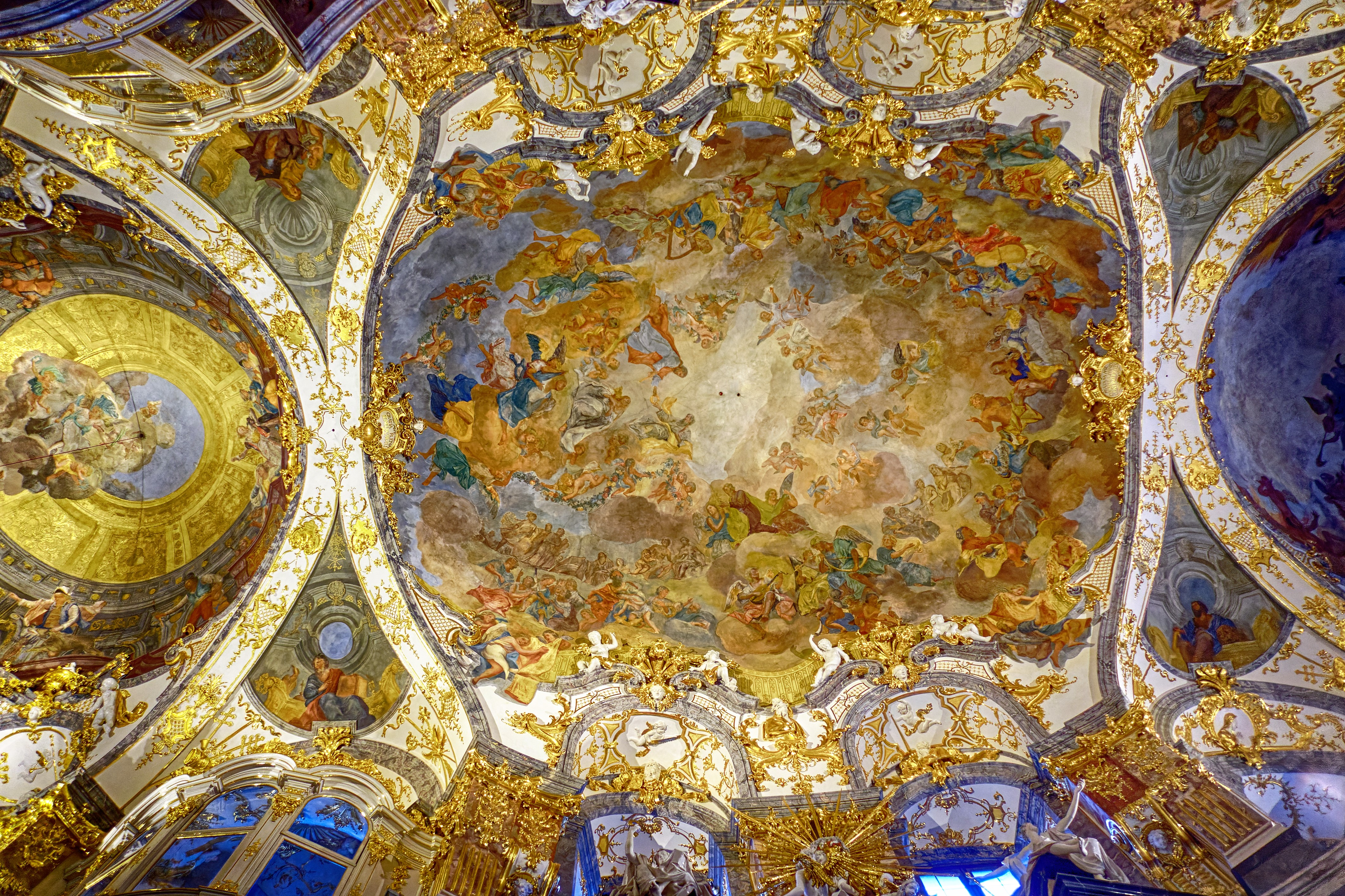
Baroque vault with curved transverse arches (church at the Würzburg Residence)

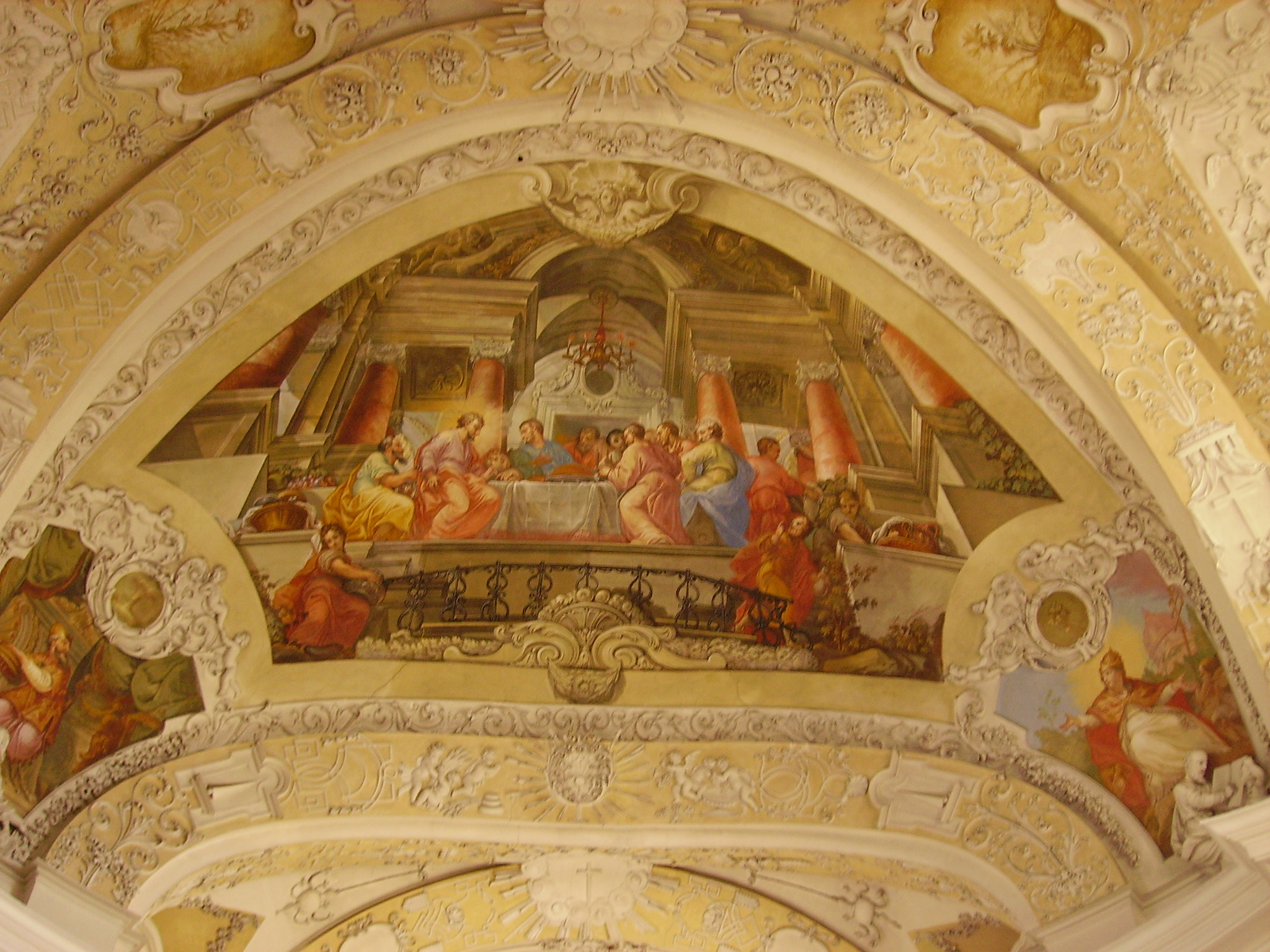
Baroque vault with curved transverse arches (church at the Banz Abbey)

== See also ==
- Separating arch, an arch parallel to the sides of the nave

== Sources ==
- Bolis, Valentino; Preti, Marco; Marini, Alessandra; Giuriani, Ezio (2017). "Experimental cyclic and dynamic in-plane rocking response of a masonry transverse arch typical of historical churches". Engineering Structures. 147: 285–296. doi:10.1016/j.engstruct.2017.05.058.
- Davies, N.; Jokiniemi, E. (2008). "transverse arch". Dictionary of Architecture and Building Construction. Elsevier/Architectural Press. p. 391. ISBN 978-0-7506-8502-3.
- Giuriani, Ezio; Marini, Alessandra; Porteri, Claudia; Preti, Marco (2009-04-28). "Seismic Vulnerability for Churches in Association with Transverse Arch Rocking". International Journal of Architectural Heritage. 3 (3): 212–234. doi:10.1080/15583050802400240. ISSN 1558-3058.
- Hourihane, C. (2012). "Arch". The Grove Encyclopedia of Medieval Art and Architecture. Vol. 1. Oxford University Press. pp. 129–134. ISBN 978-0-19-539536-5.
