= Vertical support =

Member that transfers gravitational loads downward

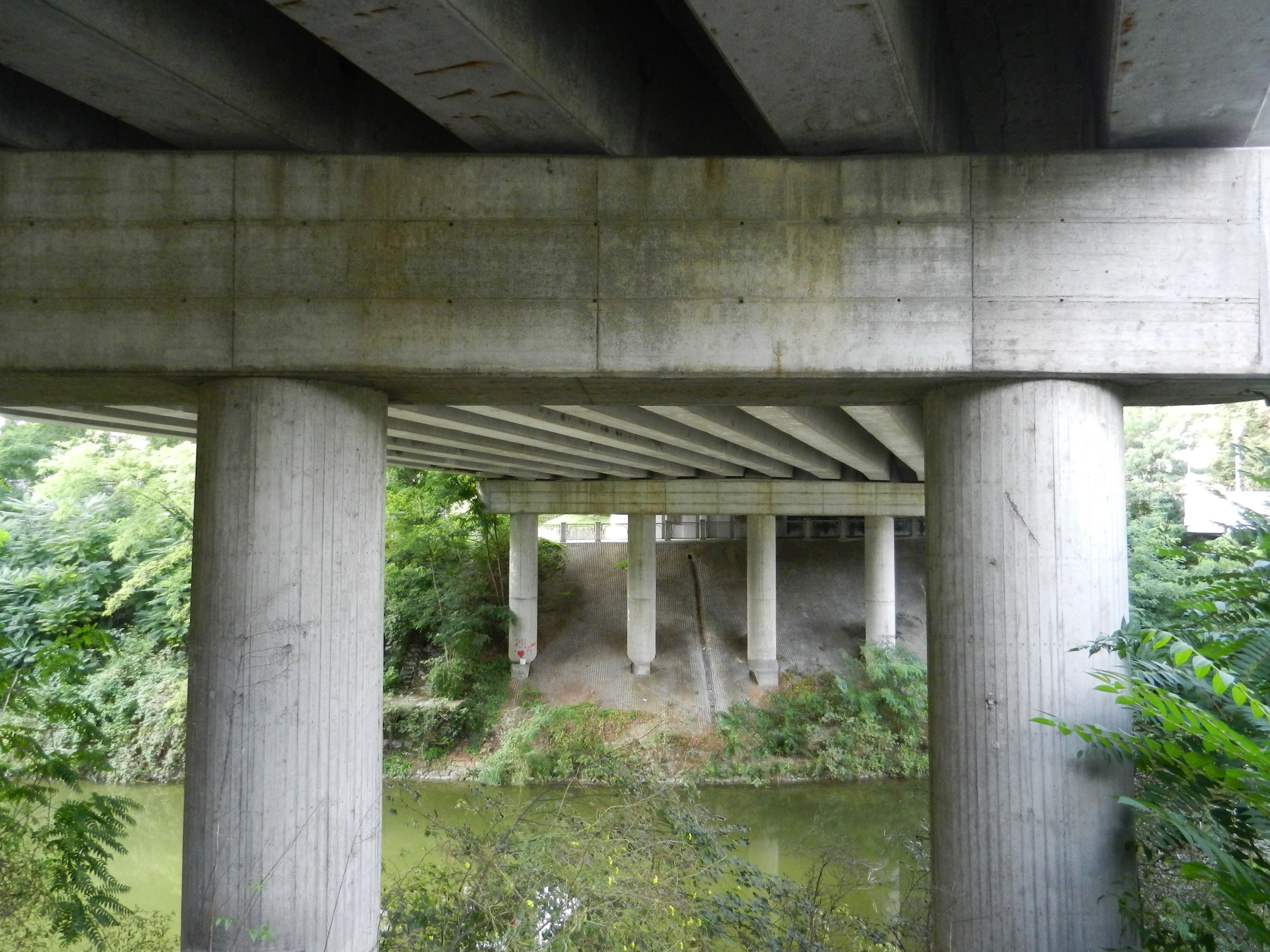
A bridge design utilizes support elements (columns) and spanning elements (two orthogonal sets of beams)

Vertical support is a category of structural systems or elements in architecture and architectural engineering designed to facilitate the vertical dimensions of space and mass, for example, columns and load-bearing walls. Along with horizontal spanning systems (like beams), vertical supports form the core of a building's structure, housing human activities and enabling the creation of habitable environments.

== Function ==
The primary function of a vertical support is to act as part of a structural system (a "stable assembly" that sustains architectural forms). As a fundamental component of a structural system, it is responsible for supporting and transmitting applied loads (such as gravity, wind, and earthquake forces) safely to the ground without exceeding the allowable stresses in the members.

In the context of architectural design, vertical supports function similarly to a skeletal system in a body; they give shape and form to the building while providing support for other building systems and organs.

=== Human scale ===
Vertical supports are instrumental in establishing the scale of a building's interior. Of the three dimensions of a room, height has a greater impact on perceived scale than width or length; a ceiling height that feels comfortable in a smaller room may feel oppressive in a large assembly space. As the unsupported height of columns and bearing walls increases, they must become thicker to maintain stability, which additionally influences the visual scale of the space.

== Structural behavior ==
Vertical supports must collect gravity loads from the horizontal spanning systems (trusses, beams, and slabs) and redirect them downward.

=== Load distribution ===
The load imposed on a specific vertical support is determined by its tributary area, which corresponds to the span of the floor or roof structure it carries. In a regular structural grid:

- Interior columns: carry the gravity loads for one full bay (extending halfway to the nearest column in all directions).
- Perimeter columns: carry approximately one-half the load of an interior column.
- Corner columns: carry approximately a quarter of the load of an interior column.

Skipping a column in the grid transfers its load to adjacent supports. In multistory buildings, the gravity loads add up as they are transmitted downward through successive floors to the foundation.

== Development and types ==
The form and material of vertical supports have evolved significantly throughout history, transitioning from massive elements to lighter skeletal frames.

=== Stone and masonry ===
Early vertical supports were characterized by high mass:

- Pillars and columns: Neolithic structures, such as those in Banpo, China (c. 5000 BC), utilized thick pillars to support roofs. The Egyptians mastered trabeated (post-and-lintel) stone construction, exemplified by the Hypostyle Hall at Karnak (1500 BC). Ancient Greeks perfected the system, with the Parthenon (447 BC) representing the pinnacle of the Doric order in column design.
- Bearing walls: Until the late-18th century, stone and masonry bearing wall systems came to dominate the vertical support designs. These systems simultaneously provided support and enclosure, with formal modifications limited to molding or carving the material mass.

Concrete and masonry walls rely on their bulk for load-carrying capability and can withstand high compression forces, but require reinforcement to resist the tensile stresses.

=== Timber, iron, and steel ===
The Industrial Revolution introduced high-strength materials that allowed vertical supports to become slender skeletal elements rather than massive walls: Unlike timber frames, the rigid steel and reinforced concrete designs might get away with no diagonal bracing or shear planes to ensure lateral stability.

- Cast iron frame: By 1797, Ditherington Flax Mill utilized a structural frame of cast iron columns and beams, becoming the world's first iron-framed building.
- Steel frames: The Home Insurance Building (1884) utilized a 10-story frame of steel and cast iron to carry the majority of the weight of floors and walls, reducing the reliance on masonry for support. Steel frames may utilize moment connections for rigidity but require fireproofing to qualify as fire-resistive construction.

=== Concrete ===
Vertical supports in reinforced concrete have allowed for diverse structural expressions. Concrete frames are typically rigid and qualify as noncombustible construction.

- Pillars: Modern suspension structures, such as the Olympic Arena in Tokyo (1961), utilize reinforced concrete pillars to anchor steel cables.
- Ribs: The Sydney Opera House (1973) utilizes precast concrete ribs to form its iconic shell structure.

== Geometric and advanced support structures ==
In the field of architectural geometry, complex freeform designs require support structures that address the geometric complexity of nodes where multiple beams intersect.

=== Torsion-free supports ===
In large-scale steel gridshells, the connection of beams at a vertex can introduce significant torsion if not geometrically optimized. A torsion-free support structure is defined geometrically as an arrangement of planar quadrilaterals along the edges of a mesh such that all quadrilaterals meeting at a vertex intersect in a single common line, known as the node axis. When structural beams are aligned with these quadrilaterals, their symmetry planes pass through the node axis, creating a torsion-free node that is significantly easier to manufacture than a general node. This principle was utilized for the support structure of the Yas Hotel Abu Dhabi.

=== Parallel meshes and offsets ===
Torsion-free support structures can be derived from parallel meshes (also known as offset meshes). Two meshes are considered parallel if they share the same combinatorics and their corresponding edges are parallel; the beam structure effectively connects these two layers. A special case is the conical mesh, where the parallel meshes are at a constant face-to-face distance, allowing for the use of node axes that coincide with the axes of the cones associated with the mesh vertices.

=== Semidiscrete supports ===
For structures requiring curved members, the concept of a support structure can be refined through a limit process into a semidiscrete support structure. This results in support members that form developable strips, which allows for the fabrication of curved beams with rectangular cross-sections by bending flat material rather than complex molding or machining. This technique was applied to the pavilions at the Eiffel Tower, where the beams follow the principal curvature lines of the reference surface.

=== Tensegrity ===
Tensegrity, a term coined by Buckminster Fuller in 1960, refers to structural systems composed of isolated components under compression (struts) inside a continuous net of tension (cables). This separation allows for lightweight support structures where distinct elements handle specific forces—cables allowing only tension and struts allowing only compression. The Kurilpa Bridge (2009) is cited as a notable example, being the largest tensegrity bridge in the world.

== Spatial relationship ==
The pattern of vertical supports is intrinsically linked to the spatial composition of a design. Because columns and walls have a greater presence in the visual field than horizontal planes, they are instrumental in defining volumes of space.

- Columns: A structural frame of columns and beams allows for relationships to be established with adjacent spaces on all four sides of the defined volume.
- Bearing walls: Using parallel bearing walls creates a directional quality, orienting the space toward open ends. If a space is enclosed on all four sides by bearing walls, it becomes introverted and must rely on openings for connection to adjacent spaces.

The structural/spatial relationship can be approached in two different ways:

- Correspondence between structural and spatial arrangements: The pattern of supports prescribes the disposition of spaces, or conversely, the spatial requirements dictate the structural rhythm.
- Flexibility: The structural form is designed as a "looser fit," allowing freedom in the interior spatial layout independent of the vertical supports.

== Sources ==
- Ching, Francis D.K.; Onouye, Barry; Zuberbuhler, Douglas (2009). Building Structures Illustrated: Patterns, Systems, and Design (1st ed.). John Wiley & Sons. ISBN 978-0470187852.
- Ching, Francis D.K.; Onouye, Barry; Zuberbuhler, Douglas (2014). Building Structures Illustrated: Patterns, Systems, and Design (2nd ed.). John Wiley & Sons. ISBN 978-1-118-45835-8.
- Pottmann, Helmut; Eigensatz, Michael; Vaxman, Amir; Wallner, Johannes (2015). "Architectural geometry" (PDF). Computers & Graphics. 47: 145–164. doi:10.1016/j.cag.2014.11.002.
