= Monuments of Verona =

Monuments in Verona, Italy

City of Verona
UNESCO World Heritage Site
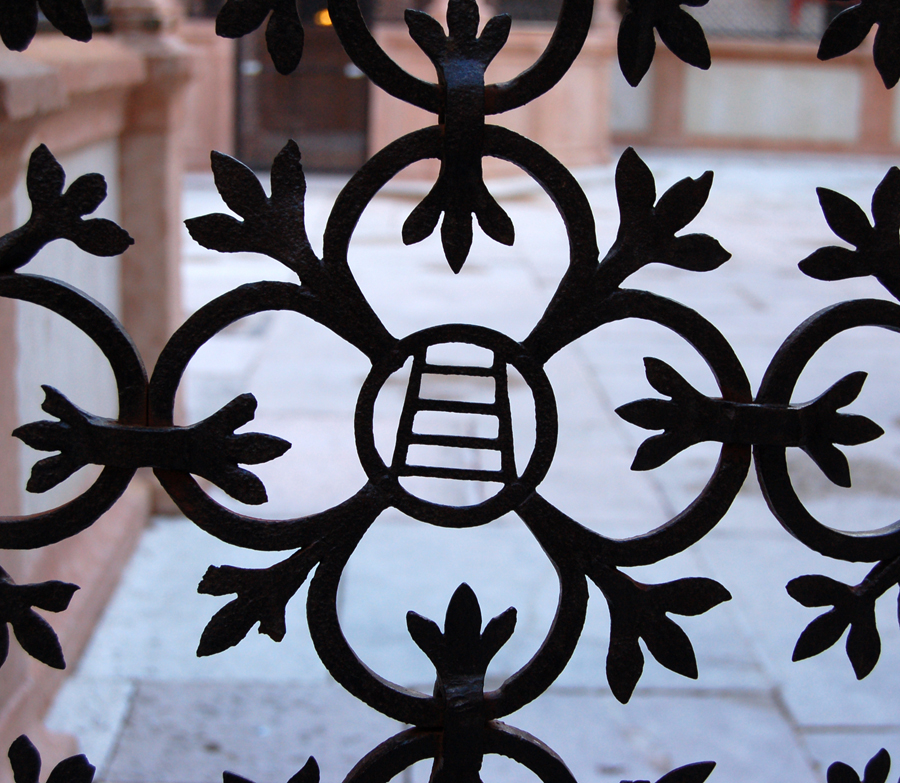
- Criteria: C (ii) (iv)
- Reference: 797
- Inscription: 2000 (24th Session)

The monuments of Verona are a vast number of architecturally, archaeologically, historically, and artistically significant cultural assets that characterize the city of Verona. Due to the richness of its monuments and the urban evolution that has developed seamlessly over the centuries, UNESCO declared the city a World Heritage Site in 2000.

== Religious architecture ==
=== Churches ===
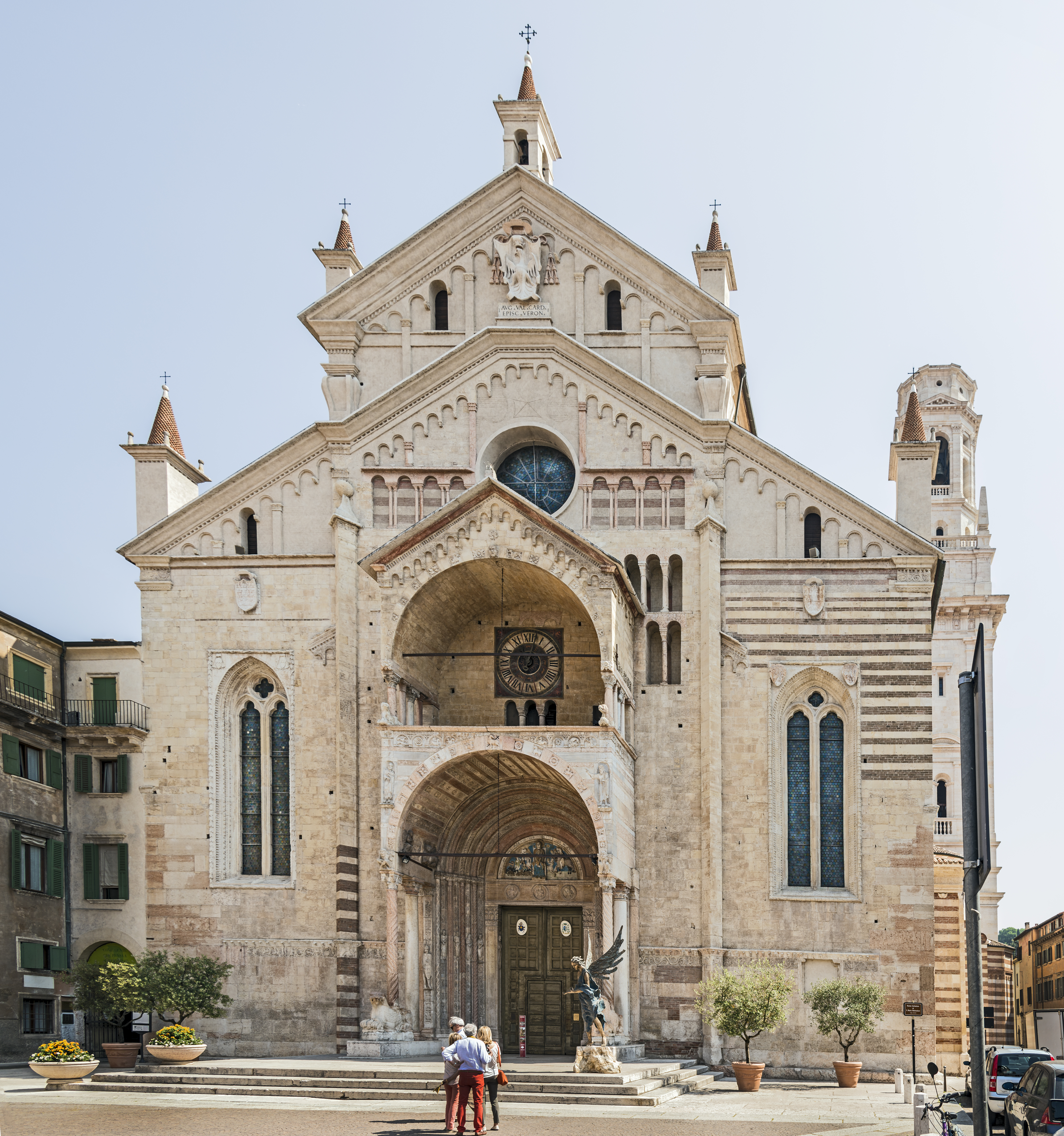
Verona Cathedral

Verona Cathedral
The Verona Cathedral is a complex of buildings consisting of the main church, dedicated to Our Lady of the Assumption, the church of St. John in Fonte, formerly a baptistery, the church of St. Helena, and the Chapter Library, one of the oldest libraries in the world and among the most important of its kind in Europe. Where the Cathedral stands today, public baths and a temple dedicated to Minerva probably stood in Roman times. The first basilica was built in the area now occupied by the church of St. Helen. Around the middle of the fifth century, in view of its small size, a second, larger church building had to be built, while the undemolished parts of the older building were used for various functions. The second building collapsed toward the end of the 8th century due to a fire. Extensive remains of mosaic floors under the church of St. Helen and in the canonical cloister still survive of these first two early Christian churches. Thus, between the end of the 8th century and the beginning of the 9th, the new cathedral dedicated to St. Mary Matricular was built on the very area where it still stands today, work that was planned and begun by Bishop Annon and completed by one of his successors, Ratoldo. The disastrous earthquake of 1117, however, severely damaged it, and it was then enlarged and heavily restored over the next two decades, acquiring its final Romanesque appearance, although over the centuries it underwent several modernizations that partly modified its morphology, particularly in the early medieval and Renaissance periods.

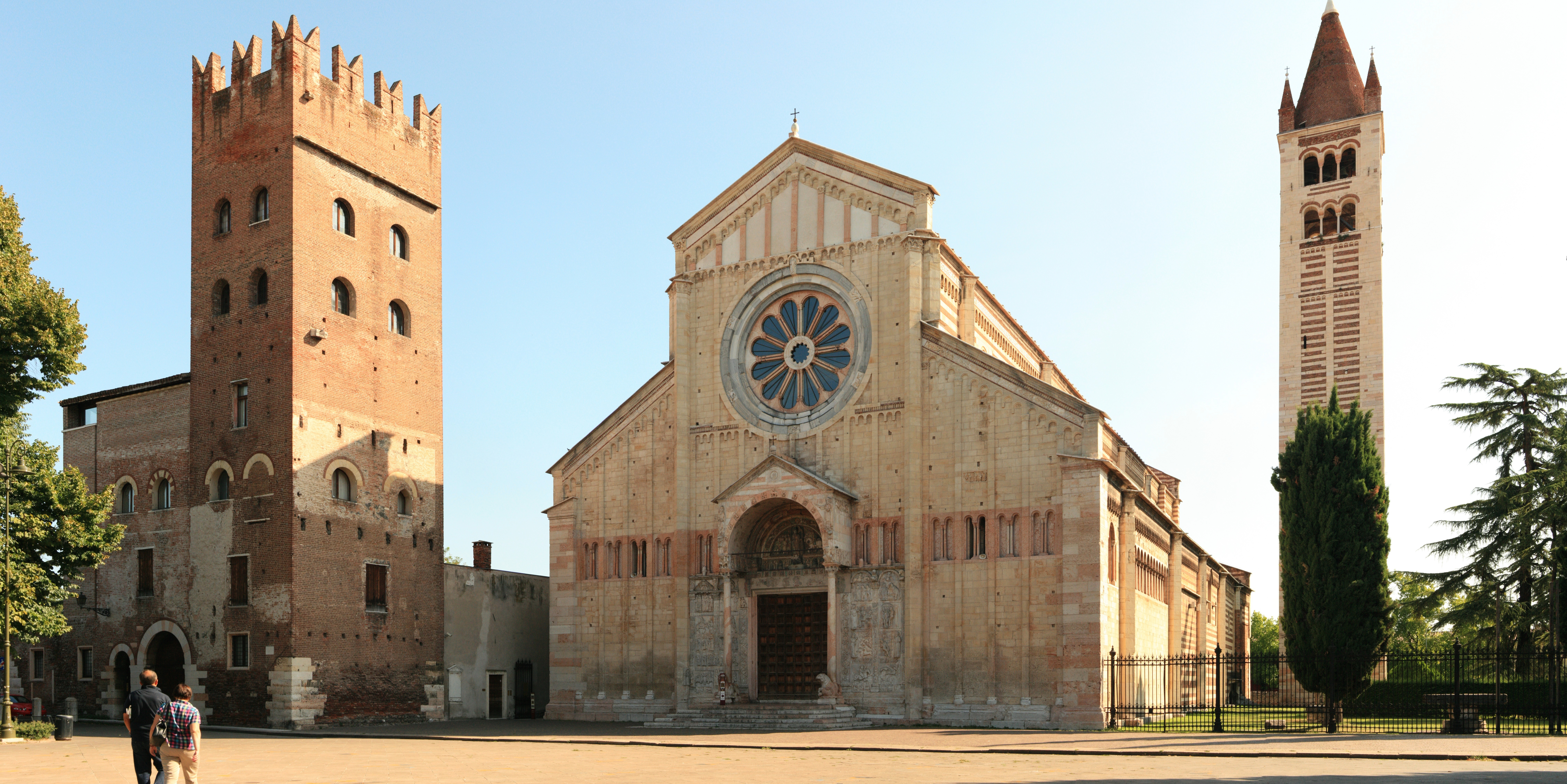
Basilica of San Zeno

Basilica of San Zeno
The basilica of San Zeno, overlooking the same square on which the abbey tower of San Zeno and the church of San Procolo stand, is one of the masterpieces of Romanesque architecture in Italy. The site where the basilica would later be built was originally a Roman and early Christian cemetery area near the Via Gallica, where Verona's bishop Zeno, the city's patron saint, was also buried, and on which a church and a coenobium were built. The building was rebuilt in the early 9th century at the behest of Bishop Ratoldo and the king of Italy Pepin, who judged it inconvenient for the body of the patron saint to rest in a poor church, so, with the help of Archdeacon Pacifico, a new basilica was built to which the saint's body could be transferred, which was completed and consecrated in 806. The building underwent several reconstructions due to the Hungarian invasions and the earthquake of 1117, so its final appearance in Lombard Romanesque style derives from major works carried out over the centuries, while still keeping the medieval layout substantially unchanged. The church houses several works of art, including a masterpiece by Andrea Mantegna, the San Zeno altarpiece, the famous portal with its bronze panels, and the large rose window on the facade, called the "Wheel of Fortune," by the stonemason Brioloto de Balneo.

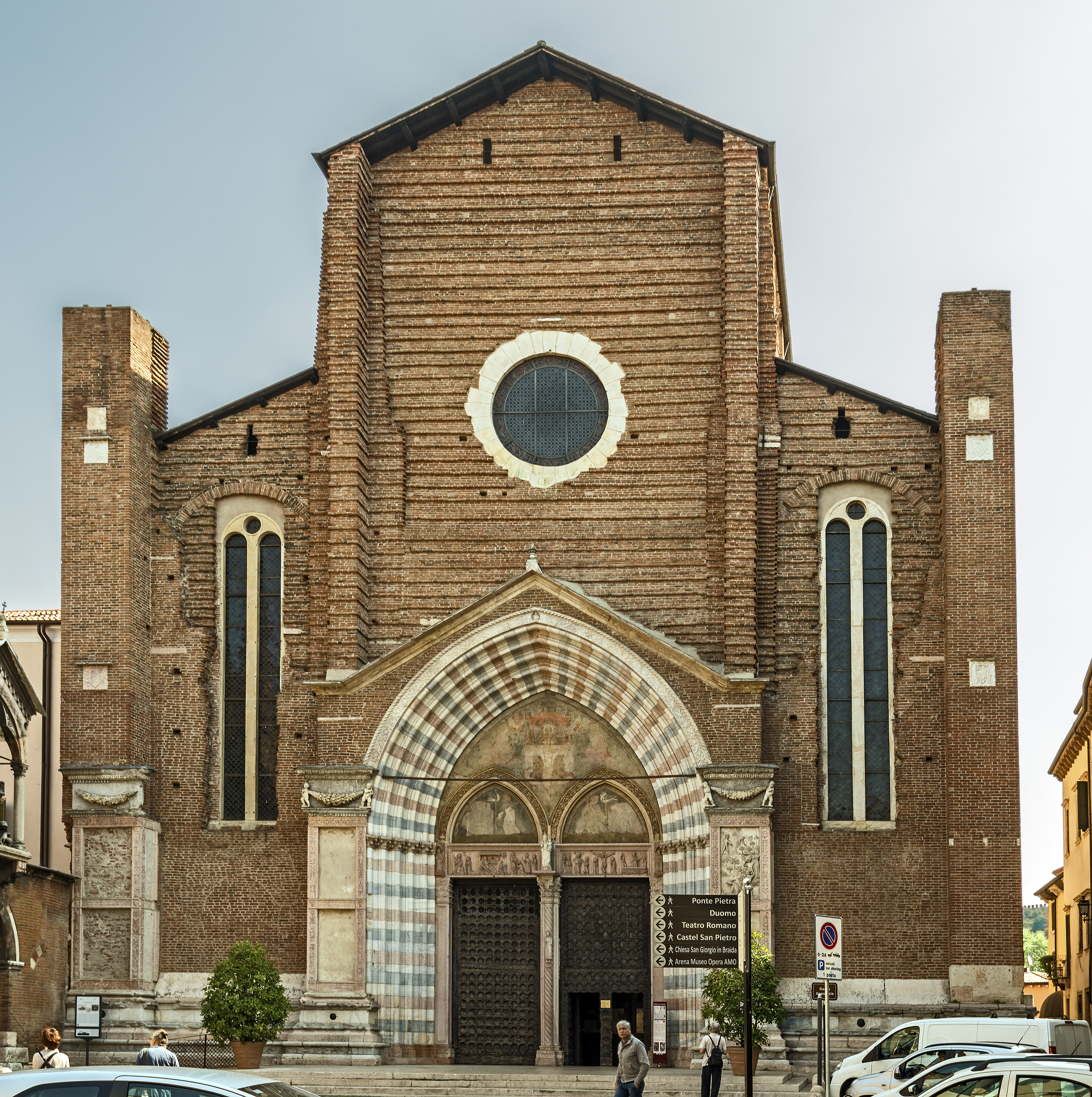
Basilica of Santa Anastasia

Basilica of St. Anastasia
The basilica of Santa Anastasia, which retains the name of a pre-existing church from the Lombard era dedicated to the fourth-century martyr Anastasia of Sirmium, is a masterful example of Italian Gothic architecture. The building stands at the terminal section of the ancient decumanus maximus, Verona's main Roman road continuation of the Via Postumia, next to the smaller, deconsecrated church of St. Peter Martyr. At the end of the 13th century, the Dominican order settled there, to whom is owed the construction of the Gothic basilica, also dedicated to St. Peter Martyr, a Dominican native of Verona and patron saint of the city along with St. Zeno. A great contribution to the construction of the church is owed to the Della Scala family, Lords of Verona, through generous donations and testamentary bequests that financed its lengthy construction. Work continued until the end of the 16th century, never reaching completion of the façade. In the right transept of the church is the Pellegrini Chapel, famous because it contains what is considered Pisanello's masterpiece, the St. George and the Princess, frescoed on the outer wall above the entrance arch.

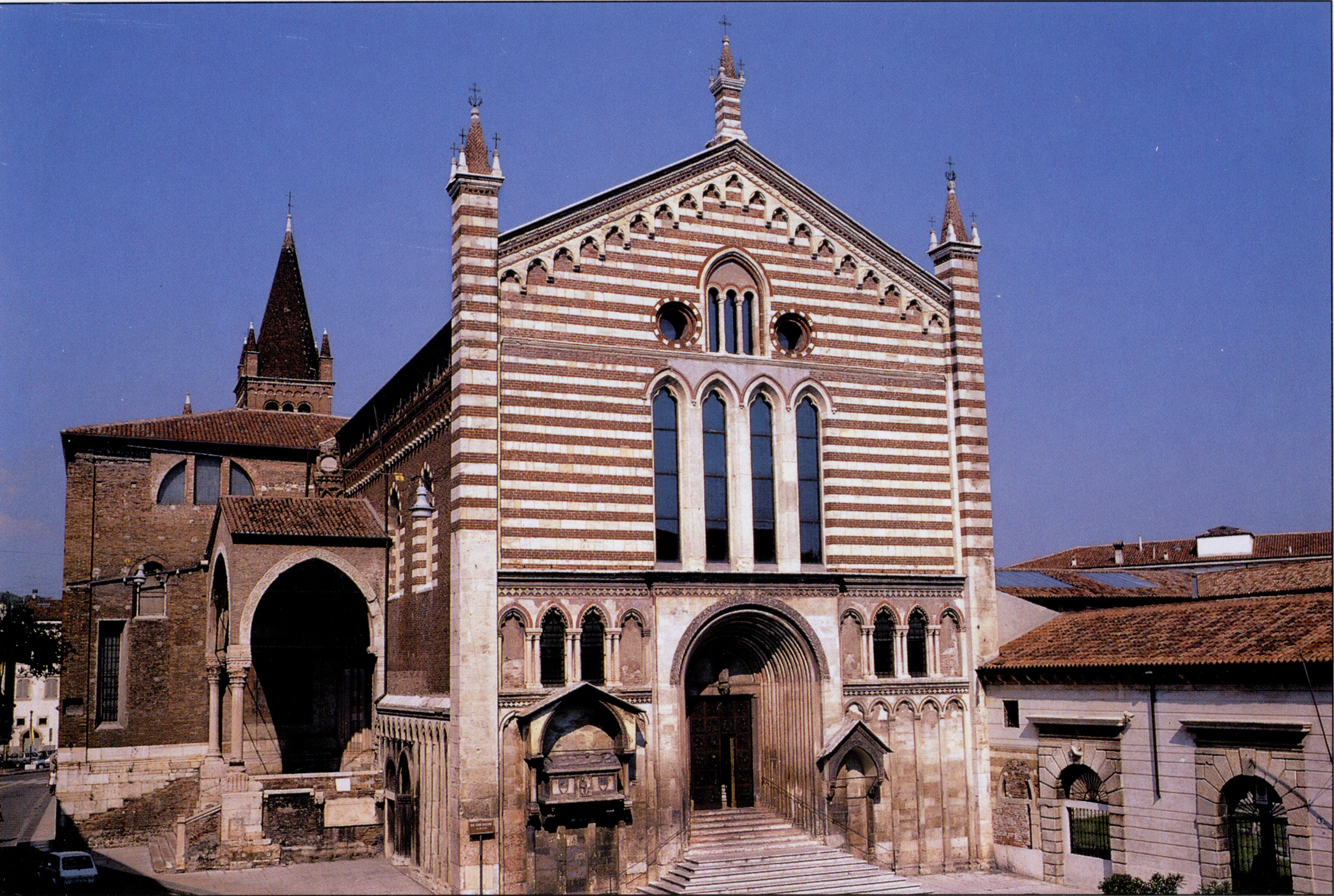
Church of San Fermo Maggiore

Church of San Fermo
The church of San Fermo Maggiore is one of the most original religious buildings in Verona, consisting of two churches built in different periods, connected and overlapping each other. The lower part of the church building was built mainly between the 11th and 12th centuries in the Romanesque style, which was followed by major works in the 14th century, during which the upper church was built and the earlier style was harmoniously blended with the typical Gothic architecture. This Gothic episode constitutes a singular case in the city's panorama, both because of the presence of spires and pinnacles that are evidently intended to refer to French architecture, and because of the presence of an unusual roof, composed of two pitches on which clings a wooden structure that takes on the appearance of an upside-down ship's hull due to the presence of a series of corbels alternating with half-vaults, superimposed on each other. The complex, located in the vicinity of Ponte Navi, was built on the site of an earlier one, which in turn was built where tradition has it that Saints Firmus and Rusticus suffered martyrdom in 304.

Other churches

Other churches of special significance in Verona include:

- Church of San Bernardino, a 15th-century building that was part of a Franciscan convent. In particular, the Pellegrini Chapel, designed by the famous Veronese architect Michele Sanmicheli in the 16th century, occupies a fundamental place in the history of Italian architecture;
- Church of St. Euphemia, the foundation of which is due to the Scaligeri. The vast interiors contain valuable works by several painters of the Veronese school, including: Giovan Francesco Caroto, Francesco Torbido, il Moretto, Dionisio Battaglia, Battista del Moro, Paolo Farinati, Jacopo Ligozzi, Bernardino India, Domenico and Felice Brusasorzi;
- Church of San Giorgio in Braida, a Renaissance building admired by Scipione Maffei and Goethe for the numerous works of art housed there, particularly Tintoretto's Baptism of Christ placed above the main door, the two huge canvases placed near the chancel, namely the Multiplication of the Loaves and The Manna in the Desert by Paolo Farinati and Domenico Brusasorzi respectively, and the Martyrdom of St. George, a 1564 work by Paolo Veronese, hanging in the apse basin;
- Church of San Giovanni in Foro is a church building that, as its name suggests, bordered directly on the Verona Forum, and for the same reason in the past it also had the title of basilica. On the exterior is a marble triptych with an inscription commemorating the fire that did serious damage to the town and destroyed the church in 1172, as well as a small Renaissance masterpiece, the entrance portal carved by Gerolamo Giolfino and with the niche frescoed by Nicola Giolfino;
- Church of San Giovanni in Valle, which was built on the site of a pagan necropolis and a Roman temple, is one of the oldest churches in Verona and a masterpiece of Verona's mature Romanesque style. In the crypt, next to the high altar, are kept two sarcophagi of great value: one dating from the fourth century has a bas-relief sculpture on three sides in two overlapping orders with stories from the Old and New Testaments narrated, and the other, from the second or third century, is a strigilated sarcophagus from the pagan period with two spouses in a shell in the center, above a rural scene and with two figures of philosophers later transformed into Christian saints on either side;
- Church of San Lorenzo, which was built in the 5th century between the Via Postumia and the Adige River, perfectly oriented according to the road layout of Roman Verona, despite undergoing major transformations in the 12th century following the disastrous earthquake that struck Verona. The façade is characterized by two large circular scalar towers placed on either side of a hanging prothyrum: these, a rare example of Norman architecture in northern Italy, allowed access to the large tribunes placed above the aisles;
- Church of Santa Maria Antica, consecrated in 1185 by the patriarch of Aquileia, was the private chapel of the Scaligeri, Lords of Verona, who built the Scaliger Tombs, or the family cemetery, to the side. The entrance door is surmounted by the tomb and statue of Cangrande I della Scala, an enlightened and respected ruler, with whom the city rediscovered a new period of splendor and importance, so much so that Dante dedicated the entire cantica of Paradise in the Divine Comedy to him;
- Church of Santa Maria in Organo, characterized by a majestic unfinished façade: the lower part in white marble is the work of the famous Renaissance architect Michele Sanmicheli, while the upper part in rows of terracotta and tuff still presents its ancient Romanesque-Gothic appearance. Particularly refined are the inlays in the wooden choir and on the sacristy cupboards, made in the late 15th and early 16th centuries by Fra Giovanni da Verona, where urban landscapes, allegories, still lifes and various objects are depicted;
- Church of Saints Nazaro and Celso, a building made in a mixture of Gothic style and Renaissance architecture. In the church is the Chapel of St. Blaise, completed in 1508 to house the relics of the martyrs St. Blaise and St. Juliana, which houses the masterpieces of some of the most important Veronese painters of the 16th century, notably Giovanni Maria Falconetto, Bartolomeo Montagna and Girolamo dai Libri;
- Church of Saints Siro and Libera, a small church founded in the 10th century among the ruins of Verona's ancient Roman theater. The building underwent some transformations during the 14th century, when side chapels were added and the choir was built, while the two-branched staircase for access to the building was built at the turn of the 17th and 18th centuries;
- Church of St. Stephen, a church building of very ancient origins; despite some remodeling over the centuries, part of the structure remains the one built around the fifth century, making it an almost unique example of early Christian architecture in Verona. Also inside is the Varalli Chapel, one of the most flourishing examples of Baroque architecture in the Verona area;
- Church of Saints Teuteria and Tosca, partly incorporated into the Church of the Holy Apostles, is a Greek cross-shaped shrine dating back to the 5th century: this makes it the oldest church in the Veneto region. It was built on the side of the Via Postumia, probably near the Christian cemetery where the two saints had been buried;
- Church of San Tomaso Cantuariense, which houses numerous works of art that were made by famous painters of the Veronese school, including canvases by Paolo Farinati, Girolamo dai Libri, Alessandro Turchi and Antonio Balestra. Also inside is a historic Baroque pipe organ that was played by the young Wolfgang Amadeus Mozart on January 7, 1770, during one of his trips to Italy, and he left his initials engraved on the case with a penknife, which are still visible today;
- Church of San Zeno in Oratorio, a small Romanesque church also known as San Zeno Oratore, as tradition has it that it was a refuge where the patron saint Zeno would retire to pray. The stone used by Zeno to sit on while fishing nearby in the nearby Adige River is found there, a symbol of the sobriety of his life and his mandate as a fisher of souls.

=== Cemeteries ===
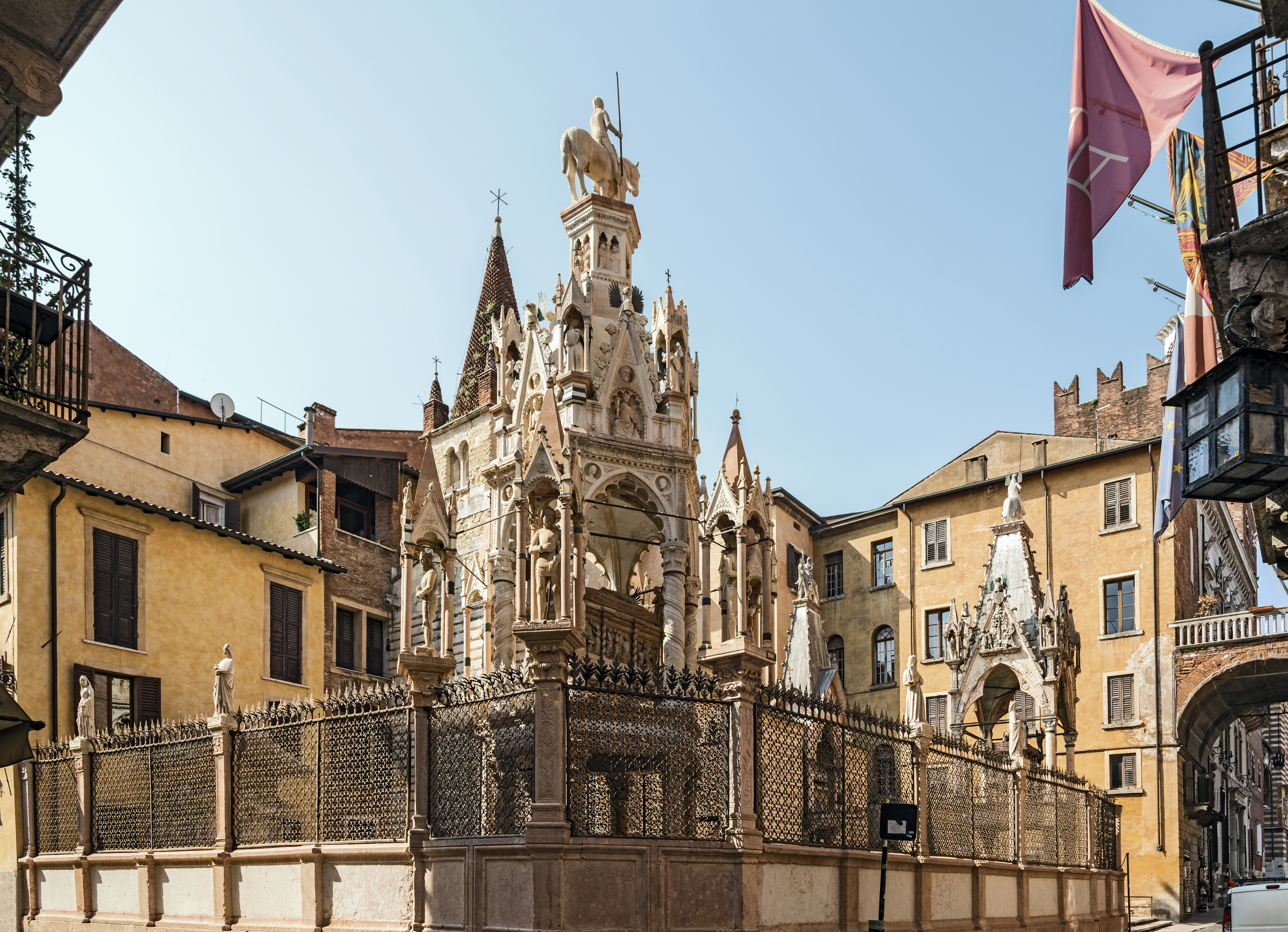
The Scaliger Tombs

Scaliger tombs
The Scaliger tombs, located to the side of the church of Santa Maria Antica, just a few steps from the Piazza dei Signori, are a scenic and monumental funerary complex of the Scaliger family, intended to contain the remains of some of the illustrious representatives of the lineage, including that of the most famous Lord of Verona, Cangrande I della Scala, to whom Dante Alighieri dedicates Paradise. It is a masterpiece of Gothic art, an incredible fusion of sculpture and architecture, so much so that the French historian Georges Duby, in his Europe of the Middle Ages, called the Scaliger tombs "one of the most distinguished and significant monuments of Gothic art." The Scaliger sepulchre consists of three main canopied tombs, those of Mastino II and Cansignorio della Scala, as well as the aforementioned Cangrande I della Scala, but there are also the tombs of six members of the dynasty: Mastino I, Alberto I, Bartolomeo, Alboino, Giovanni and Cangrande II della Scala.

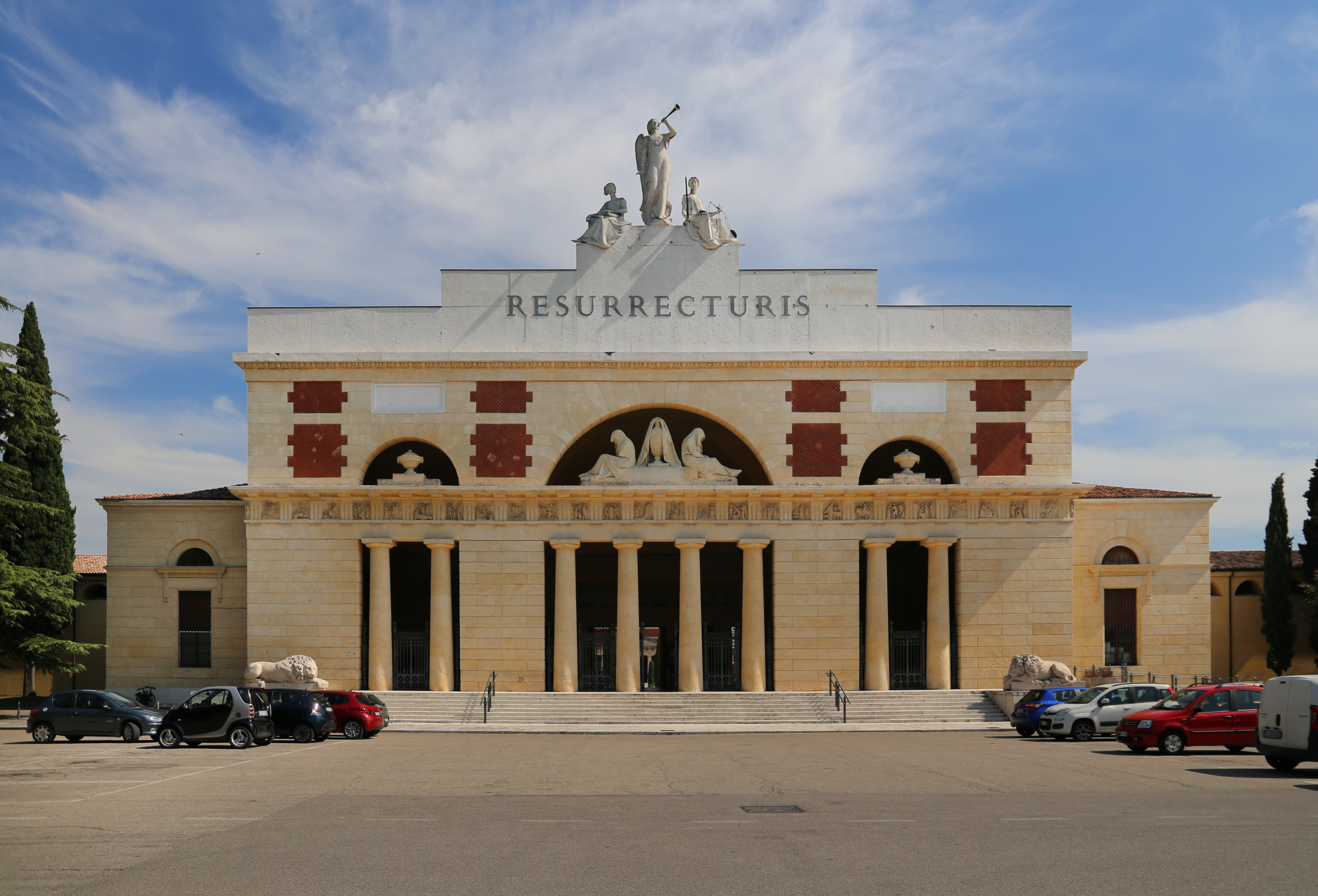
Monumental cemetery

Monumental cemetery
Verona's Monumental Cemetery is the city's main cemetery, characterized by a sober neoclassical style and a main facade decorated with sculptures inspired by the Canovian style. Its construction became necessary as a result of Napoleonic laws that required cemetery areas to be built outside the city walls, so in 1828 the architect Giuseppe Barbieri was commissioned to build the new cemetery near Porta Vittoria. The complex, despite its generous size, was quickly completed, so new additions were made in the 1910s and 1930s. Inside are housed some two hundred monumental tombs, adorned with sculptures by artists including some by Giovanni Dupré, Ettore Ferrari, and Luigi Ferrari, as well as numerous local sculptors and architects, such as Ugo Zannoni and Ettore Fagiuoli. Famous burials include those of Futurist artist Umberto Boccioni, writer Emilio Salgari, and Renaissance architect Michele Sanmicheli.

=== Synagogues ===
Synagogue of Verona
The Verona synagogue is located in the heart of what for many centuries was the Jewish ghetto of Verona, just a few steps from Via Mazzini. The construction of the building began in the second half of the 19th century and was finished with a modern compositional language chosen by Verona architect Ettore Fagiuoli in the first half of the following century. Having been built at a time of emancipation and social equalization of Jews, the place of worship is clearly identifiable from the outside due to its monumental facade, with the entrance portal set in a sort of large marble triumphal arch decorated with six bas-relief panels with Jewish symbols and surmounted by the Tablets of the Law. It is one of the largest synagogues in northern Italy, being able to accommodate approximately one thousand people.

== Civil architecture ==
=== Palaces ===
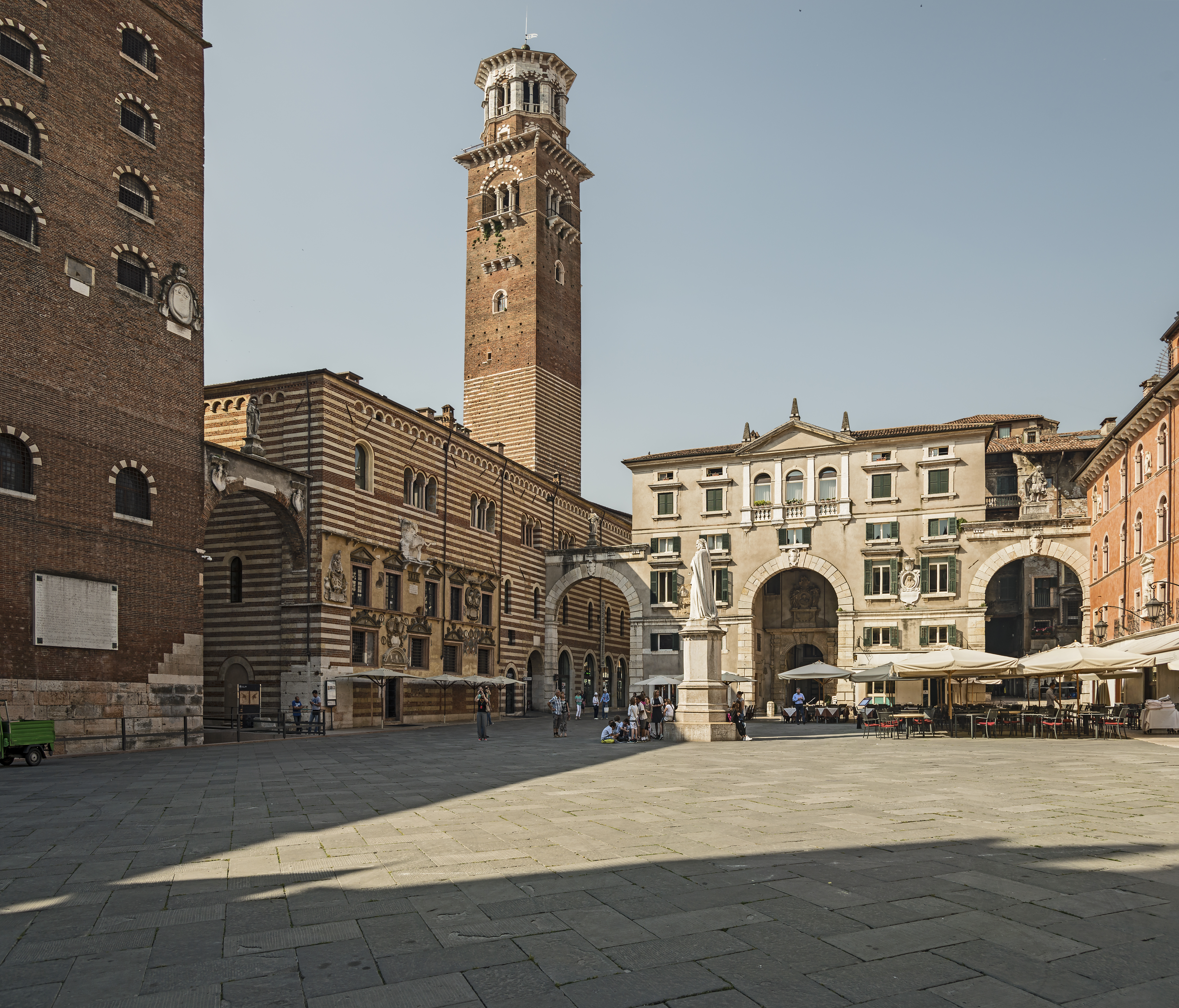
Palazzo della Ragione

Palazzo della Ragione
The Palazzo della Ragione (Palace of Reason), so named because during the rule of the Serenissima it housed the court, is a large central courtyard complex located straddling Piazza delle Erbe and Piazza dei Signori, built in the late 12th century to house the new magistracies of the Comune. The heart of political power first, and judicial power later, over the centuries it underwent a number of transformations to house the College of Notaries, the Silk Duty, the Fiscal Chamber, the Savings Bank, the Magistrate's Court and the Court of Assizes. The most prestigious room is the Notaries' Chapel, built between 1408 and 1419 on the commission of the College of Notaries, who dedicated it to Saints Zeno and Daniel. The room consists of four communicating rooms covered with ribbed vaults and houses one of the most important decorative complexes made on public commission in Verona, executed in the 18th century by Veronese painters Alessandro Marchesini, Giambattista Bellotti, Sante Prunati, and Frenchman Louis Dorigny. Also part of the building complex are the Lamberti Tower, built in 1172 and elevated several times until it became the tallest tower in the city, and the Stairway of Reason, fine late Gothic architecture built of red Verona marble. Following the displacement of the courthouse, the building was restored to a design by Tobia Scarpa in the early 21st century, becoming the permanent home of the Achille Forti Gallery of Modern Art, which displays modern Italian works by artists such as Giacomo Balla, Umberto Boccioni, and Francesco Hayez.

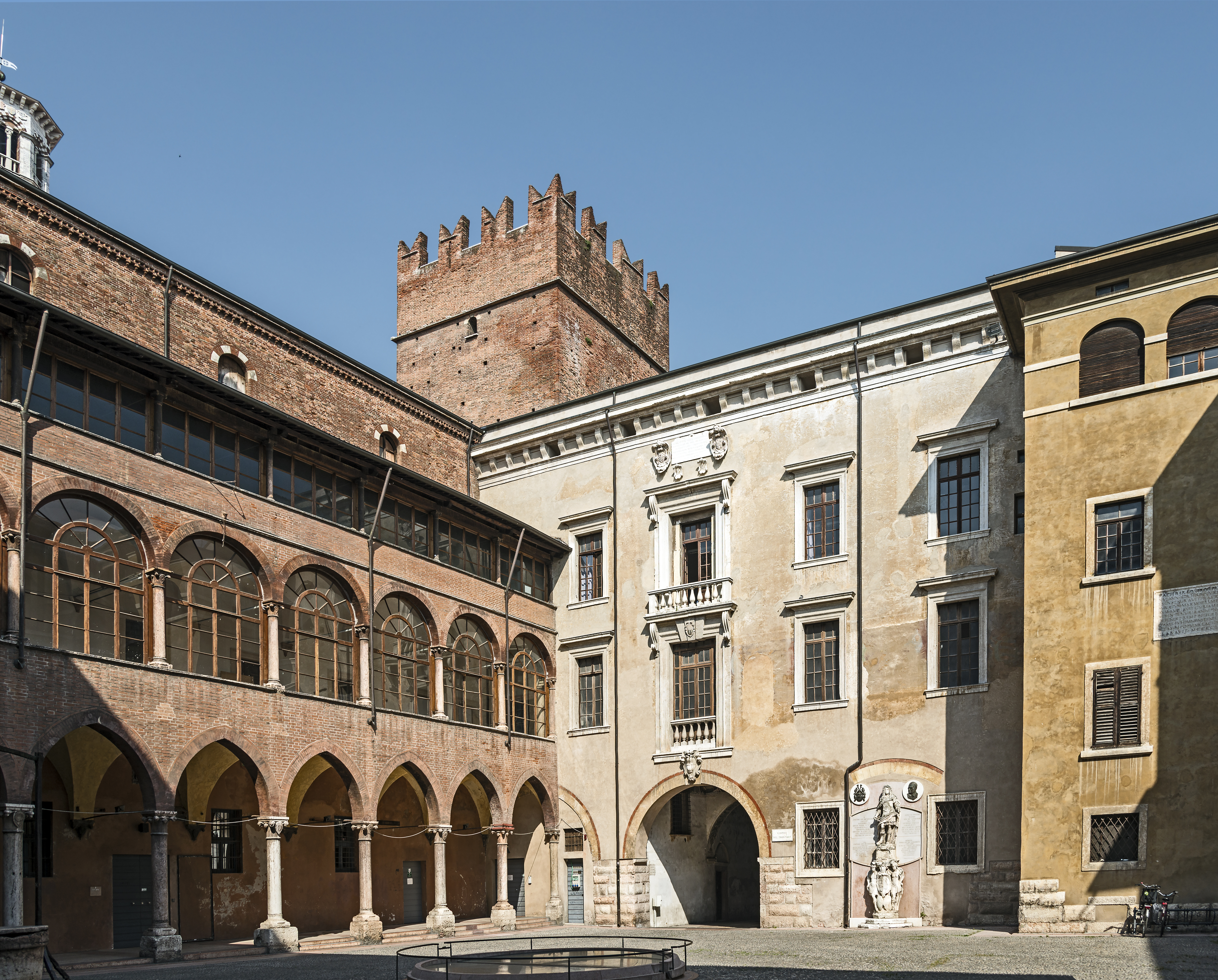
Palazzo del Capitanio

Palazzo del Capitanio
The Palazzo del Capitanio is a large building with a central courtyard facing Piazza dei Signori, so named because in Venetian times the Capitano, or city rector, settled there. Originally the palace, built by Cansignorio della Scala in the 14th century, was a fortified building with an austere appearance, characterized by three imposing towers that made it look almost like a castle; of this medieval palace only one of the towers survives intact, while the rest of the building underwent some transformations during the 16th century, so that its present appearance looks partly Gothic and partly from the Renaissance. Of particular artistic interest are the entrance portal to the building's courtyard, probably the work of architect Michele Sanmicheli, and the Baroque portal known as the portal of the Bombardiers, as in the past it gave access from the courtyard of the palace to the headquarters of the city's artillery corps. The palace is home to the Scavi Scaligeri International Center for Photography, an underground exhibition space that was built within an archaeological site that came to light between 1981 and 1983: the museum thus allows visitors to see Roman, Lombard, and medieval artifacts while simultaneously visiting exhibitions by international photographers.

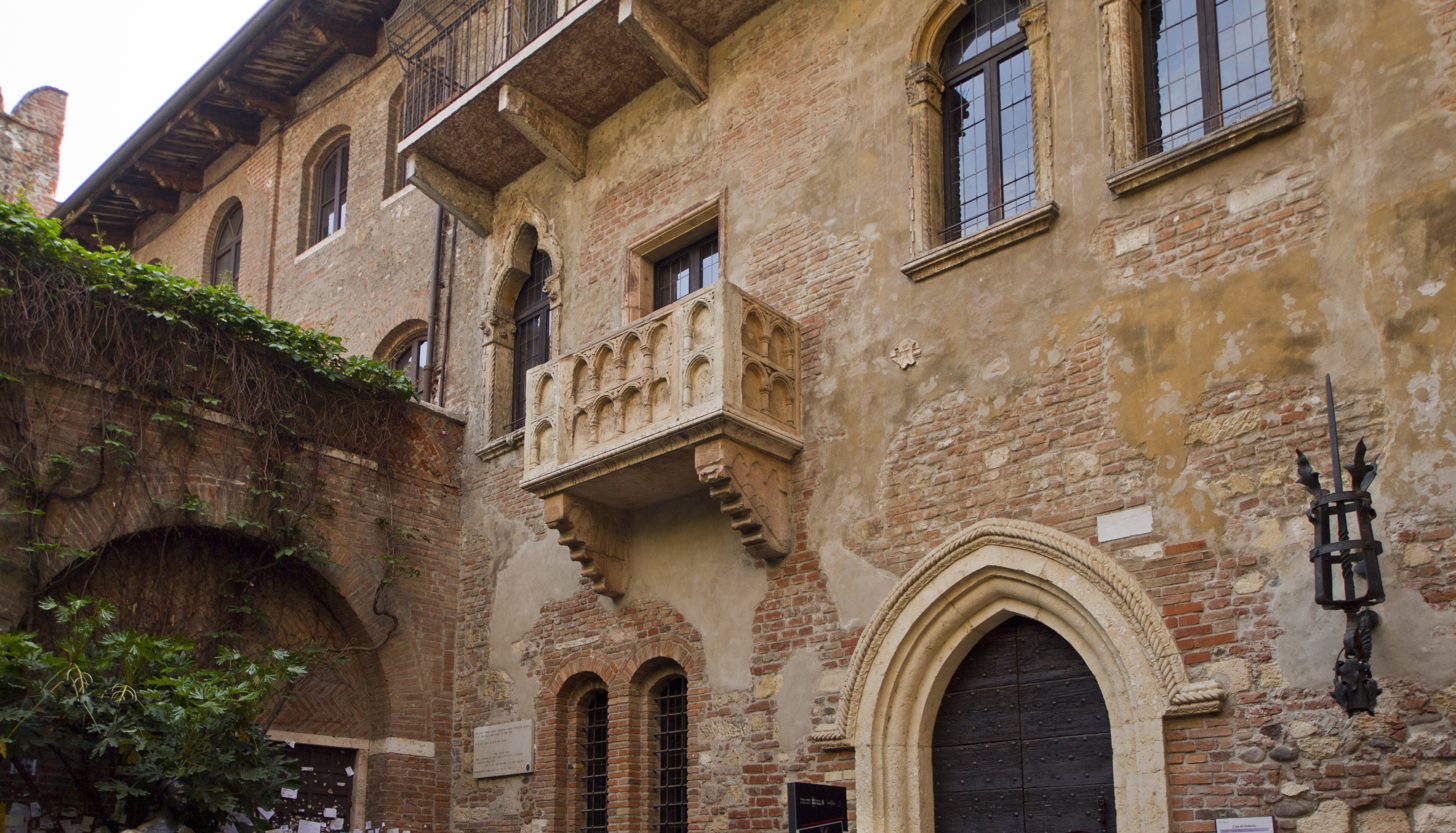
Juliet's House

Juliet's House
Casa Capuleti, long owned by the noble Dal Cappello family, whose coat of arms is visible in the entrance arch facing the courtyard, is a medieval residential building built in the 12th century on Cappello Street. The Cappello-Capuleti juxtaposition led to the belief that this was the real house of Juliet, the protagonist of the well-known tragedy by the English playwright and poet William Shakespeare, and in accordance with this it was restored in 1935 by the director of the Veronese Civic Museums Antonio Avena: the work led to the replacement of the previous balcony with a more striking marble one, as well as the modification of some doors and windows. The works inside the house respected the structure of the medieval spaces, such as the balustrade that allows communication between the different rooms of the house, and such as the main hall on the second floor, which in the past could be used indifferently for living and sleeping. The pictorial decorations, on the other hand, while reiterating recurring themes for the time when the building was constructed, were produced from scratch. In the courtyard is a bronze statue of Juliet by sculptor Nereo Costantini.

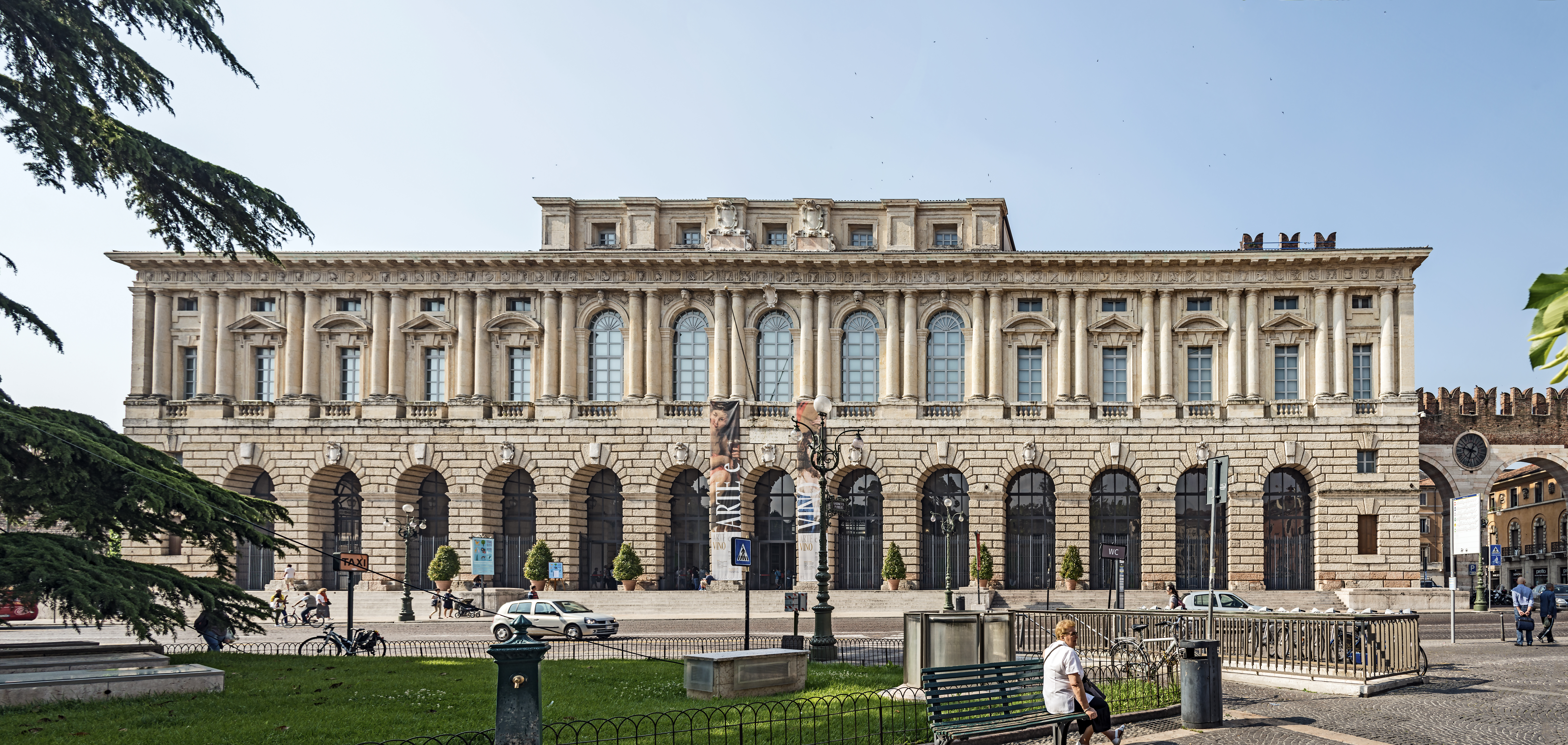
Gran Guardia

Gran Guardia
The Palazzo della Gran Guardia is a monumental complex overlooking Piazza Bra, a short distance from Palazzo Barbieri and the Arena of Verona. Construction work began in the early 17th century on a design by architect Domenico Curtoni: initially it was intended to be used as a weapon facility, with a vast portico that could be used to review troops and a main floor that would house the military academy. Work was interrupted, however, and did not resume until 1820, when architect Giuseppe Barbieri took over Curtoni's design and completed the work previously begun. The design of the building was influenced both by the one from the overlooking Roman amphitheater, particularly by the succession of wide arcades on the ground floor, and by the architecture of the famous Renaissance architect Michele Sanmicheli, in particular the two-story subdivision is reminiscent of the nearby Honorij Palace while the gables of the upper windows are similar to those of Bevilacqua Palace, located on Corso Cavour. The building was restored and expanded in the late 20th century to accommodate a modern and accessible multi-level conference and exhibition center.

Other palaces

Other palaces of special significance in Verona include:

- Case Mazzanti, which are a series of terraced residential buildings facing Piazza Erbe. They are among the oldest buildings in the city as well as the best-preserved example of the widespread Renaissance custom of frescoing the walls of city dwellings, which earned Verona the nickname Urbs Picta. In the picturesque alley behind there were in 1797 the first scuffles that started the revolt of the Veronese Easter against the French occupiers;
- Domus Mercatorum, which is a medieval building overlooking Piazza Erbe, commissioned by Alberto I della Scala, Lord of Verona, as the seat of the Guild of Arts and Crafts, so that people could trade and discuss various aspects of the city's economic life there;
- Loggia del Consiglio, one of the most important examples of Renaissance architecture in Verona. It was commissioned by the city's mayors for the sessions of the Patrio Consiglio, an expression of municipal autonomy in the Venetian period. The building, located in Piazza dei Signori next to other representative buildings (palazzo del Capitanio and palazzo del Podestà, which instead housed two Venetian governors) has long been attributed to Giovanni Giocondo, hence its second name of "loggia di Fra' Giocondo";
- Palazzo Barbieri, which houses the municipal administration, is an imposing neoclassical building designed by Giuseppe Barbieri and built between 1836 and 1848, when Verona was part of the Kingdom of Lombardy-Venetia, under the direct dependencies of the Austrian Empire, and the complex served as the headquarters of the Civic Guard Corps. The Hall of the Tapestries houses two huge 16th-century canvases, one coming out of Paolo Veronese's workshop and attributed to the two brothers, and a second by Paolo Farinati depicting the victory of the Veronese over Frederick Barbarossa's troops;
- Palazzo Bevilacqua, a Renaissance building designed by the famous architect Michele Sanmicheli but never completed, as evidenced by the asymmetrical position of the portal on the facade. The main floor of the palace is enclosed between a continuous balcony and a rich cornice;
- Palazzo Canossa, which is one of Michele Sanmicheli's masterpieces, so important that it hosted European rulers such as Napoleon Bonaparte, Tsar Alexander I, and the emperors of Austria Francis I, Ferdinand I, and Franz Joseph I. During the 16th century it was decorated by Verona's most important painters, Bernardino India, Battista del Moro, and Paolo Veronese;
- Palazzo Dalla Torre, the only work of Andrea Palladio in the city of Verona, whose design was only partially realized. The building was badly damaged during a World War II bombing, so only the majestic entrance portal and a courtyard with columns and entablature remain of the original building;
- Palazzo dei Diamanti, or more correctly Palazzo Cappella Sansebastiani, is a building whose design is attributed to Bernardino Brugnoli in the 16th century and was inspired by the better-known Palazzo dei Diamanti in Ferrara. Like that one, it is characterized by a facade face made of diamond-pointed carved stones;
- Palazzo Emilei Forti is a building that dates back to the 13th century but underwent major transformations in subsequent centuries, particularly in the 18th century when the main facade was renovated. Managed by the Fondazione Arena Di Verona, its halls house AMO, an acronym for Arena Museo Opera, dedicated entirely to opera with photographs, sets, music, costumes, and original sketches and scores by Gaetano Donizetti, Giacomo Puccini, Gioachino Rossini, and Giuseppe Verdi, while it previously housed the Achille Forti Gallery of Modern Art;
- Palazzo Giusti del Giardino, which houses an interesting 16th-century Italianate garden. The construction of the representative palace in the style of Sanmicheli and the arrangement of the garden according to the fashion of the time is due to the Tuscan Giusti family, which moved to Verona in the 15th century;
- Palazzo Maffei is a Baroque building that borders one side of Piazza delle Erbe. Built in the 17th century on three levels, the ground floor is punctuated by five wide arcades, the main floor features five large and elegant balcony windows framed in Ionic half-columns, while smaller rooms open on the second floor. Above closes the elevation a final elegant balustrade surmounted by six statues of Greek gods, including one from the Roman period;
- Palazzo del Podestà is a courtyard building built around the end of the 13th century. The monumental palace was the residence of many of the Scaligeri family and hosted Cangrande I della Scala and his court, including Dante Alighieri, an exile from Florence, and Giotto, who probably frescoed some rooms in the palace itself but whose work has been lost over the centuries. During the period of Serenissima rule, the palace housed the Podestà, or the official who exercised executive and judicial power for Venice. The Gothic facade facing Piazza dei Signori features a fine Renaissance portal by Michele Sanmicheli;
- Palazzo Pompei, famous Renaissance building, was commissioned in the 16th century by the noble Lavezzola family from architect Michele Sanmicheli. In the 1830s the building was donated by its owners to the municipality of Verona, which restored it so that it could house a gallery, which now houses the Civic Museum of Natural History;
- The administrative headquarters of Banco BPM is the work of the well-known Venetian architect Carlo Scarpa, who designed it in the 1970s, after he had already worked in Verona on the restoration of the Castelvecchio museum. The building, which fits perfectly into the urban context, is characterized, especially in its facades, by a constant reference to ancient architecture, although reinterpreted and presented in a modern style.

=== Villas ===
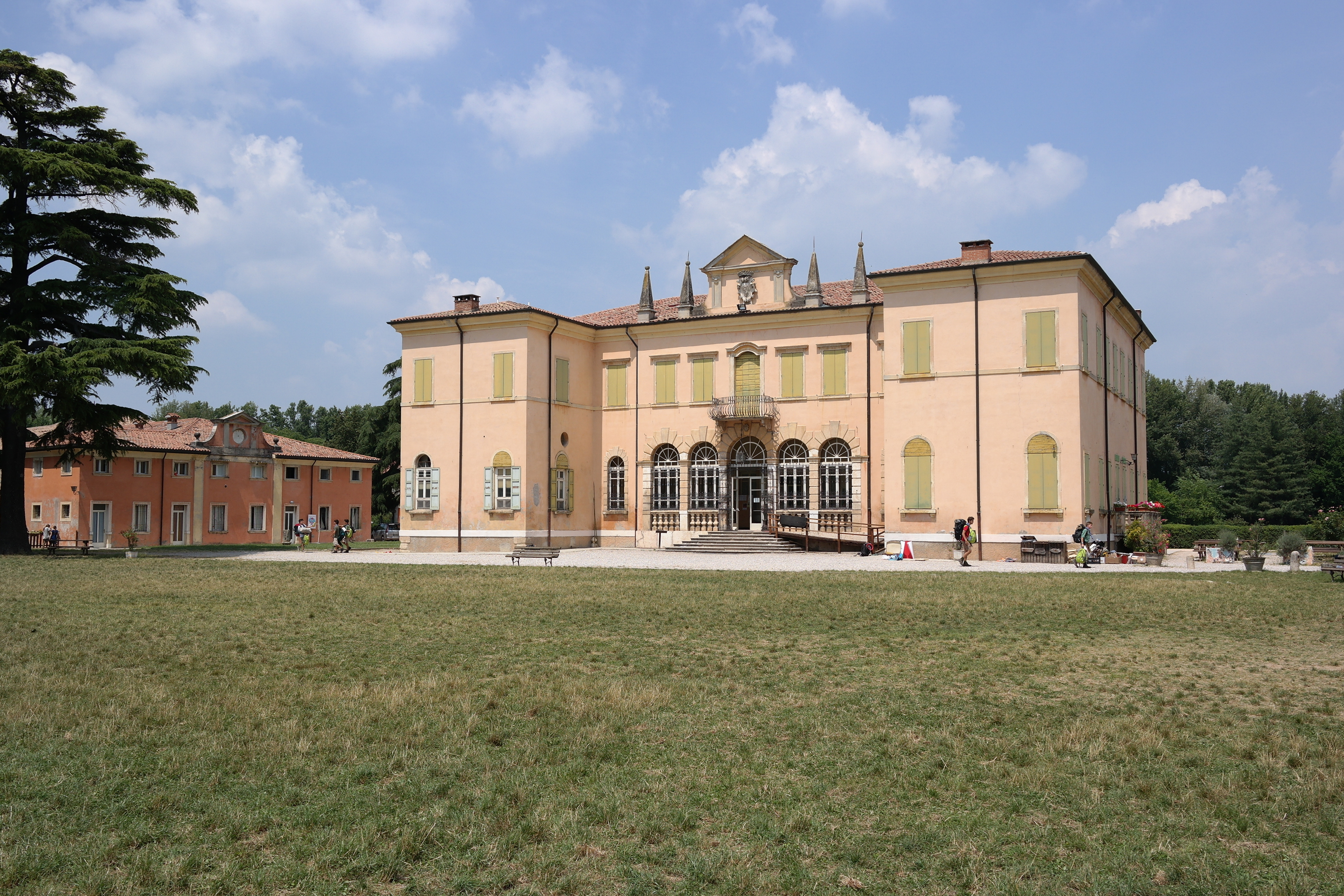
Villa Bernini Buri

Villa Bernini Buri
Villa Bernini Buri, located in the heart of the Adige Park, is one of the most important examples of a Venetian villa in the entire Veronese territory, both for the monumental character of its architecture and for its historical importance, as the structure of the complex has remained unaltered, still preserving, in addition to the manor house, two chapels, the rustic cottages, the stables and the farmer's house. The manor house was richly furnished and frescoed, had a library that also collected manuscripts and parchments, and there were works of art from the Italian tradition (including paintings by the painter and miniaturist Liberale da Verona) and Flemish painters. However, at the end of World War II, in just five days, the villa was ransacked and stripped of all its possessions by the townspeople, who were enraged against the nobility whom they held guilty of the war. The main building was built in the early 17th century to a design by Domenico Brugnoli, a nephew of Sanmicheli.

Other villas

Other villas of special significance in Verona include:

- Villa Malfatti Balladoro is a complex with Baroque features that was built in an isolated position on the slopes of a hill in Valpantena. In addition to the manor house and some rustic buildings there is an oratory built in the 18th century that housed a painting by Paolo Farinati and one by Antonio Balestra, now located in another place;
- Villa Marioni Pullè, a 17th-century building nestled in a park at Chievo, a few steps from the Adige River, designed by architect Ignazio Pellegrini. The monumental complex, well known in Verona, was a place of meetings and gatherings of some of the most important figures in the political and cultural life of the 18th and 19th centuries, so much so that it hosted Joseph II of Habsburg-Lorraine, emperor of the Holy Roman Empire, and Umberto I, king of Italy;
- Villa San Dionigi, or Villa Erbisti Rossi Chiampan, is one of the most important examples of neoclassical architecture in Verona. Its current layout dates back to the 19th century, when the owners decided to demolish the previous building to create the sumptuous new manor house. Inside the park is a 12th-century chapel that was once part of the property of the abbey of San Zeno.

=== Towers ===
Among the towers of special significance in Verona are:

- San Zeno Abbey Tower, a solid, tall crenellated brick tower built in two phases in the 12th century that was part of the San Zeno Abbey. Inside are fine frescoes from the late 13th century, including a particularly famous one in which a procession pays homage to a seated figure on a throne;
- Torre del Gardello is a tall brick building located a few steps from Piazza Erbe, next to Palazzo Maffei. It was built in the 12th century and in the following century was equipped with the city's oldest bell clock, a tribute from the Lord of Verona Cansignorio della Scala, whose chimes began to regulate the public and private affairs of the people of Verona. Today the bell is on display at the Castelvecchio Museum;
- Torre dei Lamberti, built in the 12th century and rebuilt several times until it became the tallest tower in the city, is part of the Palazzo della Ragione complex. In 1295 two bells were installed there that still stand today, the Marangona, which rang the hour of the end of the craftsmen's work and sounded the alarm in case of fires, and the Rengo, which gathered the city council or called the citizens to arms in case of need.

=== Theaters ===
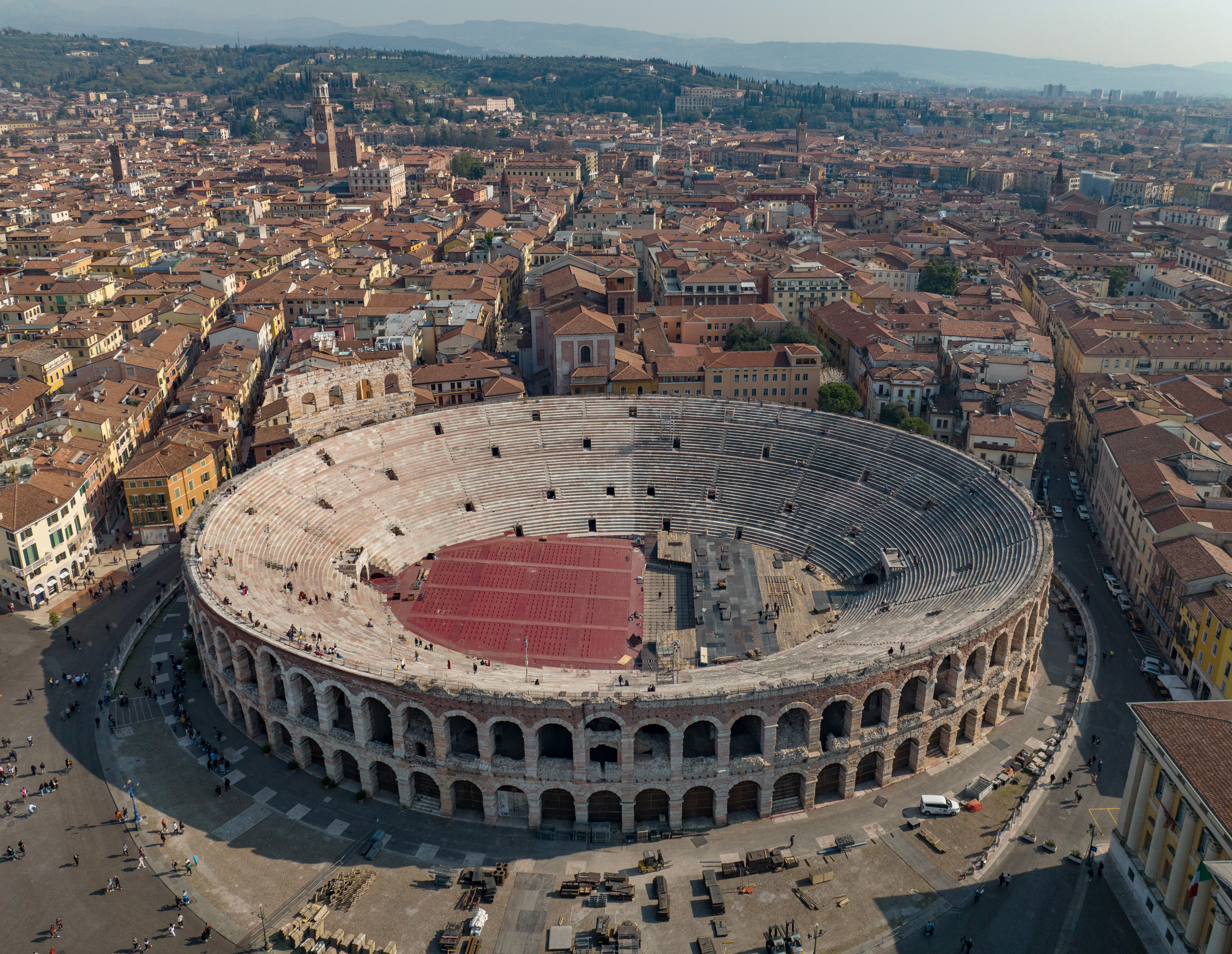
Verona Arena

Verona Arena
The Arena is a Roman amphitheater, now located in the center of the city, in the elegant Piazza Bra, although when it was built, in the 1st century, it was located just outside the city walls. It is the monument that more than any other recalls Verona's Roman origins, so much so that it has become a symbol of the Veneto town throughout the world, along with the figures of Romeo and Juliet. It is one of the great buildings that have characterized Roman architecture and one of the ancient amphitheaters that has come down to us with the best degree of preservation, owing to the systematic restorations carried out since the 16th century; for this very reason, despite the many transformations it has undergone, it allows the visitor to be able to easily understand the structure of this kind of building, strictly subject to the function for which it was intended but nonetheless endowed with an essential beauty. Due to its capacity of 22,000 spectators (which in Roman times even reached 30,000 seats, as it was not the stage, which occupies about a third of the seats, and due to the presence of the portico at the highest part of the cavea), in the summer season it hosts the famous opera festival, whose seasons have been held continuously since 1913, while in the spring and autumn seasons it is a stage for many international singers and musicians. In the past, however, it hosted not only gladiatorial fights and Roman-era shows, but also tournaments and jousts of chivalry, ballets, circuses, plays and even bullfights.

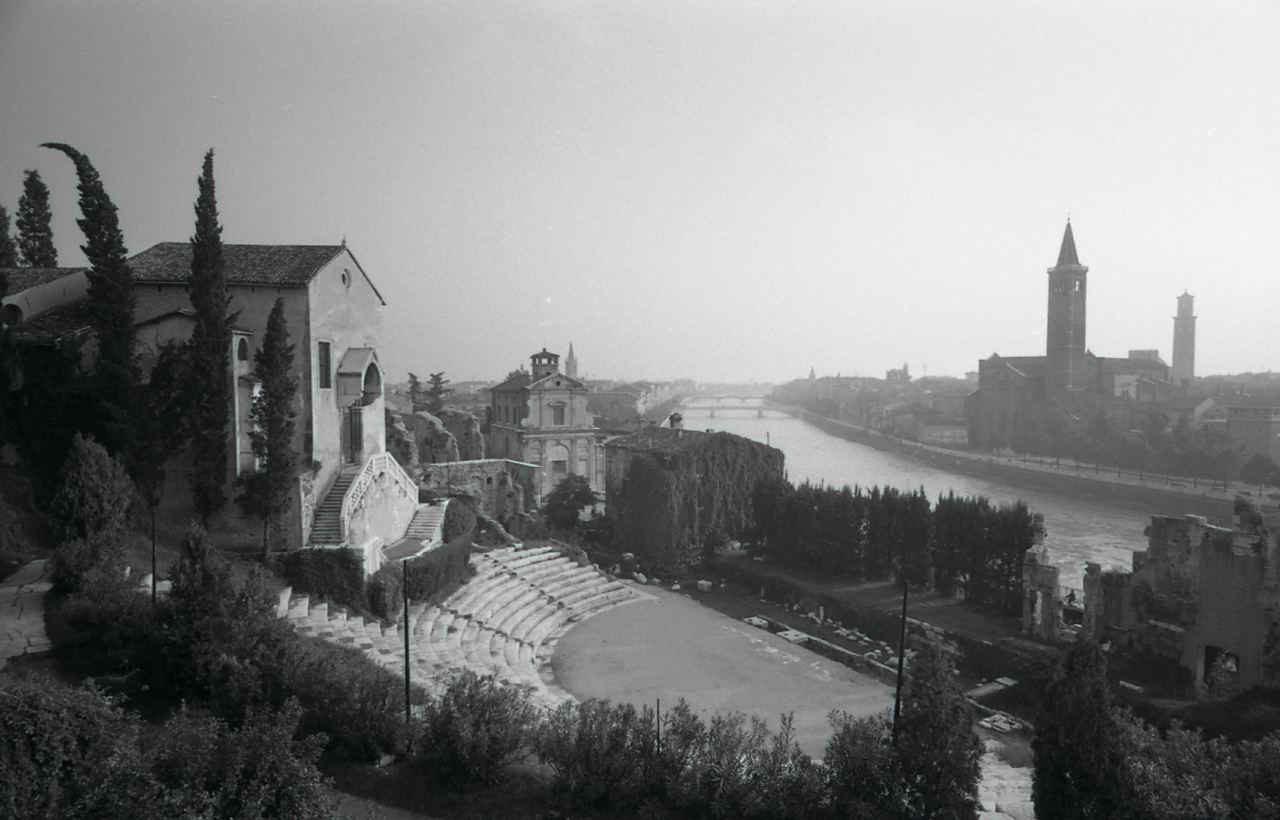
Roman theater

Roman theater
The Roman theater is an open-air theater built in the first century B.C. at the foot of San Pietro Hill, on the left bank of the Adige River. It was part of a plan to monumentalize the entire hill, which became a large urban scene on several levels: along the river bank was the theater building, enclosed on both sides by the lapideus and marmoreus bridges; along the slope were several orders of terraces; and finally at the top of the hill was a Roman temple, the remains of which were discovered during some work at castel San Pietro. During the Middle Ages the building fell into disuse and thus into disrepair, so much so that on its remains a whole neighborhood arose that exploited the structure of the theater itself as a foundation, of which the church of Saints Siro and Libera still remains as evidence. The other buildings were demolished in the 19th century during archaeological excavations and the restitution of the complex that took place thanks to the work of Andrea Monga, a wealthy merchant who dabbled in archaeology. In 1904 the area was finally bought by the municipal administration, which continued the archaeological excavation work until 1914. Under the direction of Antonio Avena, the exhibition itinerary of the city's archaeological museum of the same name was transferred to the large monumental complex, which after restoration shows one of the best-preserved theaters in northern Italy. During the summer season, the building is still used as a theatrical space, and hosts the so-called Veronese theater summer, whose editions have been held continuously since 1948.

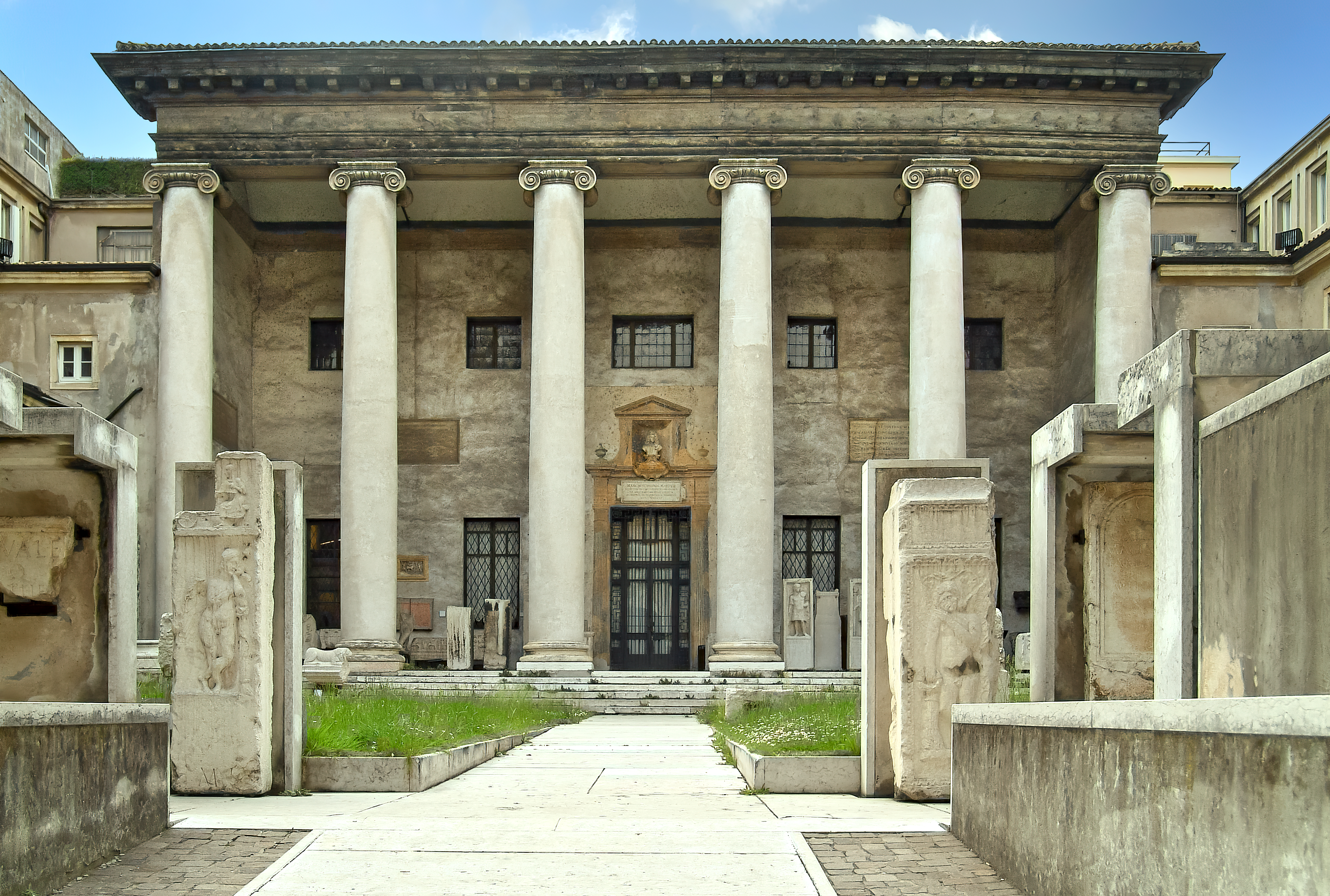
Teatro Filarmonico

Philharmonic Theater
The Teatro Filarmonico is Verona's main opera house, owned since its inception by the Accademia Filarmonica di Verona; it is used by the Fondazione Arena di Verona as the home of the winter opera season. The building was built in the 18th century on the initiative of Marquis Scipione Maffei, as Verona needed a new and stable opera house: the decision was made to build an Italian-style structure, with vast stalls and overlapping tiers of boxes, and the most famous theatrical architect of the time, architect Bibbiena, was called in to design it. The theater was inaugurated on the evening of January 6, 1732, with Antonio Vivaldi's pastoral drama La fida ninfa. The opera season became particularly famous but had to be interrupted in 1749, when a fire broke out in the theater, which had to be renovated. It suffered further serious damage toward the end of World War II, when it was hit by Anglo-American bombing; the building was rebuilt as similar as possible to its predecessor, however, the work was rather lengthy and lasted until 1975, when it was inaugurated with the opera Falstaff, or the three jokes by Antonio Salieri. The same complex houses the Maffeian Lapidary Museum, established in the 18th century, and is considered one of the oldest public museum institutions in Europe.

Other theaters

Other theaters of special significance in Verona include:

- Teatro Nuovo, inaugurated in 1846, is a well-kept and elegant theater but far from the eighteenth-century splendor of the Filarmonico, presenting itself on the outside as an austere neoclassical building and on the inside as an Italian-style theater with three tiers of boxes;
- Teatro Ristori, built around the mid-19th century in place of an earlier wooden theater space. For a long time it was one of the city's main theaters and, after a period of closure, it was reopened in 2012, after restoration work that made it a multipurpose space, so that it could host a variety of types of events, while respecting the original structure.

=== Bridges ===
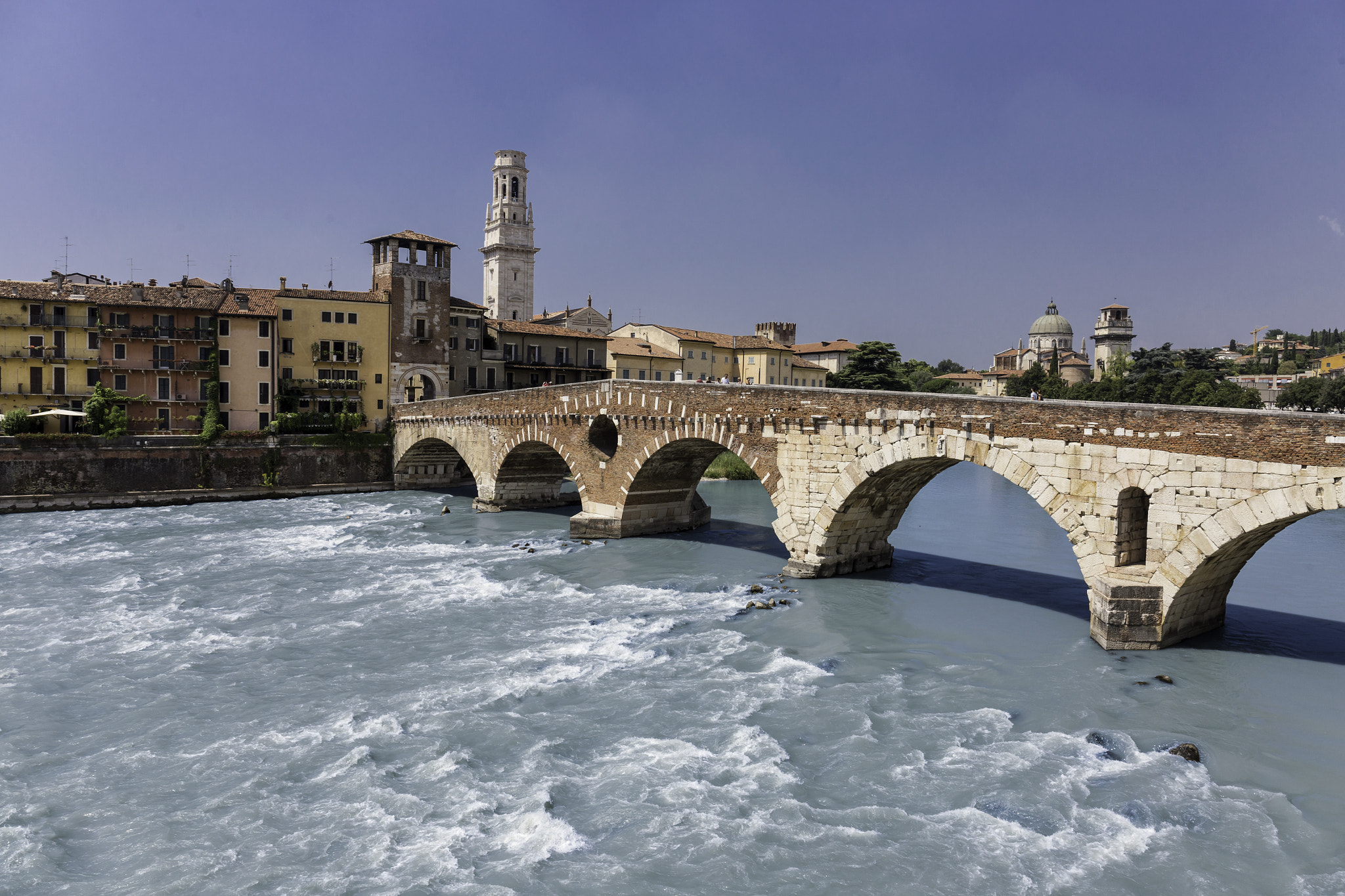
Ponte Pietra

Ponte Pietra
The Pietra bridge is the oldest bridge in Verona, located near the Roman theater, in an area that from prehistoric times must have featured a ford, a crucial meeting point between different communication routes to which the city's birth is due. A first wooden bridge was put in place during the construction of the Via Postumia in 148 B.C. at the same spot where the ford was, later replaced by the stone one, of which the two left arches, made of opus quadratum, have come down to us intact. In the imperial age it underwent a major restoration during which the depiction of a river deity was placed on the keystone ashlar of the second left arch. Much more troubled was the life of the monument in the medieval centuries, when the three right arches suffered damage and partial collapse due to the flooding of the Adige River. In 1298 the Lord of Verona Alberto della Scala had the cityward tower restored and the adjacent archway rebuilt, while in 1508 the City Council commissioned Fra' Giocondo to oversee the reconstruction of the two arches that still needed repairing. However, the bridge suffered its most serious damage on April 24, 1945, when it was undermined and detonated by retreating German soldiers, a blast that left only the cityward archway intact. Superintendent of Monuments Piero Gazzola, supported by the entire public, chose to rebuild the bridge as it was and where it was, thanks to the technical collaboration of Veronese architect Libero Cecchini and the specialized contribution of historians, archaeologists, engineers, university professors, and various other experts and technicians.

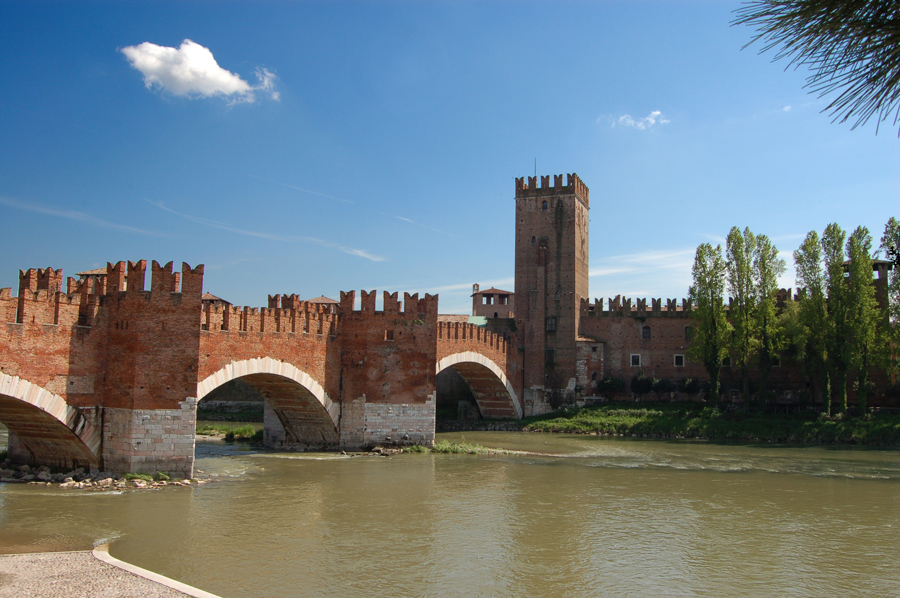
Castelvecchio Bridge

Castelvecchio Bridge
The Castelvecchio Bridge is a three-arched crenellated and fortified structure, an outstanding example of 14th-century military engineering, which was built by Cangrande II della Scala together with the castle of the same name, of which it is a part. With its bold structure it was placed in a strategic position in relation to the castle, on the side of the keep of the fortress and dividing the two main courts. The bridge's sturdiness enabled it to pass through five centuries of history unscathed until the French, following the Treaty of Lunéville, occupied the city in 1802 and decided to chop off the tower on the country side and remove the battlements. It suffered more serious impairment during World War II when, like all the other bridges in the city, it was blown up by the retreating Germans. At the end of the war public opinion pushed for the reconstruction of the bridge, as one of the main identity symbols of the city, so the superintendent a Piero Gazzola decided also in this case, as with Ponte Pietra, to restore it to its pre-blast condition rather than build a bridge from scratch. The reconstruction project was drawn up by engineer Alberto Minghetti and architect Libero Cecchini, supported by a team of specialists.

Other bridges

Other bridges of special significance in Verona include:

- Chievo Dam Bridge is an eight-arch dam located upstream of the city, also serving as a pedestrian bridge. The structure was built in the 1920s for the purpose of raising the water level of the Adige River so that it could enter the Camuzzoni Canal, which begins its course there. The canal is then essential for supplying the hydroelectric power plants and factories that were built during the early industrialization of Verona;
- Ponte del Risorgimento is a bridge built near the Catena tower to celebrate the centenary of the Unification of Italy. It was designed by the well-known engineer Pier Luigi Nervi, who designed a structure with a continuous beam of variable section and shape, which is why the side walls have a double-curved surface, called a hyperbolic paraboloid in geometry, a recurring feature in much of his architecture. The piers, clad in local stone, are shaped like rostrums so as to effectively counteract the action of floods;
- Ponte della Vittoria is a structure designed by architect Ettore Fagiuoli and engineer Ferruccio Cipriani. It owes its name to the Battle of Vittorio Veneto, a victory that led to the defeat of the Austro-Hungarian Empire in World War I. The monumental three-arched bridge features at its ends four bronze equestrian sculptural groups, symbolizing victory, created by Mario Salazzari.

=== Libraries ===
Libraries of particular note in Verona include:

- Chapter Library, one of the oldest and best-known ecclesiastical institutions and libraries in the world, famous because illustrious figures have studied there and because it possesses manuscripts of great importance, including the Ursicinus Codex, which was produced in the library in 517 (making it the oldest library in the world still in operation), and the Veronese Riddle, which would represent a possible birth certificate of the vernacular in Italy;
- Arturo Frinzi Central Library, home since 1987 to the humanities-economics-legal branch of the University of Verona, is located in the church of San Francesco di Paola, built together with the adjacent monastery in 1596;
- Civic Library, established in 1792 and opened to the public ten years later. The larger building that housed it, the deconsecrated Church of St. Sebastian, was completely destroyed, except for the bell tower, by aerial bombing during World War II. The new, modern building was designed by Pier Luigi Nervi and opened on June 2, 1980.

== Military architecture ==
=== Castles ===
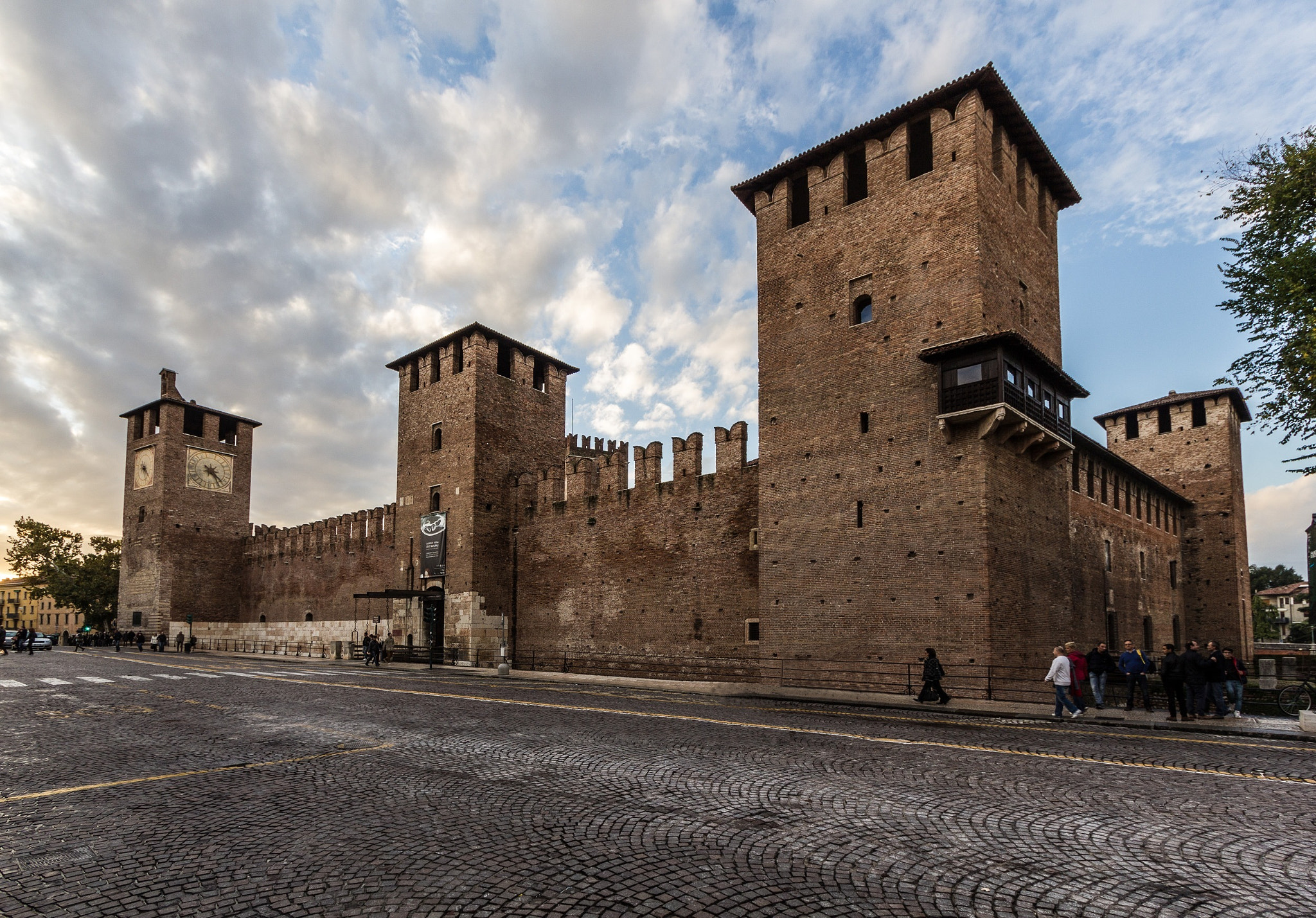
Castelvecchio

Castelvecchio
Castelvecchio, erected in the 14th century by the Lord of Verona Cangrande II della Scala, is the most impressive monument in Verona after the Roman amphitheater Arena. Originally called the castle of San Martino in Aquaro because of the church included inside (it assumed its present name only after two new castles, San Pietro and San Felice, were built on top of San Pietro hill), it is a vast military fortification with high defensive towers, which also had a residential purpose. The complex is divided into two parts by the imposing city walls: to the west is the Scaligeri residence, protected by a narrow courtyard with a double order of walls, at the center of which stands the castle's tallest tower, the keep, from whose side the three-arched fortified bridge of the same name launches out to the other side of the Adige River; to the east, on the other hand, is the rectangular-plan major courtyard, originally intended as the Piazza d'Armi. The complex continued to serve its military function under the Venetian government, during the brief Napoleonic occupation, and finally under Austrian rule, when it was used as a barracks. After hosting the Verona trial of fascist leaders in January 1944 and being bombed during an Allied raid, Castelvecchio underwent a major restoration and museum set-up by renowned architect Carlo Scarpa. The Castelvecchio museum is described as one of the most important works of postwar Italian museography, with valuable arrangements imitated many years later, and houses important collections of medieval, Renaissance, and modern art.

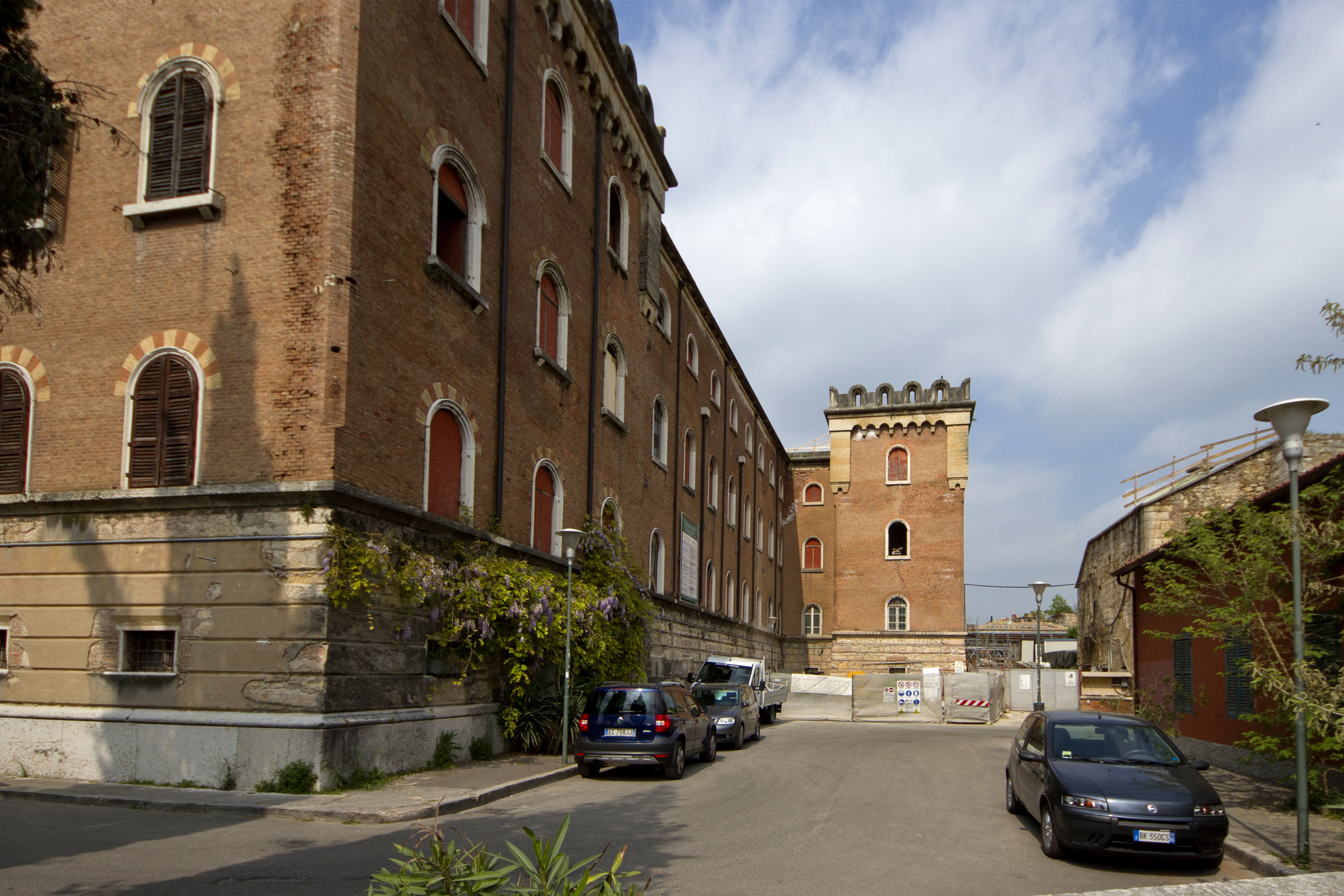
Castel San Pietro

Castel San Pietro
Castel San Pietro is located atop the hill of the same name, rising behind Verona's Roman theater and a short distance from the Adige River and the Pietra Bridge. This hill is strategically located, so much so that it was the place where the prehistoric settlement of Verona developed, moved within the bend of the river only in Roman times. Precisely the importance of the position, dominant over the plain opening to the south, is the cause of the construction of numerous structures over the centuries: a temple was built there in Roman times; a castrum and the church of San Pietro in Castello were built there in the early Middle Ages; an imposing castle was built there at the end of the 14th century, commissioned by the Visconti family, which was reinforced during Venetian rule, surviving until 1801, when Napoleon's troops had it demolished before handing the town over to the Austrians; finally, on the ruins of the earlier buildings, the Habsburg military barracks was built, currently being restored and fitted out to house a museum of the city. The nineteenth-century building recalls, with the presence of the stylized towers and battlements, the forms of medieval fortresses, integrating with the context through the use of building materials typical of historic Veronese construction and architectural elements that recall Romanesque architecture. The forecourt in front of castel San Pietro, which is very popular due to the presence of a large panoramic terrace overlooking the city, can be reached either by a staircase that unravels from the side of the Roman theater or by the Verona funicular, built in the early 20th century.

Other castles

Other castles in Verona include:

- Montorio Castle, a medieval fortress, stands on a hill near the hamlet of Montorio, east of Verona. The origins of the castrum date back to the 10th century, but major modifications were made in the 12th century and especially in the 14th century, under the rule of the Scaligeri, when it was strengthened and enlarged. In modern times it was abandoned and underwent some tampering in the 19th century, so it now appears incomplete;
- Castel San Felice, an Austrian fort built in the 19th century, in place of which stood a castle commissioned by the Visconti family in an elevated position north of the city. The complex is a fortified urban citadel with two bastions, built in two successive extensions, connected to but at the same time autonomous from the magistral walls.

=== City walls ===
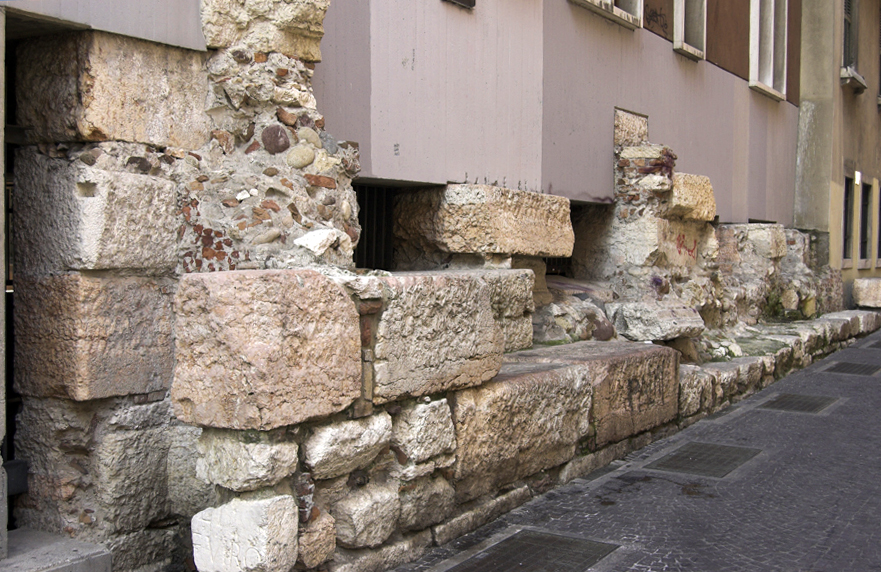
Roman walls

Roman Walls
The Roman walls of Verona were an important defensive curtain equipped with numerous monumental towers and gates, built in several successive construction phases starting from the late Republican age and continuing through the early Roman-Germanic kingdoms. The first phase of construction of the defenses started around the second half of the 1st century BC, following Verona's attainment of the rank of Roman municipium, a second phase of renovation and enlargement of the city walls took place in the 3rd century at the urging of Emperor Gallienus, and finally in a final phase Theodoric the Great, on the beginnings of the 6th century, again strengthened the Roman city defenses, adding a second circle. Of the curtain walls that encircled the built-up area of Roman Verona few visible traces remain, although their layout is still very evident today as the historical fabric grew and developed by leaning against and reusing surviving portions of the walls. Of the late republican walls, in particular, only two sections of brick wall have been found, discovered between the Adige and Porta Borsari and in Via Leoncino, while more conspicuous remains of the imperial walls have been preserved, mainly in Piazza Mura di Gallieno. Of the curtain wall erected by Theodoric, on the other hand, conspicuous ruins remain visible in Via Diaz, in the alleys S. Matteo and del Guasto, in Via S. Cosimo, Leoncino and Amanti streets. Better preserved, however, are the two main gates, Porta Borsari and Porta Leoni.

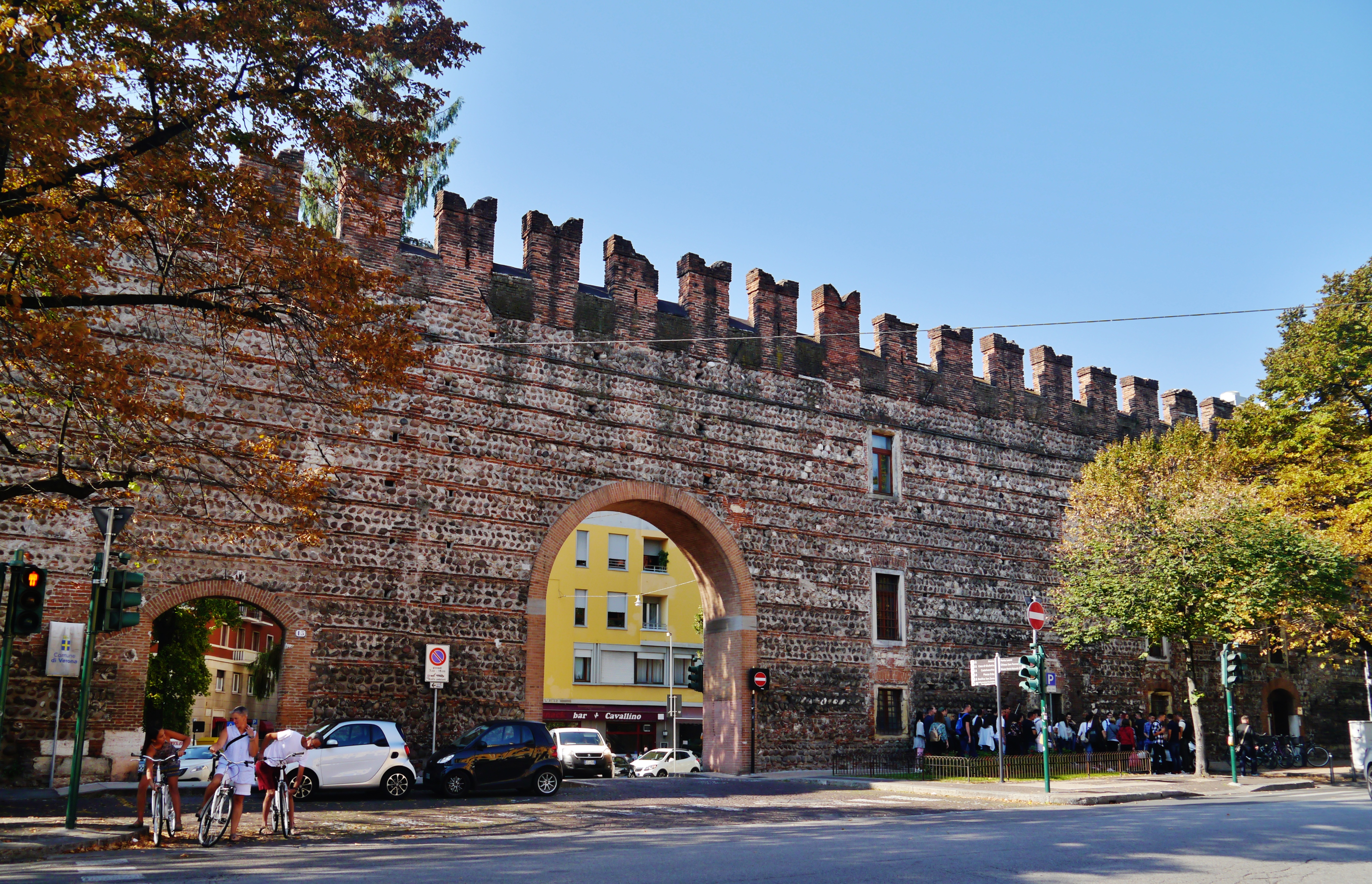
Municipal walls

Municipal walls
The municipal walls of Verona were defensive walls erected to the south of the historic center in the medieval age, near the Adigetto, of which ample traces remain visible along Via Pallone and inside Castelvecchio, while little evidence remains of the various gates that opened in the curtain wall due to the works that led to the enlargement of the fornixes. They were built starting in the 12th century and strengthened during the rule of Ezzelino III da Romano, when they attained a more accomplished arrangement consisting of a wall-antemural-ditch system, thus a type of fortification based on the concept of gradual defense. With the enlargement of the magistral curtain wall carried out by Cangrande I della Scala, it slowly came to lose its strategic importance, and this extraordinary historical relic of Veronese military architecture was transformed over the centuries into a logistical system of military buildings. The system of military buildings is similar to a large arsenal with linear development, in which the buildings took on different purposes: barracks, hospital, powder magazine, mill, granary, bakery, stable, and warehouse. The ideal center of the great military system became the palace of the Grand Guard, whose vast portico would be used to review troops while the main floor would house the military academy, although it was never finished.

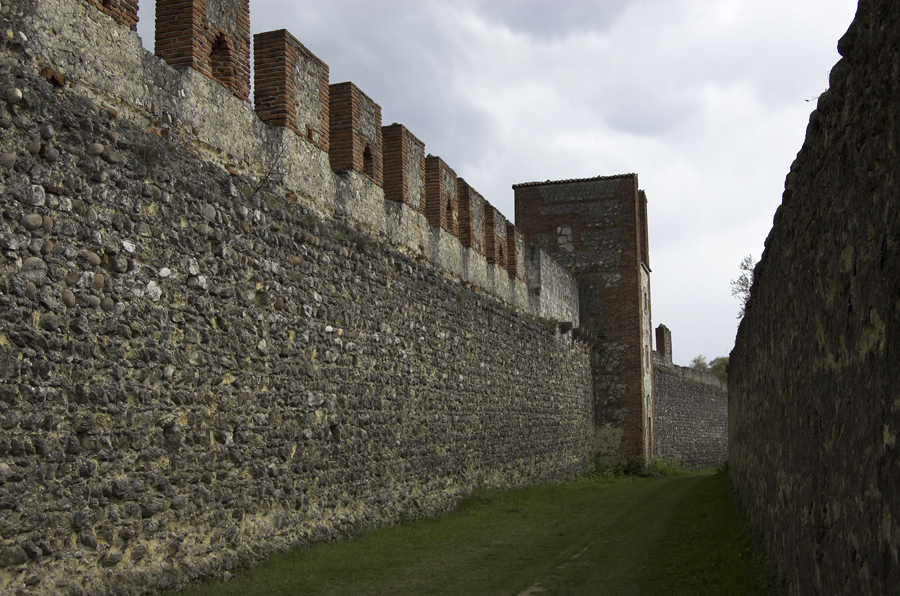
Scaliger walls

Scaliger walls
The Scaliger walls of Verona were a curtain wall, the hillside portion of which still survives, built during the rule of the Della Scala family, Lords of Verona in the 13th and 14th centuries. The walls were commissioned by Cangrande I della Scala to the architect Calzaro, as an inscription dated January 1325 informs, who thus had the city's fortifications expanded after the first interventions carried out by Alberto I della Scala between 1287 and 1289. Due to this radical intervention, all the ancient and populous suburban neighborhoods were able to dismantle their individual defenses, becoming definitively part of the city's fabric, defended by mighty walls that conferred great prestige on Verona. Two centuries later, during the rule of the Serenissima, the previous curtain wall was reinforced through the construction of thick scarp walls and the building of several bastions, circular and polygonal, making the fortifications more suitable for the introduction of gunpowder. In the 19th century there was a further restoration of the Scaliger hill wall by the Austrian Genie Direction, with the removal of part of the battlements and the lowering of the towers, yet the medieval fortifications were not altered, and they survive in similar forms to the original ones and are in a good state of preservation.

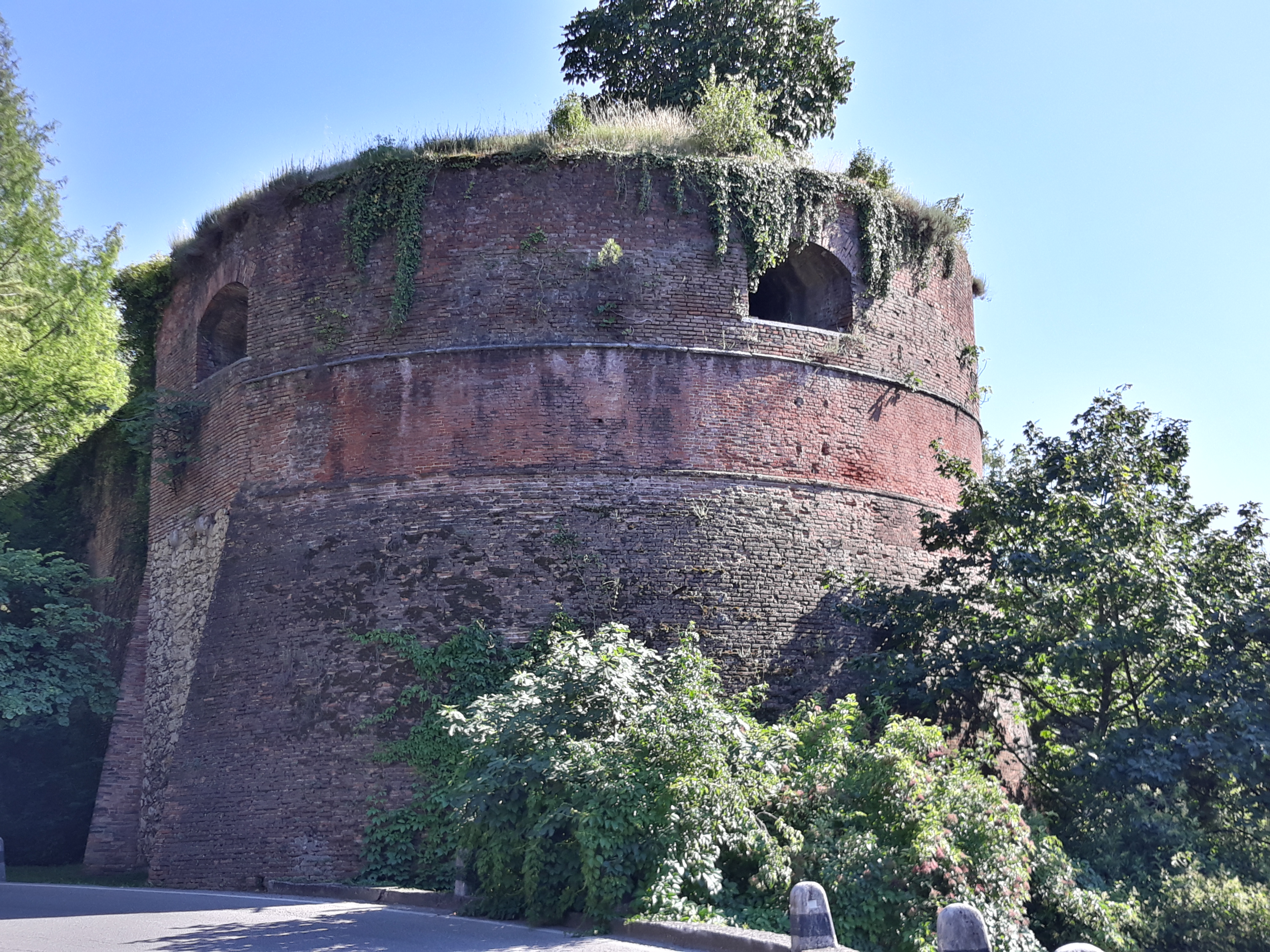
Venetian walls

Venetian walls
The Venetian walls of Verona were an important defensive curtain wall equipped with numerous bastions and monumental gates, commissioned by the Venetian Republic to adapt the previous Scaliger curtain wall to the introduction of gunpowder, given Verona's strategic importance. It was particularly the war of the League of Cambrai that demonstrated that the old walls were no longer sufficient and that a complete overhaul of the defensive system was necessary. This was carried out starting in 1530 on the plans of the well-known Veronese architect Michele Sanmicheli when he officially assumed the appointment of superintendent of the military factories of Verona, a position he held until his death, while at the same time carrying out a harmonious and functional renewal of the city's urban structure. Sanmicheli bequeathed to the city a vast and articulated bastioned wall as well as the monumental gates of San Zeno, Palio and Nuova, defined by Giorgio Vasari as among the most beautiful in Italy. At the beginning of the 19th century, during the Napoleonic wars, all the bastions of the right Adige wall were demolished by French troops, except for those of San Francesco and Spagna, located near the river, upstream and downstream of the city: those lost were then rebuilt with a different technique during Austrian rule, a few years after the end of the war.

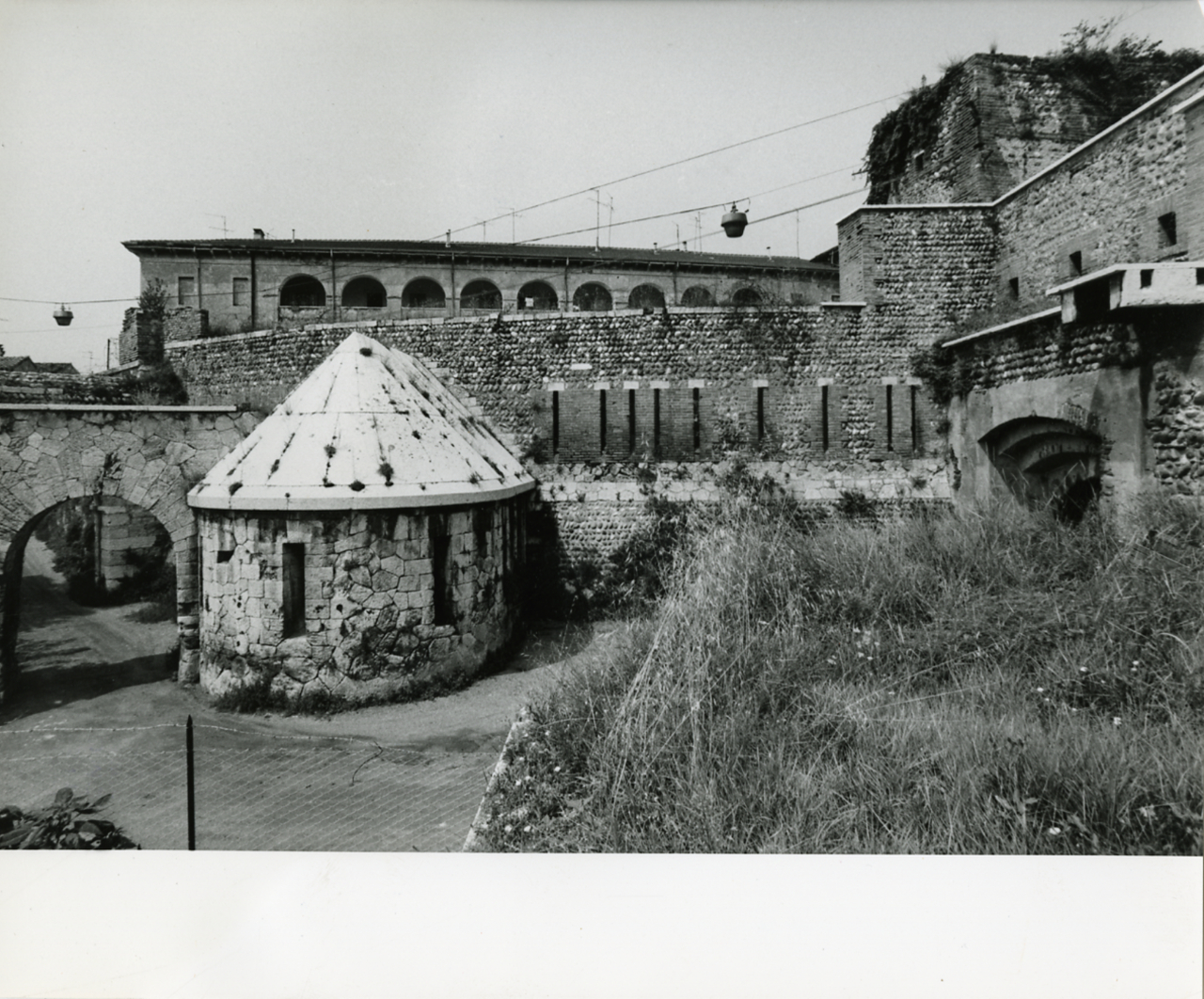
Austrian walls

Austrian walls
The Austrian walls of Verona, also known as the magistral walls, are the system of bastioned curtains and monumental gates surrounding the city of Verona in their present state, forming part of a complex city defense system that also consists of a series of fortifications, entrenched camps, storehouses and barracks, both outside and inside the city. The final shape of the magisterial wall derives from the enlargement and restructuring, carried out in the 19th century during the Austrian rule of the Kingdom of Lombardy-Venetia, of the entire system of fortifications inherited from the medieval period, in the hilly area, and modern, in the plain area. The Scaliger and Venetian defensive walls had suffered major damage and demolitions during the Napoleonic wars and, in particular the Venetian bastions, therefore had to be restructured, also in accordance with the new military disciplines and tactics that had made obsolete the defensive criteria that had been previously pursued: the project and works were entrusted in 1831 by Field Marshal Radetzky to Franz von Scholl, the major representative of the new military architecture of the Austrian Empire. He applied, for the reconstruction of the magisterial wall, a conservative view of the ancient fortifications, which were reused to the greatest extent possible and minimized masonry work. The urban wall, in its final arrangement, has a development of more than 9 kilometers and occupies almost 100 hectares with its works, towers, washers, ramparts, moats, embankments, to which must be added the works of the external defense system, located in the flat countryside or on the hillside, that is, the 19 existing military forts (of the 31 that had been built), which formed the last and most modern system of city defense.

=== Gates ===
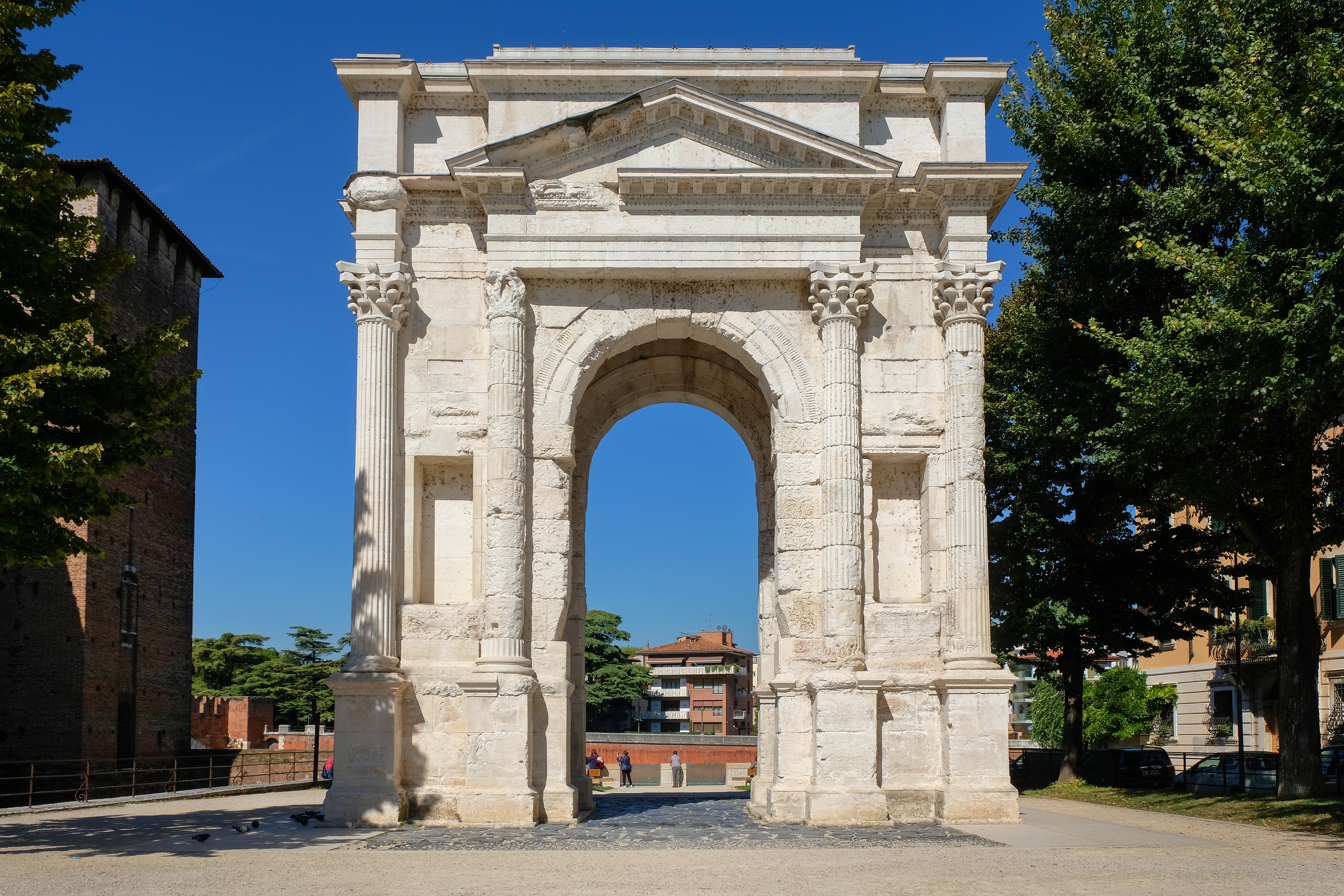
Arco dei Gavi

Arco dei Gavi
The arch of the Gavi, located along the ancient Via Postumia just outside the Roman city walls, is a very rare case of an honorary and monumental arch for private use in Roman architecture; it was built around the middle of the first century to celebrate the gens Gavia. During the Renaissance this was one of the most highly prized of Verona's antiquities, partly due to the presence of the signature of a Vitruvius, evoking the well-known Roman architect and author of the treatise De architectura. The monument was then described by humanists and antiquarians, reproduced in detail and studied in its proportional ratios and decorations, and finally taken up as a model by architects and painters, such as Palladio, Sangallo, Serlio, Falconetto, Sanmicheli, as well as Bellini and Mantegna. It had great influence on Veronese art in particular, being copied as an overall scheme for the realization of portals, altars, and chapels in the main churches of Verona. The arch no longer stands in its original position as it was demolished by the French Army Corps of Engineers in 1805, however, the numerous reliefs that had previously been produced made it possible for it to be reassembled by anastylosis and restored in 1932, when it was relocated to the small square at the side of Castelvecchio.

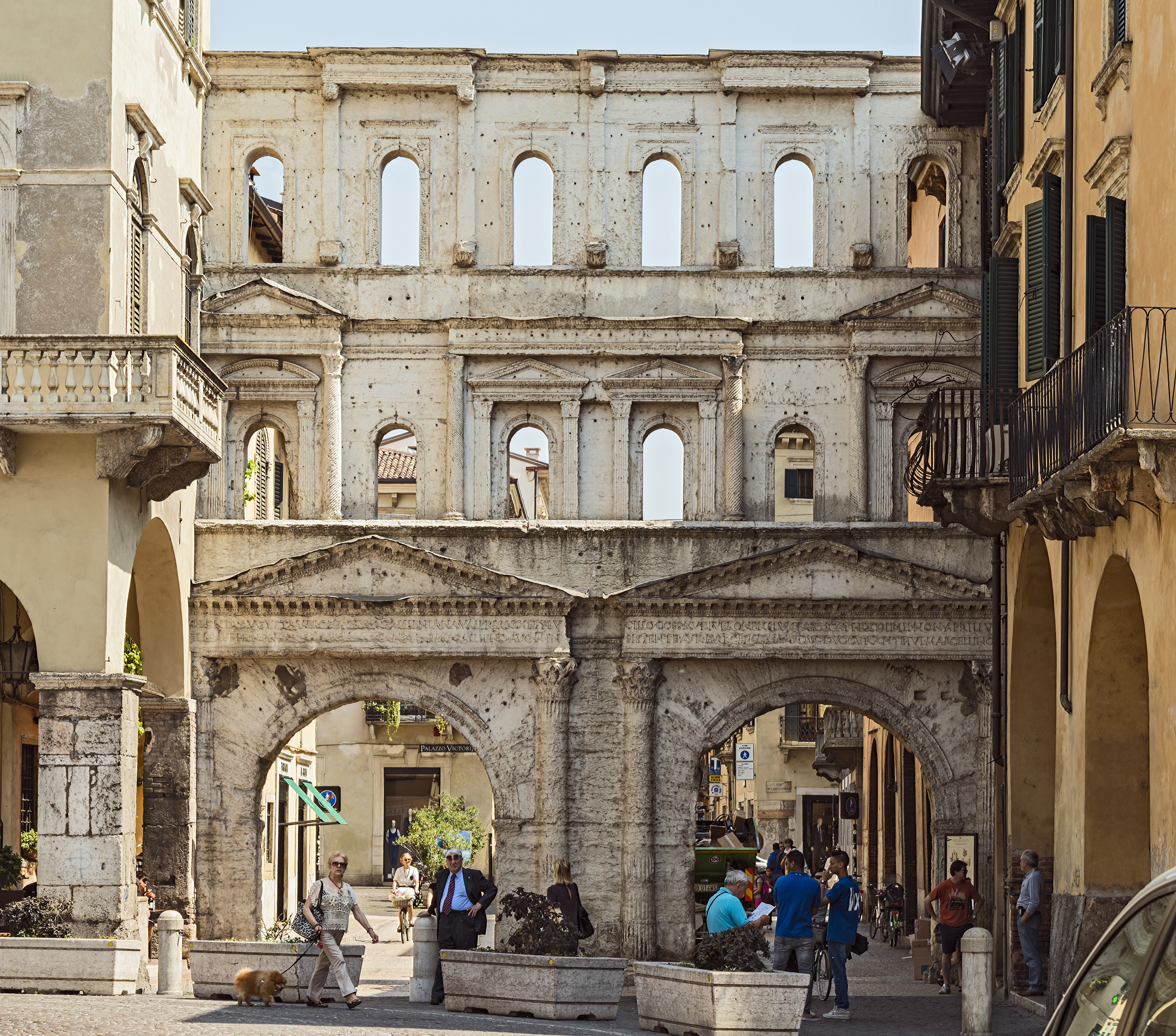
Porta Borsari

Porta Borsari
Porta Borsari, in antiquity known by the name Porta Iovia due to the presence of the nearby temple dedicated to Jupiter Lustral, is one of the gates that opened along the Roman walls of Verona. It constituted the main entrance to the Roman city, entering the important Via Postumia on the decumanus maximus, corresponding to today's Corso Porta Borsari and Corso Cavour. The construction of the structure dates back to the second half of the 1st century B.C., however, over the centuries the gate has undergone several alterations and to date only the agro facade of the imperial age, dating from the first half of the 1st century, has survived. The façade, made of white Valpantena stone, has on the lower floor two fornixes framed in aedicules and set on a high plinth, and above these are two more floors, each with six windows framed by fine decoration.

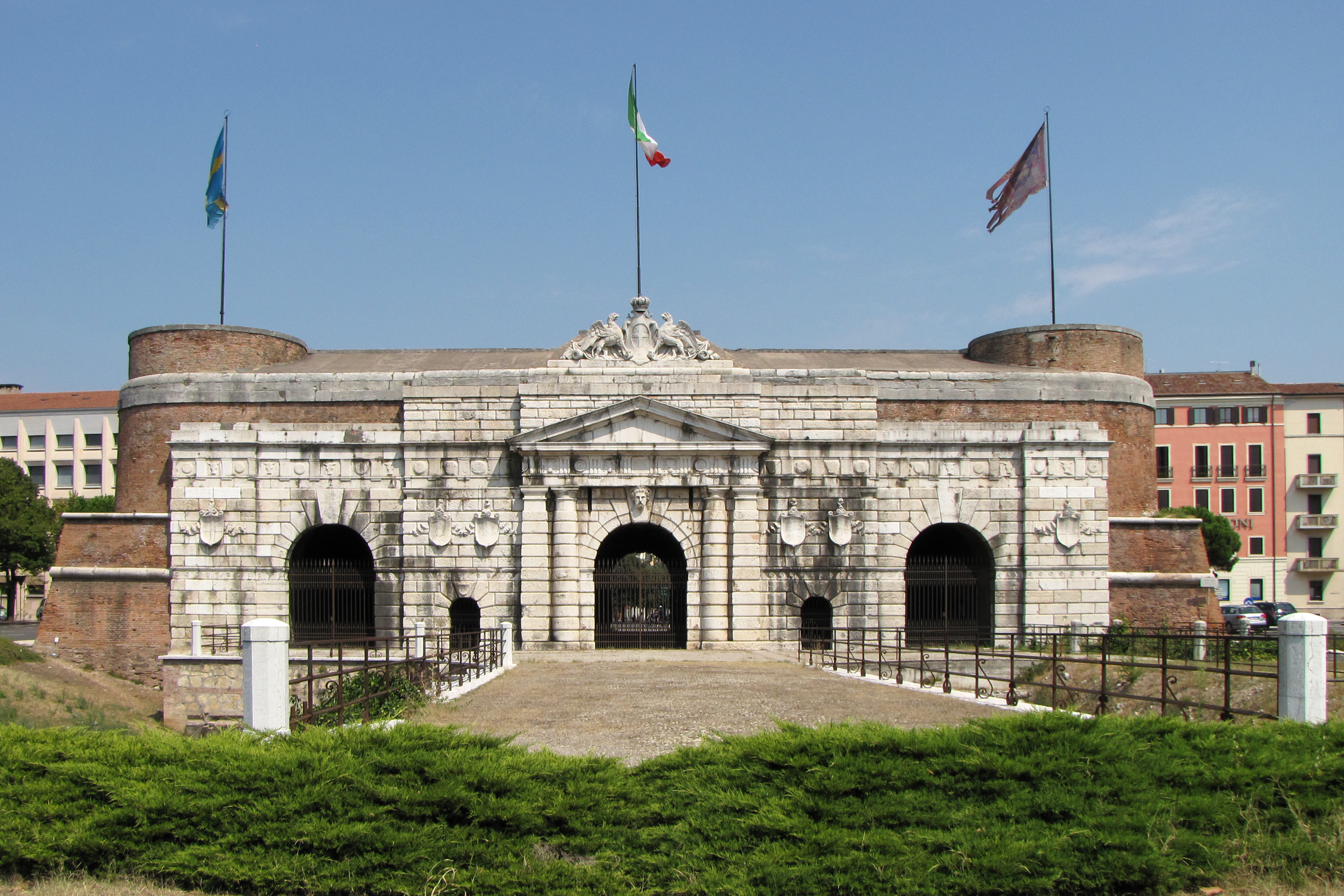
Porta Nuova

Porta Nuova
Porta Nuova (New Gate) is a monumental gateway erected between 1532 and 1540 to a design by architect Michele Sanmicheli as part of a major renovation of the city's southern walls; it was highly praised by Giorgio Vasari, who asserted that there had never before been another work of greater magnitude or better design. Situated between the bastion of the Holy Trinity and the bastion of the Reformed, it was in this area that Sanmicheli had the opportunity to enact a new urban planning conception of Verona, which had as its focal point precisely Porta Nuova, which gave access to a long straight street, the Via della Porta Nuova, which led directly, through the gates of the Bra, to the Arena and the heart of the city. The present form of the gate is similar to the original Sanmichelian one, although during the Austrian occupation it underwent considerable alterations, particularly in the facade towards the countryside, where the two lateral arches were added. The work recovers some elements from the architecture of ancient Rome, especially from Veronese antiquities: the Arena of Verona, for the use of the Doric order and rustication; the arch of Jupiter Ammon, evoked through the use in the keystone of the central arch of the main facade of the face of Jupiter Ammon, a symbol alluding to power, royalty, and strength; the older facade of Porta Leoni, for the use of the running dog frieze.

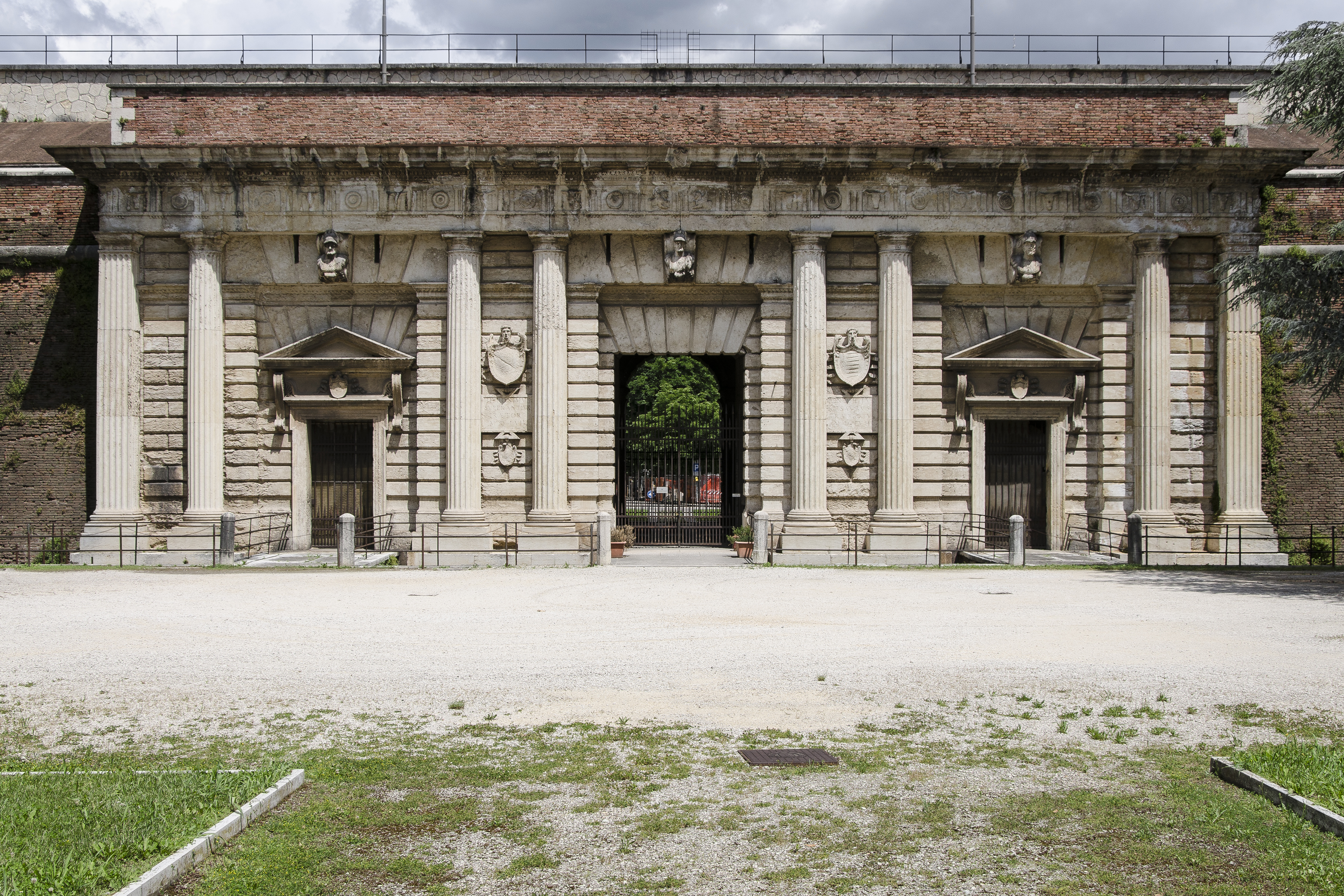
Porta Palio

Porta Palio
Porta Palio is a monumental gateway erected between 1550 and 1561 to a design by architect Michele Sanmicheli. This Sanmichelian gate is the most notable monument born of Renaissance research on the theme of triumph in the city gate, as well as being the most extreme architectural manifestation of the policy of munire et ornare. The gate, inserted in an almost central position in the curtain wall between the bastion of San Bernardino and the bastion of Santo Spirito, has two very different elevations: the elevation towards the countryside takes on a monumental scale and an almost sumptuous approach, despite the fact that the gate was meant to fulfill a military function, so much so that the architect took as a reference the elevation of one of the terraces of the Roman theater in Verona; conversely, the elevation toward the city, articulated as a portico with five arched openings terminated by large projecting keystones and divided between them by pairs of Doric half-columns, is stern, the wall surface not lightened by decoration as in the façade toward the countryside and completely covered, including the half-columns, with rough ashlar. Such a stern rear façade contrasted with such a sumptuous front façade can be explained by the theory of architect and theorist Sebastiano Serlio: the gate was meant to mark the boundary between the city and the countryside, so from within the city it was meant to appear as the work of nature, while from the countryside it was meant to appear as the work of man's hand.

Other gates

Other gates of special significance in Verona include:

- Portoni della Bra are a two-arched gate built along Verona's municipal walls in order to connect Piazza Bra, where the Roman amphitheater stands, to what was then the suburban countryside. The double-quadrant clock installed between the two fornices was donated by Count Antonio Nogarola and inaugurated in 1872;
- Porta Leoni is one of the gates that opened along Verona's Roman walls. Built in the first century B.C. and renovated in the following century, it connected the city's maximum hinge with the vicus Veronensium, that is, with the branch of the Via Claudia Augusta that continued to Hostilia. The inscription found above the median pylon during restoration work is considered the birth certificate of Roman Verona;
- Porta San Giorgio, whose countryside-facing front was built between 1525 and 1526 to a design by Giovanni Maria Falconetto, configured according to the classical triumphal arch scheme, but with the unusual binary juxtaposition of architraved side portals. The part facing the city, however, remained unfinished and was completed in the 19th century under Austrian rule;
- Porta San Zeno, inserted in the curtain wall between the bastion of San Procolo and the bastion of San Zeno, was built in 1542 to a design by Veronese architect Michele Sanmicheli. The elevations take up the classical composition scheme of the triumphal arch, with a central round-arched major archway and two square side portals;
- Porta Vescovo, sandwiched between the Maddalene bastion and the Santa Toscana washer, was built in the Venetian era in Renaissance style and was heavily renovated during the years of Austrian rule with additions in neo-Romanesque style, with a vaguely medieval appearance, particularly in the elevation facing the city.

=== Buildings ===
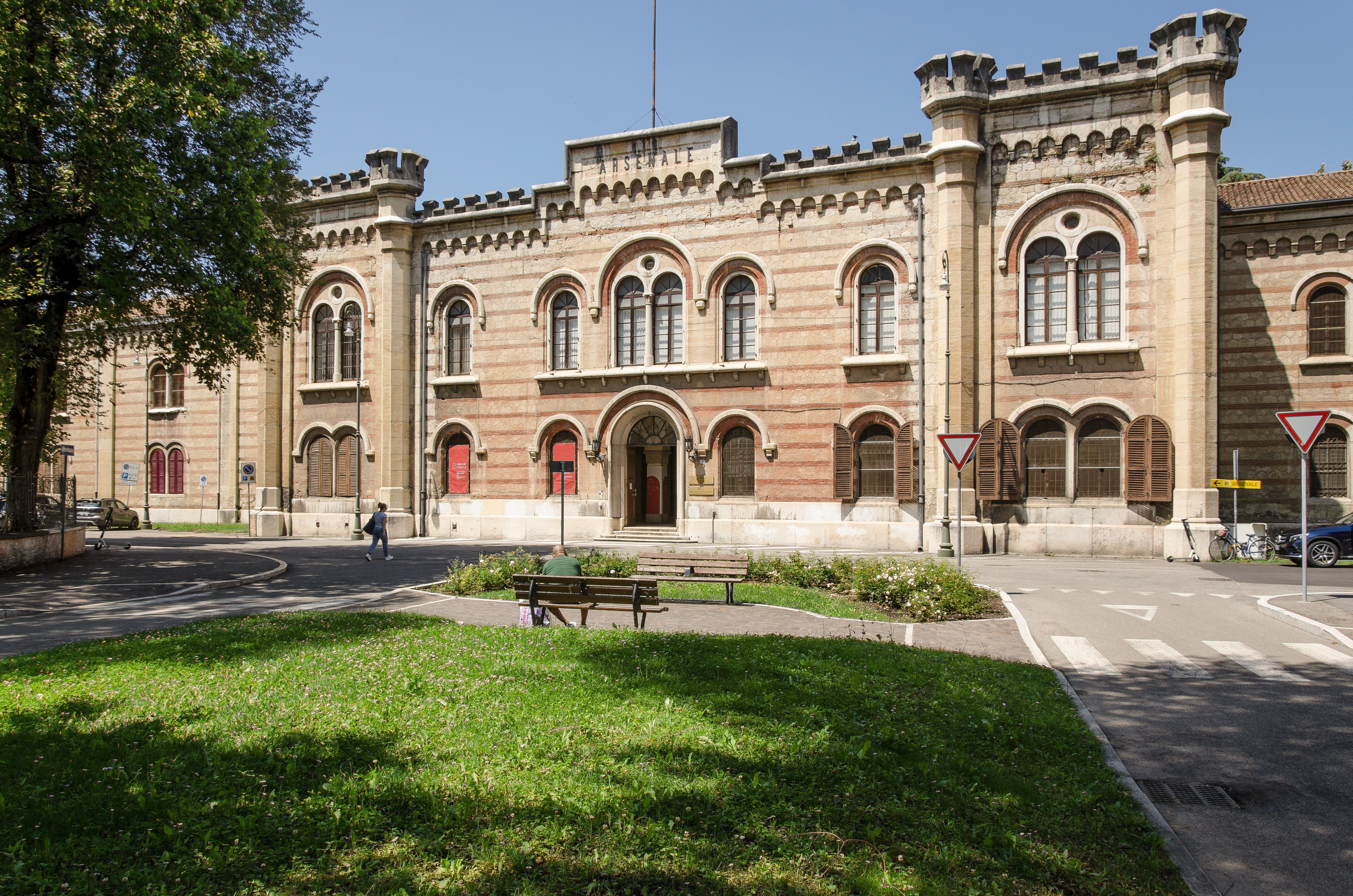
Franz Josef I Arsenal

Austrian Arsenal
The Franz Josef I arsenal was built in neo-Romanesque style around the middle of the 19th century by the Austrians, during the years of imperial rule over the Kingdom of Lombardy-Venetia, thus at a time when Verona assumed the role of a strategic military fortress. The complex, located in axis with the Castelvecchio bridge and consequently a short distance from the castle of the same name, fits coherently into the context of the Scaliger fortress, taking on almost the appearance of a medieval castle, with decorative details reminiscent of Romanesque architecture and materials typical of Verona's building style. The arsenal stands on a very large area and has a plan layout similar to that of the Arsenal in Vienna: the layout is organized along axes with large courtyards separating the nine buildings that contained warehouses, storerooms, and workshops surrounded by greenery, all included within a defensive enclosure.

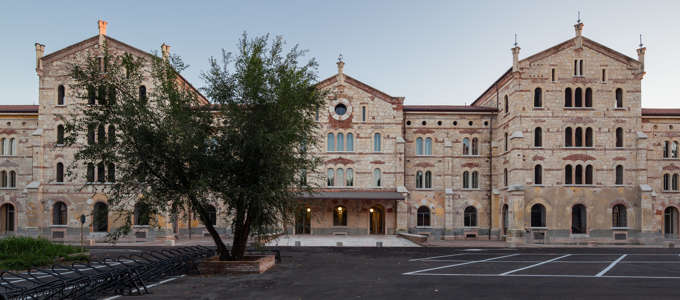
Provianda of Santa Marta

Provianda di Santa Marta
The Provianda of Santa Marta is a complex of industrial archaeology located in the Veronetta district, designed in the 19th century by the Austrian Genie Direction in neo-Romanesque style and built in the second half of the same century. The complex was originally intended for the production of bread and biscuits, storage and administration of other livelihoods for the imperial army stationed in northern Italy, while today it houses the departments and library of economics of the University of Verona. The location that was chosen was based on the wide availability of space at this location, the proximity to the Verona Porta Vescovo station and the possibility of a direct connection to it, and the protection provided by the magistral walls.

== Archaeological sites ==
Notable archaeological sites in Verona include:

- Verona Forum, the center of the political and economic life of Roman Verona. Over the centuries this space was slowly transformed, the Roman buildings giving way to medieval and modern ones, thus taking on the connotation and current name of Piazza delle Erbe. The square was overlooked by the Capitolium, the foundations of which can be visited located in the cellars of Maffei Palace, the Curia, some structures of which remain inside a restaurant, and the Basilica, evidence of which has been lost due to the heavy renovation of the ancient Jewish ghetto;
- Domus of Castelvecchio, a domus from the Roman period, probably arranged on several levels of terraces between the Adige and the Via Postumia, which was found during the redevelopment of the garden at the center of which is the arch of the Gavi. The most interesting element, a mosaic floor, was removed during the archaeological excavations and is preserved inside the Castelvecchio Museum, while the rest of the building has been covered over;
- Domus of Piazza Nogara, one of the best-preserved examples of private Roman buildings in Verona and northern Italy. It was built in the first century B.C. and renovated between the second and third centuries, when mosaics were added and are excellently preserved. The remains are located in the underground rooms of the headquarters of the Banca Popolare di Verona;
- Roman villa of Valdonega, a Roman villa built in the 1st century in a suburban hillside area. Three rooms of the building have been preserved, overlooking a porticoed space, likely open to the garden;
- Hypogeum of Santa Maria in Stelle, an underground structure built in the 3rd century that is difficult to interpret. It is unclear whether it served the function of a funerary complex, aqueduct, or nymphaeum, although from the next century it was adapted as an early Christian chapel for religious worship, remaining in use until the 12th century;
- Lazzaretto of Verona, built in the 16th century and designed, according to Giorgio Vasari, by Veronese architect Michele Sanmicheli. It was placed in an isolated location accessible by river and completed in time for the terrible plague of 1630, which killed more than half of Verona's population. The complex is in a state of ruins and only the central temple remains intact, due to some explosions that occurred during World War II, when it was used as an explosives storehouse.

== See also ==
- Verona
- Verona defensive system
- Verona Arsenal
