= Via Gallica =

Ancient Roman road in northern Italy

The Via Gallica was an ancient road of northern Italy which connected the Roman municipia of the Pianura Padana. It started from the Via Postumia next to Verona, and connected Brescia (Brixia), Bergamo (Bergamum) and Milan (Mediolanum), passing near Lake Garda.

In the first section of the road in Verona, existed a Christian necropolis, on which later the Abbey and the Basilica of San Zeno were erected.
