= Palazzo Canossa, Verona =

Palace in Verona, Italy

Coordinates: 45°26′25″N 10°59′23″E

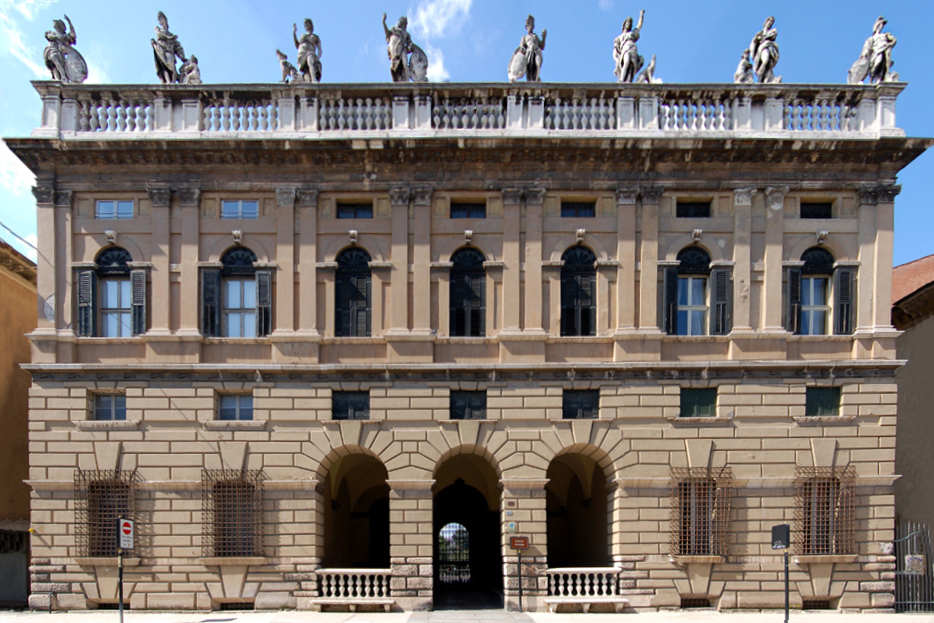
Palazzo Canossa.

Palazzo Canossa is a palace in Verona, northern Italy.

It was erected by commission of the Marquises of Canossa to architect Michele Sanmicheli in 1527, not far from the Arco dei Gavi and the Castelvecchio.

Palazzo Canossa is in Mannerist style, with the entrance preceded by a notable portico. One of the ceilings had frescoes by Gian Battista Tiepolo, but they were lost during the bombings of Verona during World War II.

In its history, the palace housed important figures such as Tsar Alexander I of Russia, Napoleon Bonaparte and Emperor Francis I of Austria.
