= Troiani =

Troiani is a surname. Notable people with the surname include:

- Don Troiani (born 1949), American historical painter
- Giovanni Battista Troiani (1844–1927), Italian sculptor
- Luigi Troiani (born 1964), Italian rugby player
- Maria Caterina Troiani (1813–1887), Italian charitable worker
