= Porta San Zeno, Verona =

Porta San Zeno was a gate or portal of the former outer medieval walls of the city of Verona, Italy. It was designed and built during 1542 by the architect Michele Sanmicheli.

The structure resembles the gate Sanmicheli designed for another city ruled by Venice, Zara in Dalmatia. The building around the gate has served as the offices of the Carnival of Verona.
