= Arco dei Gavi, Verona =

Ancient Roman triumphal arch

Coordinates: 45°26′24″N 10°59′20″E

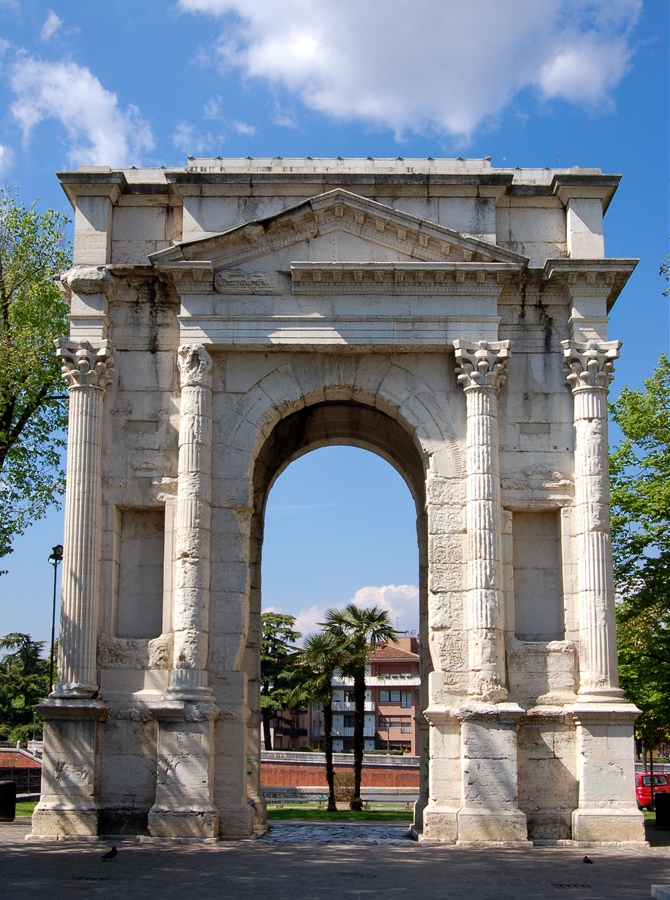
The Arco dei Gavi

The Arco dei Gavi is an ancient structure in Verona, northern Italy, situated at the beginning of the Via Postumia, just outside the Roman walls of the city. Built to celebrate the gens Gavia, a noble Roman family who had their hometown in Verona, the Arco dei Gavi is a very rare example of a privately funded monumental Roman arch.

During the Renaissance the arch was one of the most admired monuments in Verona, being described by humanists and antiquarians, who studied in detail the proportional relationships and decoration of the structure. The arch served as inspiration for many architects and painters, such as Andrea Palladio, Antonio da Sangallo the Younger, Sebastiano Serlio, Giovanni Maria Falconetto, Michele Sanmicheli, Giovanni Bellini and Andrea Mantegna. It had a particularly pronounced influence on the architecture of Verona itself, serving as a model for the construction of portals, altars and chapels in the churches of the city.

The arch no longer stands in its original position, as it was demolished by French military engineers in 1805, however, the numerous surveys that had previously been produced made it possible to reassemble it by anastylosis, a process completed in 1932. Subsequently, it was relocated to the small square of Castelvecchio, where it is still located today.

== History ==
The Arco dei Gavi was commissioned by the prominent Gavi family and built by architect L. Vitruvius Cerdo in the first half of the 1st century AD, likely during the reign of Augustus, or at the latest in the early years of Tiberius' reign. The arch was once interpreted as a funerary monument or cenotaph, owing to its location along the Via dei Sepolcri, however, its function was most likely the same as that of many other provincial arches: as a symbolic monument of municipal liberties, customarily erected on some occasion of great importance to the city.

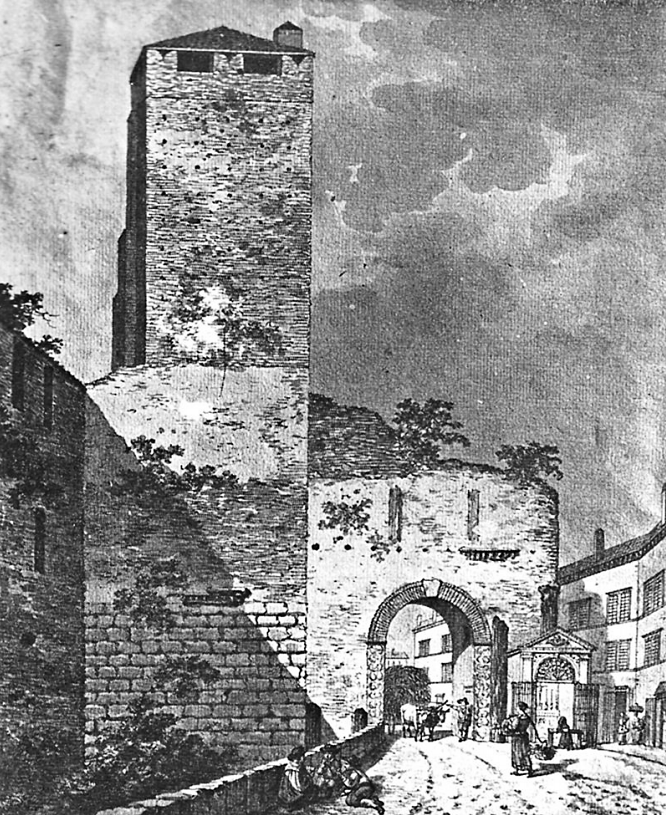
Drawing by an unknown 18th century artist, depicting the arch in its original position, next to the Castelvecchio tower

Erected along the Via Postumia as an isolated monument, it was later stripped of its decorative elements and incorporated into the new city walls, which were built from the 12th century along the north side of the Adigetto depression, from the current Ponte Aleardi to the fortification that stood on the site of the Castelvecchio. The arch therefore changed its function, being used as a city gate, with the name of Porta di San Zeno. During the rule of the Scaligeri, the arch was incorporated into the defensive system of the Castelvecchio, constructed during the second half of the 14th century. The integration of the structures was extensive - one side of the arch was partially incorporated into a clock tower, while the other supported a walkway that passed over the ancient monument. There was even a guard post in the interior of the arch. This change in function resulted in the partial destruction of the top of the structure, removed to accommodate the chemin de ronde of the castle.

It was only during the rule of the Republic of Venice, which financed the construction of the Venetian Walls, that the arch finally lost its function as a fortified gateway to the city. The arch remained, however, an important waypoint on the route from the new Porta Palio to the heart of the city. In 1550, the Republic of Venice sold the structure and surrounding land, including two shops that had opened within the arch, to private individuals. The new owner decided to reveal the ancient structure by demolishing the medieval walls and adjacent huts that surrounded the arch, after which new buildings were constructed at a respectful distance.

In 1805, during the Napoleonic occupation, French military engineers dismantled the arch to improve security and traffic flow in the area. The stone elements and decorations of the arch were surveyed in detail to aid in any future reconstruction, after which the blocks were dismantled and dumped in the Piazza Cittadella, where some were damaged or removed before being safely stored under the arches of the arena. The basement part of the structure, on the other hand, was not removed as it had been buried over the centuries and was therefore not an obstacle to traffic. Meanwhile, in 1812, the Veronese architect Giuseppe Barbieri had all the individual stone ashlars modeled in wood on a reduced scale, after which he reassembled the miniature arch with great care. This wooden model, which is now kept in the archaeological museum at the Roman theatre, would have been particularly valuable for subsequent restoration works.

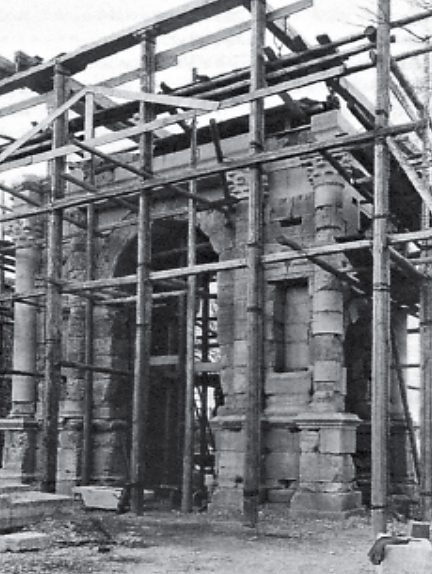
Photograph showing the reconstruction work on the Arco dei Gavi underway, 1932

The idea of reconstruction was raised for the first time in 1920 by the Inspector of Historical Monuments, Antonio Aveva, although the proposal soon led to controversy about the location and methodology of the reconstruction. After years of proposals, it was finally decided to reconstruct the arch using anastylosis, using as much of the original material as possible, and to locate the arch in the piazza next to the Castelvecchio. The project was approved in 1931, overseen by Aveva and Carlo Anti, while the missing attic level was redesigned by Ettore Fagiuoli, who based it on drawings by Andrea Palladio and the surveys carried out before the disassembly in 1805. The arch was finally inaugurated on October 28, 1932, as part of the celebrations for the tenth anniversary of the March on Rome.

In 2011, during some works at the foot of the monument, the so-called domus of Castelvecchio was discovered, whose best-preserved element, a polychrome mosaic floor with a geometric decorative motif, was placed in the Boggian Room of the Castelvecchio Museum.

A stone contained an inscription stating: Lucius Vitruvius Libertus or Cerdon Lucius Vitruvius architect. Later scholars often mistook this for someone with an link to the famed architect Vitruvius. The flanking niches appear to have held statues of family members.

=== Patronage ===
It is highly likely that Verona served as the hometown of the prominent Roman family, gens Gavia, which gained recognition in various Italian cities during their era. Some of the family's notable members are recorded on an engraved loggia within the Roman Theatre of Verona, and their legacy is commemorated by an inscription that attests to the construction of an aqueduct through the bequest of a gens Gavia member. Additionally, the Gavi arch, named after the aforementioned family, stands as a testament to their influence, as evidenced by the accompanying dedication inscription: CURATORES L[ARUM] V[ERONENSIUM IN HONOREM ...] GAVI CA... DECURIONUM DECRETO.

On the pedestals of the niches, which originally contained the statues of the patrons, the names of four members of the Gavia family were indicated: the still legible names are those of Caius Gavio Strabo, Marco Gavio Macrone (both sons of a Caius Gavio) and Gavia, daughter of Marco Gavio; a fourth name has been lost. The almost complete loss of the main inscription in the frieze of the entablature, however, prevents us from knowing who financed the construction of the arch, whether it was the municipality or, as appears more probable, members of the Gavia gens.

=== Architect ===
The architect left his signature in two inscriptions on the inner face of the pillars, which allows us to know his name, an extremely infrequent case in Roman architecture. The Latin inscription reads: L(UCIUS) VITRUVIUS L(UCI) L(IBERTUS) CERDO ARCHITECTUS. The double signature was designed to be read both when entering and leaving the city, implying the architect was so famous that the municipality permitted or even requested his double signature. The rediscovery of the name of the Roman architect, probably thanks to Andrea Mantegna, who reproduced the epigraph inside the Ovetari Chapel in Padua, was a pivotal moment for artists and architects of the Renaissance era. This was also due to the arch's appeal to the prevalent taste and architectural rhythm of the time, which differed from other Veronese monuments, such as the nearby Iovia gate.

== See also ==
- List of Roman triumphal arches

== Sources ==
- Anti, Carlo; L'arco dei Gavi a Verona, in Architettura e Arti decorative. Rivista d'arte e di storia, II, Milano-Roma, Bestetti e Tuminelli, luglio-agosto 1921, pp. 121-138.
- Bertolazzi, Angelo; L'arco dei Gavi, una storia urbana, in ArchitettiVerona, vol. 01, n. 96, Verona, Ordine degli Architetti Pianificatori Paesaggisti e Conservatori della provincia di Verona, gennaio/marzo 2014, pp. 52-56.
- Beschi, Luigi; Verona romana. I monumenti, in Verona e il suo territorio, vol. 1, Verona, Istituto per gli studi storici veronesi, 1960, SBN IT\ICCU\PUV\0229597
- Bolla, Margherita; Verona romana, Sommacampagna, Cierre, 2014, ISBN 978-88-8314-771-5.
- Buchi, Ezio and Cavalieri Manasse, Giuliana; Il Veneto nell'età romana: Note di urbanistica e di archeologia del territorio, II, Verona, Banca Popolare di Verona, 1987, SBN IT\ICCU\FER\0058621
- Cavalieri Manasse, Giuliana; Gli archi di Verona romana: un sistema di indicatori viari, in ArchitettiVerona, vol. 03, n. 118, Verona, Ordine degli Architetti Pianificatori Paesaggisti e Conservatori della provincia di Verona, luglio/Settembre 2019, pp. 56-63
- De Aloe, Ilaria; Modello di innovazione, fonte di ispirazione: l'arco dei Gavi, in ArchitettiVerona, vol. 01, n. 96, Verona, Ordine degli Architetti Pianificatori Paesaggisti e Conservatori della provincia di Verona, gennaio/marzo 2014, pp. 57-59.
- Longo, Elisa; Mazzucco, Katia and Rodella, Federica, Materiali per lo studio dell'arco dei Gavi a Verona, in La Rivista di Engramma. La tradizione classica nella memoria occidentale, n. 66, September/October 2008. URL accessed on 16 October 2019.
- Tosi, Giovanna (1983). L'arco dei Gavi. L'Erma di Bretschneider. ISBN 88-7062-530-3.
