= Michele Sanmicheli =

Venetian architect and urban planner (1484–1559)

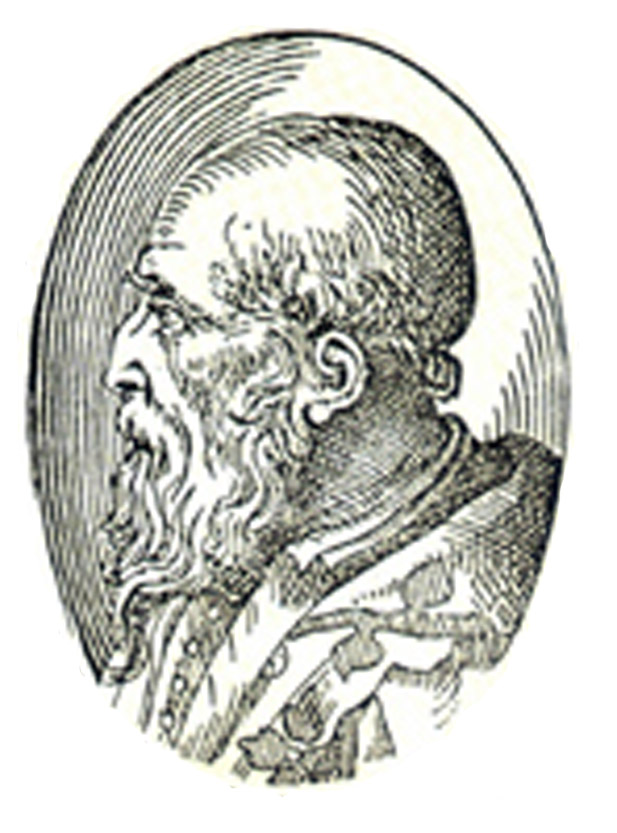
Portrait of Michele Sanmicheli found in Giorgio Vasari's The Lives of the Most Excellent Painters, Sculptors and Architects

Michele Sanmicheli, sometimes transcribed as Sammicheli, Sanmichele or Sammichele (Verona, 1484 (Note: There is no certainty about the date of his birth. Vasari reports 1484, while architectural historian Giulio Sancassani, through a study of his father's will, concluded that the date of birth had to be some time after 1486 and no later than 1488. In Vasari (1568, ch. Vita di Michele San Michele architettore veronese), and Sancassani (1976, pp. 76–90).) - Verona, 1559), was an Italian architect and urban planner who was a citizen of the Republic of Venice.

After staying in Rome to complete his education studying the art of Bramante, Raphael, Sansovino, and Sangallo, he returned to Verona, where he received numerous prestigious commissions throughout his life.

Hired by the Serenissima as a military architect, he designed numerous fortifications in the vast Venetian republic, thus ensuring a great reputation for himself. His works can be found in Venice, Verona, Bergamo, and Brescia, and he worked extensively in Dalmatia, in Zadar and Šibenik, Crete, and Corfu. Due to his sojourns in the latter locations he was probably the only Italian architect of the 16th century to have had the opportunity to see and study Greek architecture, a possible source of inspiration for his use of Doric columns without bases.

A tireless worker, in addition to constructions of a military nature he was also involved in the design of palaces and religious architecture of great value.

== Biography ==
=== Childhood ===
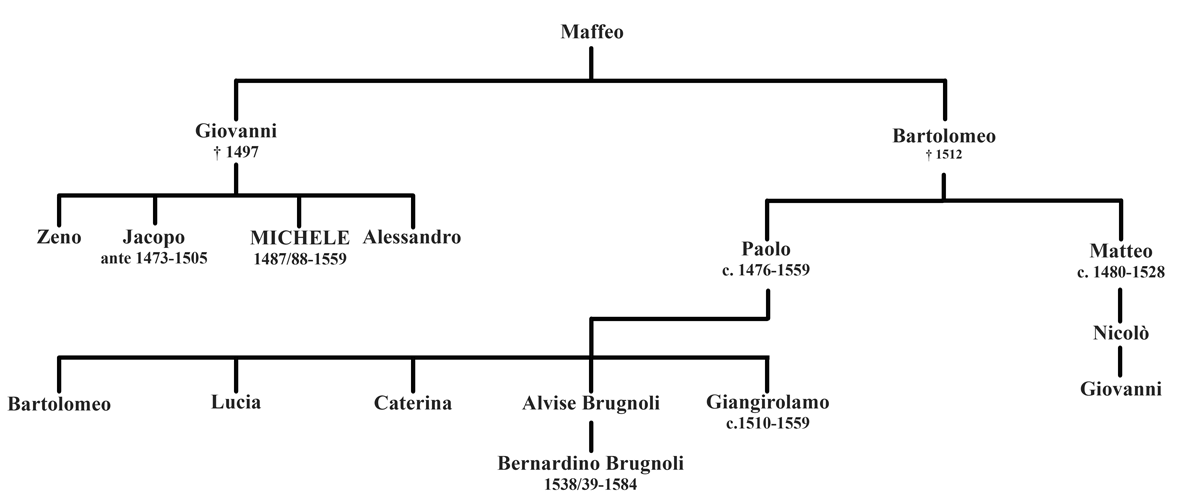
Family tree of the Sanmicheli family

Much of the information about Michele Sanmicheli's life is known through his first biographer, Giorgio Vasari, who wrote about the Veronese architect in his famous work Le vite de' più eccellenti pittori, scultori e architettori, though providing scant information for the entire period of his training between Verona and Rome.

Sanmicheli was born in Verona, at that time part of the Republic of Venice. He learned the basics of his profession, along with his brother Jacopo (who died young) and his cousin Matteo Sanmicheli, from his father Giovanni and his uncle Bartolomeo, both stonemasons in Verona, originally from Cima, a hamlet of Porlezza on Lake Ceresio, or Lugano. The family workshop was a simple artisan's workshop, albeit in contact with several high-quality ateliers. Probably Michele was also able at a young age to acquire intellectual stimulation from his family's acquaintance with Bernardino and Matteo Mazzola, stonemasons and humanists, with whom they collaborated on the construction of the Loggia del Consiglio.

Toward the end of 1505 the young Sanmicheli was already orphaned of both parents while one brother, Jacopo, was close to death, and another brother, Alessandro, was locked in a convent in Bologna. This situation gave him little reason to stay in his hometown and so, having sold some family properties in Azzano, he decided to move to Rome.

=== First commissions in Rome and Orvieto ===
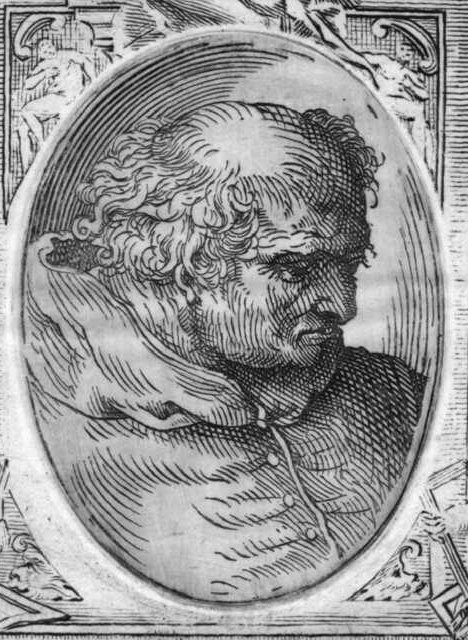
Donato Bramante was an architect who greatly inspired Sanmicheli

Sanmicheli went to Rome at a young age (in his early twenties), (Note: Vasari estimates the move to Rome to have been in the 1500s, but according to newly ascertained information that shifts the date of his birth to a later date, the correct date can be assumed to be around 1505.) to work as an assistant to Antonio da Sangallo. In the Urbe, where he was probably able to move because of the support of two of his brothers, who held prominent positions in the congregation of the Canons Regular of St. Anthony, he had the opportunity to study classical sculpture and architecture. In Rome he also frequented the architect and inlayer Fra Giovanni da Verona, who was active at the papal court, and the circle of the Bramanteschi. He soon won praise, so much so that Vasari wrote that "in a short time he became, not only in Rome, but throughout all the places surrounding it, renowned and famous."

In 1509 he then went to Orvieto, (Note: Vasari wrote in this regard, "Because of his fame, the people of Orvieto brought him with honorable stipends to be architect of their highly regarded temple." In Vasari (1568, ch. Vita di Michele San Michele architettore veronese).) where he stayed for the next two decades. In 1512, a great opportunity presented itself to him: he was offered the role of master builder at the construction site of the Orvieto Cathedral, a position that allowed him not only to supervise the work of one of the major works of central Italy, but also to be the successor to a dense array of great architects who had previously taken part in the project. This assignment brought him great prestige, and the experience he gained from it, especially in the management of the workforce, would prove most useful when, in the future, he was put in charge of the re-fortification of the Venetian state.

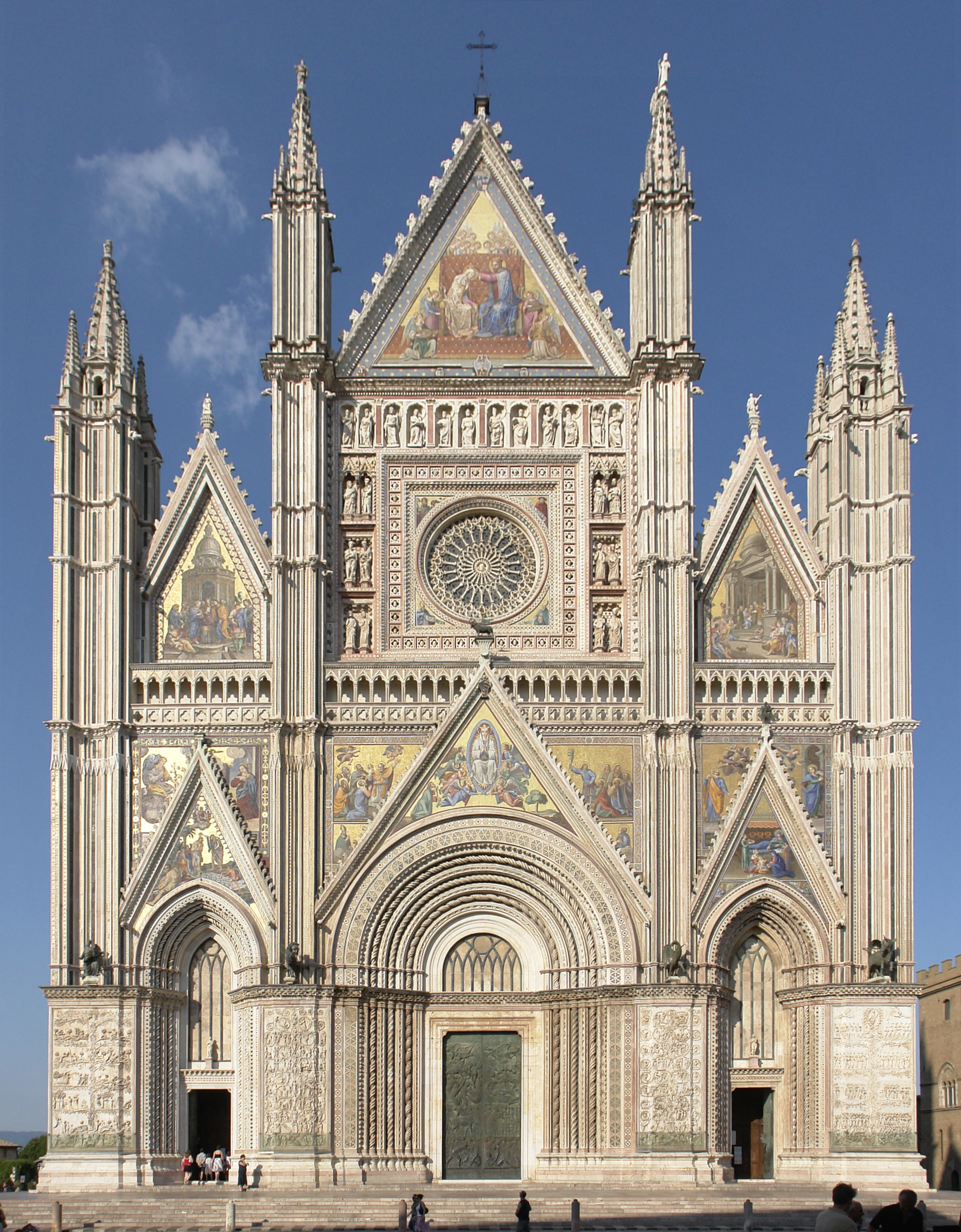
Façade of Orvieto Cathedral, in the construction of which Sanmicheli collaborated as master builder

Also in 1512, under the title of "marmoraio," he went to Rieti as a guarantor in a dispute over a payment to a Florentine sculptor, while in 1516 he traveled to Spello for an estimate of the ciborium kept in the collegiate church of Santa Maria Maggiore.

Due to the fame he gained from being master builder at the cathedral, Sanmicheli was able to obtain some important private commissions, as for example, on April 19, 1516, when he was commissioned by the Sienese merchant Girolamo Petrucci in Orvieto for the family chapel in the church of San Domenico, on which he worked until 1524 and which became one of his most important works.

Between 1525 and 1526 (Note: Perhaps as early as 1521.) he worked to prepare, on the commission of Cardinal Alessandro Farnese, the first design of the Montefiascone Cathedral, an octagonal building surmounted by a dome in the style of Bramante, reminiscent of the one in the church of Santa Maria di Loreto in Rome. Only the colonnade with entablature remains of this building, due to the fire of 1670 and the subsequent radical renovation by Carlo Fontana. During his time in Montefiascone he also had a love affair of which he did not speak much but which led to the birth of a daughter.

In early 1526 he carried out, at the behest of Clement VII, a survey of the fortifications of the northern borders of the Papal States, which were under threat from Charles III of Bourbon, which was followed by a detailed report signed with Antonio da Sangallo the Younger. (Note: The two went as far as Veneto. In Puppi (1986, pp. 101–107)) From the existing sources it is not immediately clear why the pope turned to Sanmicheli rather than another person for such a delicate assignment; perhaps it was given to him on the recommendation of Cardinal Alessandro Farnese or, more likely, at the behest of Antonio da Sangallo himself. This assignment represented a further turning point in his career in that he thus had the opportunity to visit the most advanced military architecture and to associate with the most highly regarded architects and engineers of the time, who greatly influenced him in his way of designing.

=== Return to Verona and assignment at the Serenissima ===
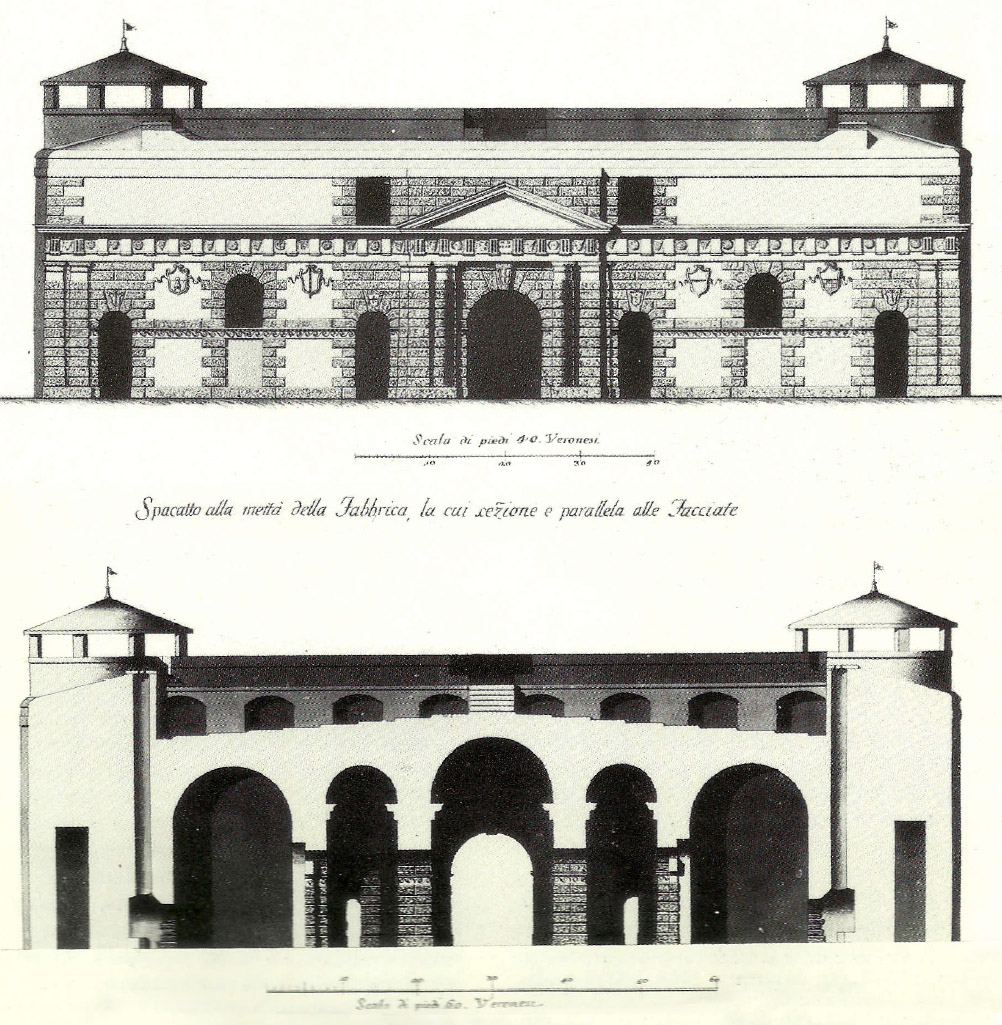
City-side facade and section of Porta Nuova in Verona

After finishing his service for Clement VII Sanmicheli decided to return, in 1527, to Verona: Vasari wrote that the "desire came to Michele after so many years to see again his homeland and his relatives and friends, but much more the fortresses of the Venetians." After spending a few days in his hometown, he went to Treviso and Padua to study their military architecture. Of his stay in the city of Padua, there is a legend that he was placed under arrest on suspicion of espionage activities, given his great interest in defensive structures. (Note: No definite information is available, however. In Sandrini & Brugnoli (1988, p. 164).) On a subsequent stay in Legnago for the renovation of the fortress, he met the captain general of the Venetian Republic, Francesco Maria della Rovere, whose acquaintance, as well as the fame he had now acquired, meant that he was offered the position of military engineer for the Serenissima. Thus, in the same way as Jacopo Sansovino, he became a salaried officer of the Republic: his acclaim among the Venetians and the tragedy represented by the sack of Rome convinced Sanmicheli never to return to Lazio.

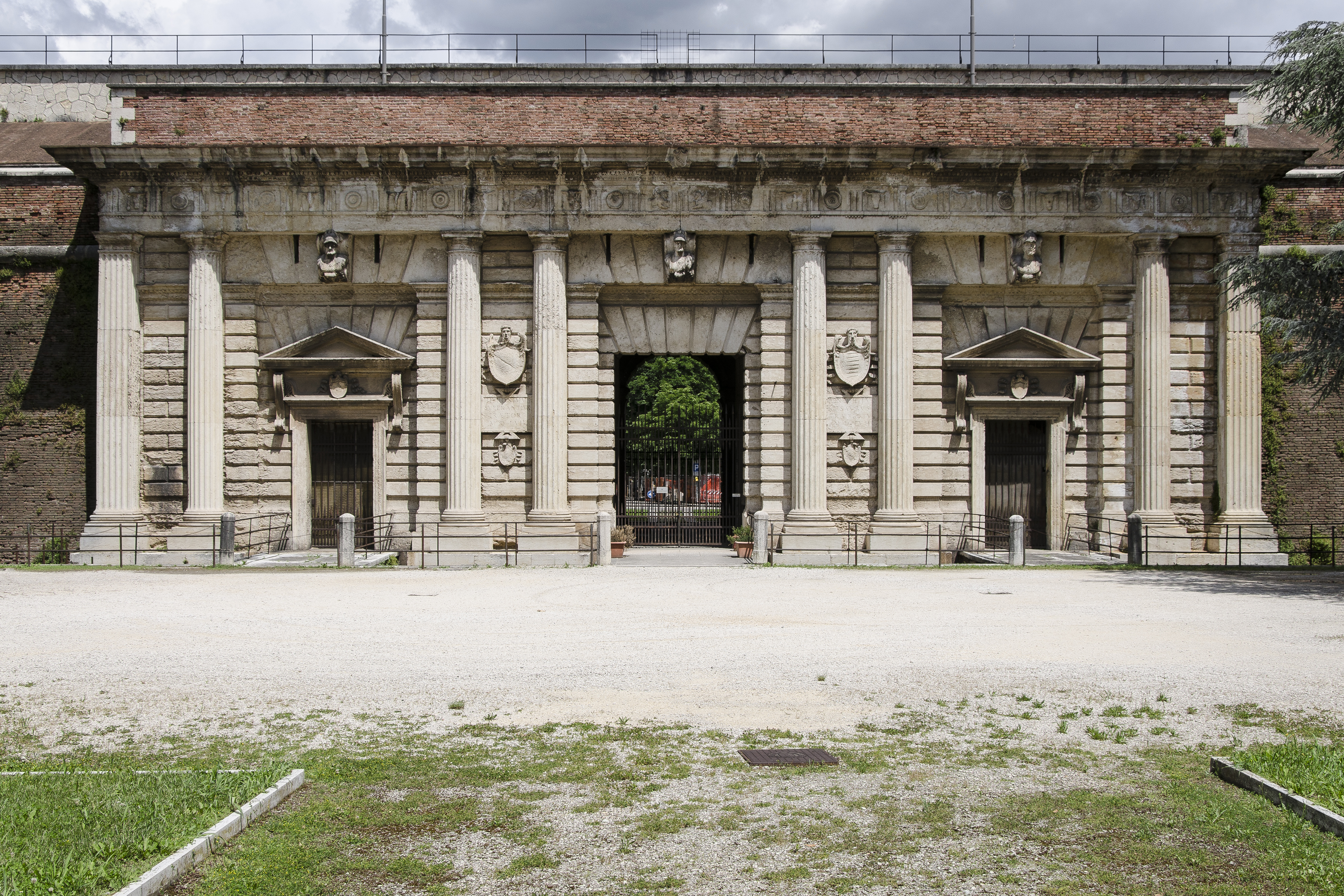
The country side facade of Porta Palio in Verona

His first assignment in this role was in Verona, between 1527 and 1528, where he was called by Giovanni Emo, podestà of the city, to take charge of the restoration of the Ponte Nuovo bridge over the Adige River. In addition, around the end of 1527, the noblewoman Margherita Pellegrini offered him to design a chapel in memory of her son Nicolò at the church of San Bernardino in Verona: to this work the architect applied himself with considerable enthusiasm, producing a work that was much appreciated by the client. The Pellegrini Chapel was then the subject of subsequent retouches by Bartolomeo Giuliari in 1793. On October 28, 1530, when the private work was completed, he was officially appointed superintendent of the military factories of Verona (a position he would hold until his death). With this role he designed the monumental gates of the city: Porta Nuova (Note: On the wall of Porta Nuova the Serenissima granted him the honor of placing his name next to that of Doge Andrea Gritti and the governors of Verona. In Zannandreis (1891, p. 197).) (1532), Porta San Zeno (1541) and Porta Palio (1547); he also began to transform the fortifications of Verona using the bastion system. (Note: He built the Barbarigo (1531), Faler (1535), San Benardino (1535), San Zeno (1542) and, still extant, San Francesco (1546) and Spagna (1547) bastions. In Vecchiato (2010, p. 23).) At the same time (between 1531 and 1532) he was responsible for studying and designing the reorganization of the Visconti Citadel of Verona, in collaboration with his nephew Giangirolamo Sanmicheli, who was his faithful collaborator and successor.

As a result of his work in Verona, Sanmicheli's skills as a military architect became known and appreciated outside the borders of the Republic, and thus it was that Francesco II Sforza, in 1531, obtained permission to have him as a consultant on the strongholds of Vigevano, Pavia, Alessandria, Lodi, and Como for the Lombard duchy. In 1539 Charles V also made a request to the Serenissima, which was, however, rejected, for his services to fortify Antwerp.

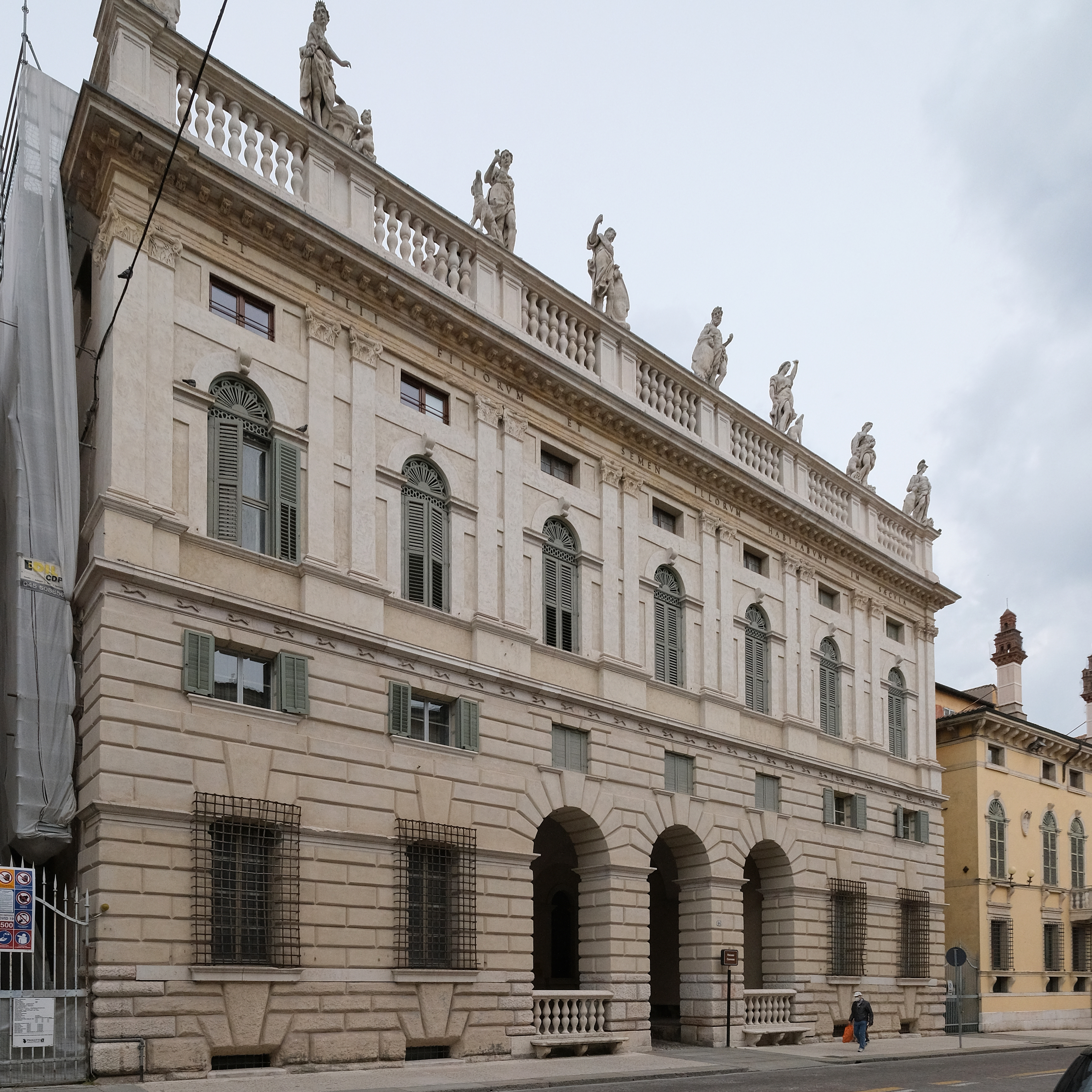
Canossa Palace in Verona

His fame as an architect is linked not only to works of a military character but also to civil architecture in the Renaissance style. In 1530 Ludovico di Canossa, a bishop of Bayeux who had returned to Verona during the 1520s, commissioned him to design a town house near Castelvecchio, between Porta Borsari and the Gavi Arch, (Note: At that time the Arch of the Gavi was placed along today's Corso Cavour at the height of Castelvecchio and in front of Porta Borsari. Following the dismantling carried out by Napoleonic troops, it was rebuilt in 1932 in its present location next to the castle.) and a country villa in Grezzano of Mozzecane. Palazzo Canossa was completed shortly after the bishop's death in 1532; among other things, the architect, precisely through Ludovico, got to know the brothers Giovan Francesco, Antonio and Gregorio Bevilacqua, who entrusted him in the late 1520s with the construction of Palazzo Bevilacqua, which faced the Canossa Palace along what is now Corso Cavour, and the restoration of Bevilacqua Castle in 1532.

In 1531 he began work (which would continue until 1537) on the walls of Orzinuovi, while in the following year he completed studies for the fortifications of Treviso and Brescia, and for the renovation of Piazza Contarena in Udine. The following year he was in Padua for extensive studies leading to the construction of the Cornaro bastion.

In 1533 he was very active in Verona, where he built the portals of the palaces of the Capitanio and Podestà at the behest of the Venetian rectors Dolfin and Giustinian, and renovated his family home; he also went to Pesaro and Senigallia for consultations related to ports.

=== Fortification of Venice and the eastern borders ===
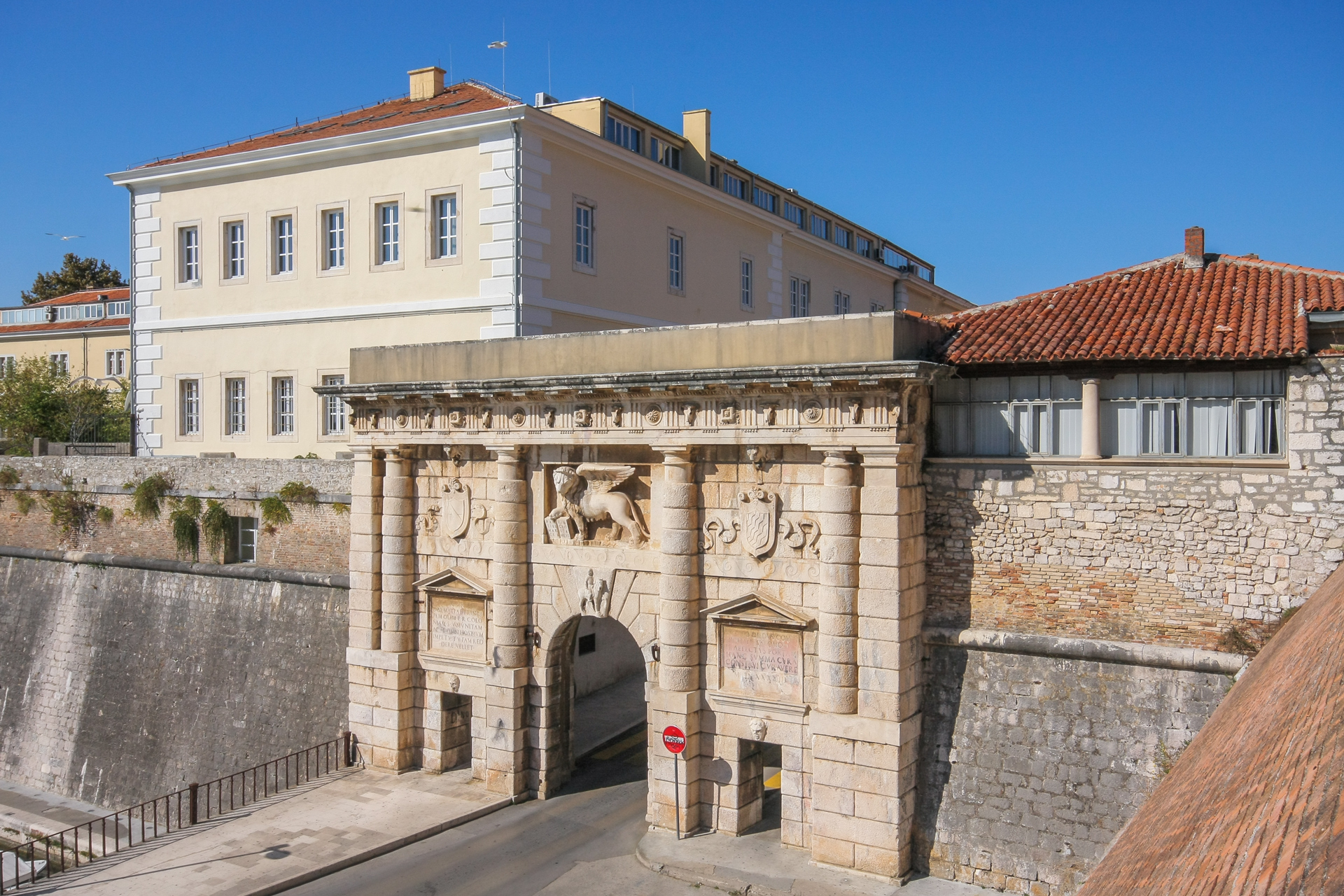
Mainland Gate in Zadar

In October 1534 Sanmicheli left for Zadar at the request of the Senate of the Republic, though not before dictating his will to the Venetian notary Giovanni Cavani. Upon his return to Venice, the Council of Ten commissioned him to draw up a secret report on the defenses of the lagoon, a document that demonstrates the excellent methodology used by Sanmicheli, which is still relevant today; with this document, the architect was able to highlight the complex problems of the territory and formalize a redesign with a view to not only military but also civilian efficiency. This assignment was immediately followed, on January 27, by the commission to design the fort of Sant'Andrea, on the island of the same name in front of the Venice Lido, and other lagoon fortifications. This work earned him an appointment on April 14 as chief engineer of the Republic, "both for the excavation and maintenance of our lagoons, as well as for the fortification of our sites [...] from land and sea."

His intense activity as a military architect did not prevent him, however, from also dealing with civil works: in these years he designed for the Cornaro family a villa in Piombino Dese (not to be confused with Villa Cornaro, built by Palladio), later demolished in 1795.

Between 1537 and 1540 Sanmicheli experienced a period of intense work, during which he traveled almost continuously to inspect eastern fortifications together with his nephew, with whom personal and professional ties increased; he visited Dalmatia, Zadar, Šibenik, Corfu, Crete, and other places in the Stato da Màr. On his return from the long journey he continued to work on the fortifications of the mainland (particularly Orzinuovi and Chioggia), but he also visited Vicenza for advice on the building of the Palazzo della Ragione, an occasion during which he most likely met the architect Andrea Palladio.

=== The last years ===
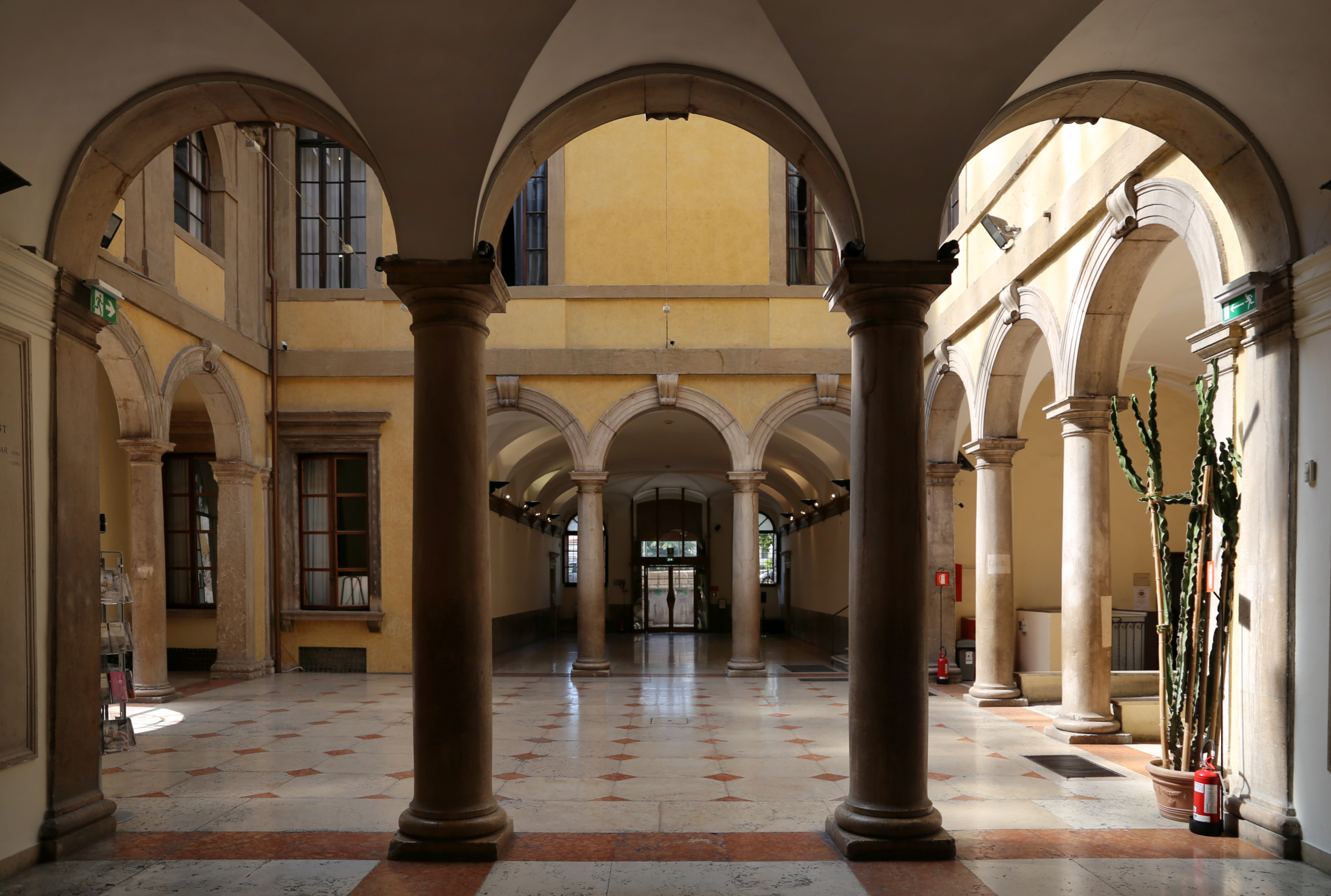
The courtyard of Palazzo Pompei, commissioned to the Veronese architect by the Lavezzola family.

In the following years, the Veronese architect still traveled extensively in the vast Domini di Terraferma to carry out surveys and inspections about the various defensive structures, although he had to renounce a new mission to the eastern territories due to precarious physical conditions. He was also very much involved in inspections of hydraulic networks, and he continued to supervise and open numerous construction sites in Verona and Venice.

Having moved permanently to Verona, he devoted himself to the designs of numerous sumptuous patrician residences in the city, as well as the construction of the dome of the church of San Giorgio in Braida and the (unfinished) facade of Santa Maria in Organo. In 1540 he finished work on the Palazzo Pompei, commissioned by the wealthy Lavezzola family, one of the Veronese master's most successful works. (Note: Giovambattista Da Persico had this to say about it: "The palace that once belonged to the Lavezzola family, now to Pompei, one of Sanmicheli's most praised designs, stands on this bank. Whether more ornamentation comes to it from the site, or vice versa, would not be affirmed so lightly. Its facade is varied and vague in the dignity and simplicity of only two floors, the first of which is rustic, the second of which is of Doric order." In Da Persico (1820, p. 18).)

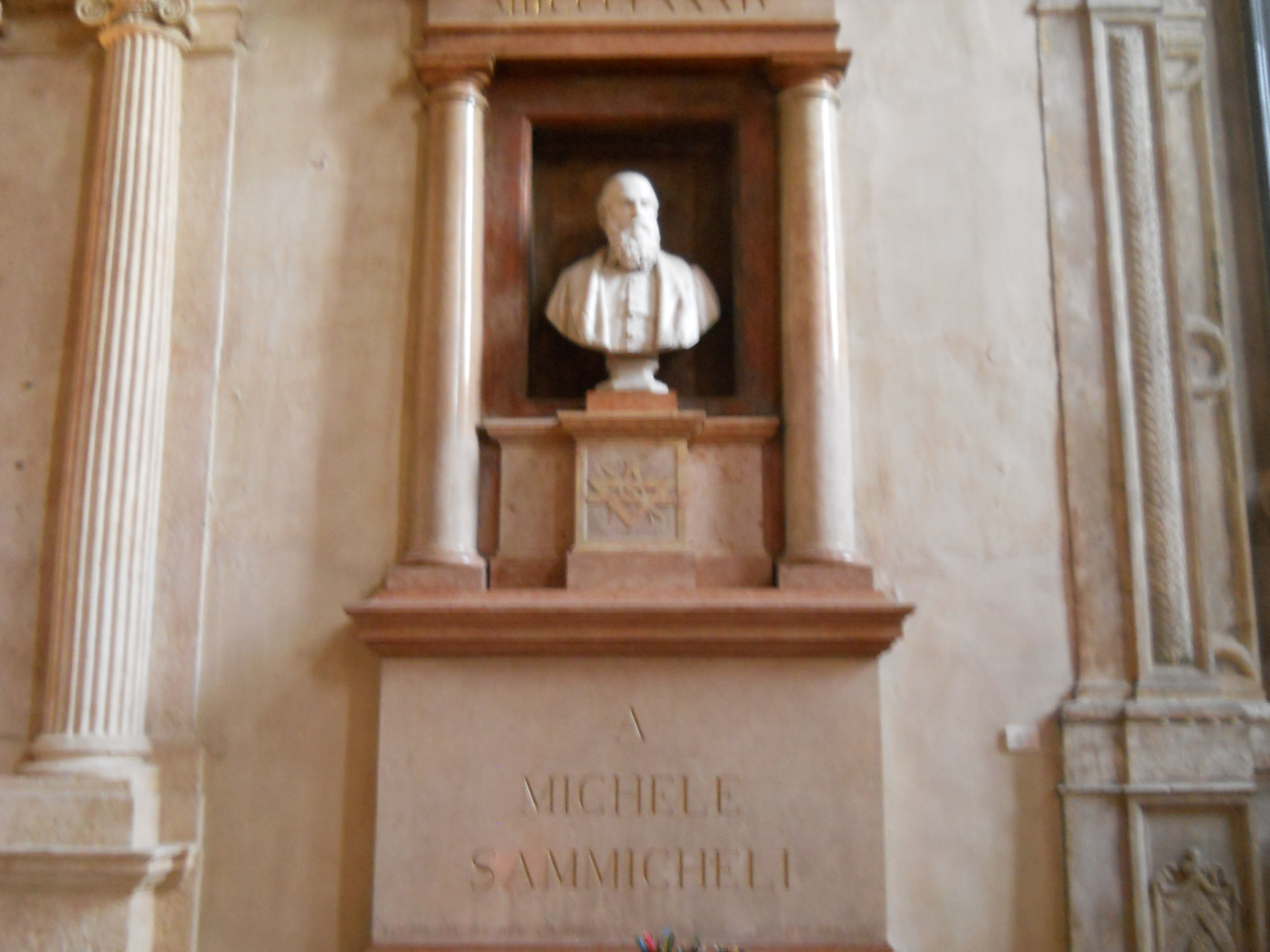
Sanmicheli's funeral monument at the church of San Tomaso Cantuariense

In 1541 he designed the Corner Mocenigo Palace in Venice, overlooking Campo San Polo in the sestiere of the same name, the same innovative elements of which can be found in his later works: Palazzo Roncale in Rovigo, Palazzo degli Honorij in Verona (1553–54) and Palazzo Grimani di San Luca in Venice (from about 1556), which is also his last masterpiece.

In 1555 he produced drawings for the rebuilding of the Bucentaur depot at the Venetian Arsenal, while the following year he worked on a triumphal arch for the entrance of Bona Sforza in Padua.

Hard hit by the loss of his beloved nephew Giangirolamo, in whom he saw his worthy successor, he ended his career with the design of the centrally planned church of Madonna di Campagna, finished by Bernardino Brugnoli in Verona. On April 29, 1559, he dictated a will naming his cousin Paolo as his universal heir, (Note: In a concurrently dictated deed he named him as his heir.) and towards the end of August of the same year he died in his hometown due to a violent fever. (Note: Vasari reports that "he was killed by a malignant fever." In Vasari (1568, ch. Vita di Michele San Michele architettore veronese).) His remains are kept in the church of San Tomaso Cantuariense.

== Influences and styles ==
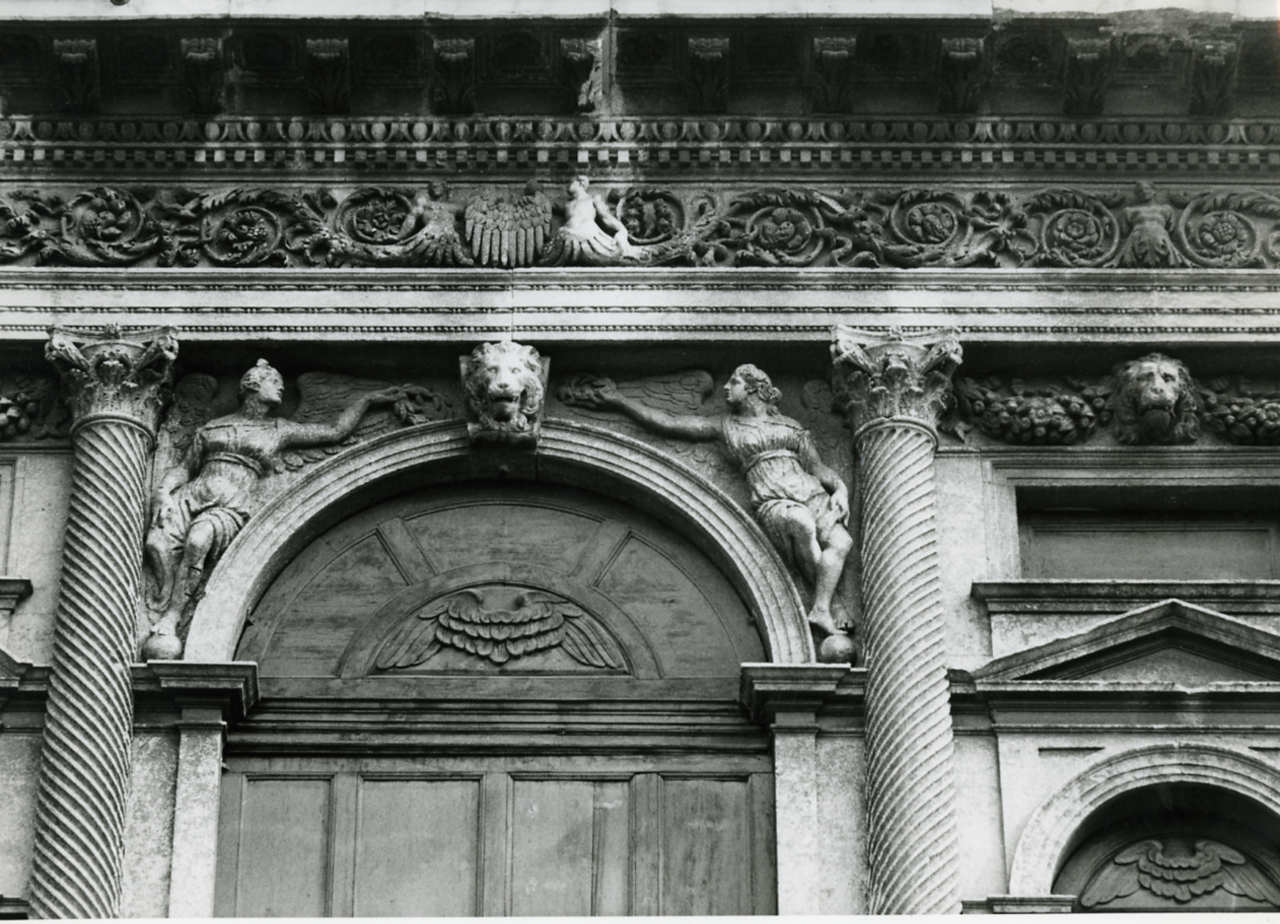
Detail photograph of Bevilacqua Palace, where the refinement of decoration typical of the Veronese architect's early works can be seen

Sanmicheli has repeatedly been called an architect with a Mannerist style. This, however, is an inadequate definition, since whereas in the architectural achievements of Michelangelo or Giulio Romano one finds the deliberate transgressions typical of this style, in Sanmicheli the deliberate violation of classical rules appears to be absent: if anything, his transgressions were not aimed at the desire to amaze the observer, but were necessary in order to be able to mix ancient elements with the requirements of modern designs.

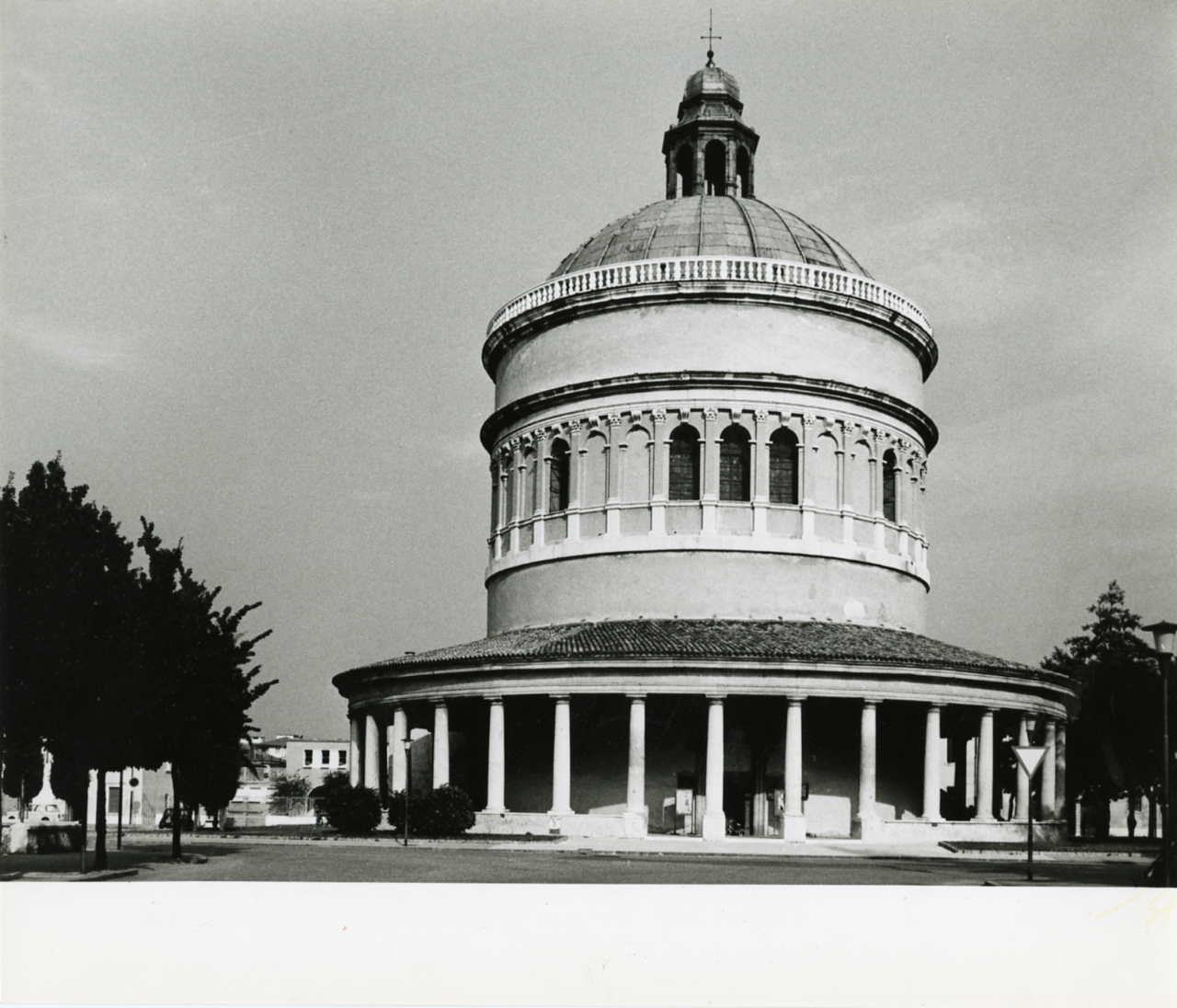
The Church of Our Lady of the Countryside, where a decidedly more sober and monumental style can be seen than the one adopted in the early works

Sanmicheli's style, which certainly appears recognizable and unmistakable, manifests itself as the result of High Renaissance influences (particularly Bramante and Raphael) learned during his stay in central Italy and the predilections of architects already working in Verona and Venice. The Veronese architect learned the canonical rules of architecture from the work of Vitruvius, so much so that Arentino named him in a small group of architects referred to as "Vitruvii in li edifici belli." In some works, however, Sanmicheli did not just slavishly apply the prescriptions of Vitruvian architecture, rather applying them in new ways. Despite the fact that he left no graphic documentation, he had a perfect knowledge of ancient architecture, particularly Veronese architecture, since numerous inspirations are drawn from the Arena, the Gavi Arch, the destroyed Jupiter Ammon Arch, the Roman theater, and the Borsari and Leoni gates.

While throughout his life Sanmicheli appears rather consistent with one idea of architecture, one can still find in his works a change in style. In his early period he turned out to be more inclined to realize projects endowed with greater complexity and finer workmanship (such as Bevilacqua Palace and Pellegrini Chapel), while at the end of his life he favored a more sober yet more monumental style (as in the church of Madonna di Campagna, the architect's last work).

== Sanmicheli, patron of artists ==
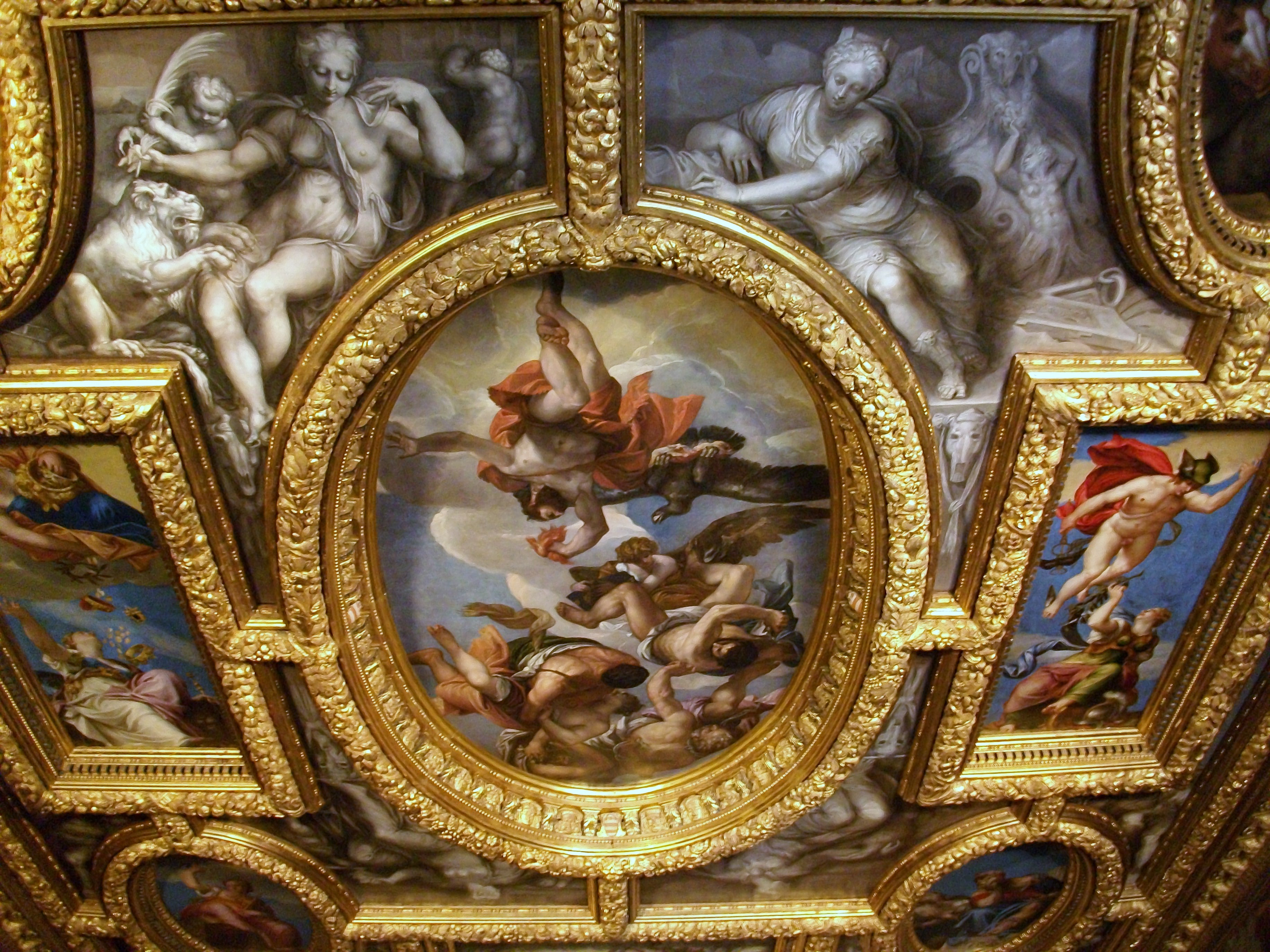
The ceiling decorated by Paolo Veronese in the Hall of the Council of Ten at the Doge's Palace in Venice, a commission also obtained with the support of Sanmicheli

At the height of his career Sanmicheli belonged to the elite of the Venetian artistic scene, on a par with Titian and Sansovino; this condition allowed him to be in contact with a large part of the local nobility, and in addition his activity as an architect put him in a position to advise the client about the decorations of the work under construction. In the face of all this, he had the opportunity to recommend many painters and sculptors to his liking, becoming a kind of patron.

Among the painters who most benefited from the relationship with Sanmicheli were Francesco Torbido, Battista del Moro, Giovanni Battista Zelotti, and Paolo Veronese, (Note: According to Vasari, Sanmicheli "loved as sons" Veronese and Zelotti, and this friendship enabled him to get the right recommendations for some important works, such as the paintings at Villa Soranza and the decorations of the Hall of the Council of Ten at the Doge's Palace. In Vasari (1568, ch. Vita di Michele San Michele architettore veronese).) the latter one of the most important exponents of Venetian painting at that time, although Vasari was also recommended for some works, in particular for the creation of nine panels for one of the ceilings of the Corner Spinelli Palace. (Note: To thank him, Vasari gave him a drawing: San Michele driving out demons.) Although many of the sculptural works needed for his projects were done by Sanmicheli himself, he commissioned some from other sculptors, especially Alessandro Vittoria, Pietro da Salò, and Danese Cattaneo.

As a result of these considerations, Sanmicheli's influence on Venetian art cannot be relegated to architecture alone, but extended to the practice of painting and sculpture as well.

== Artistic legacy ==
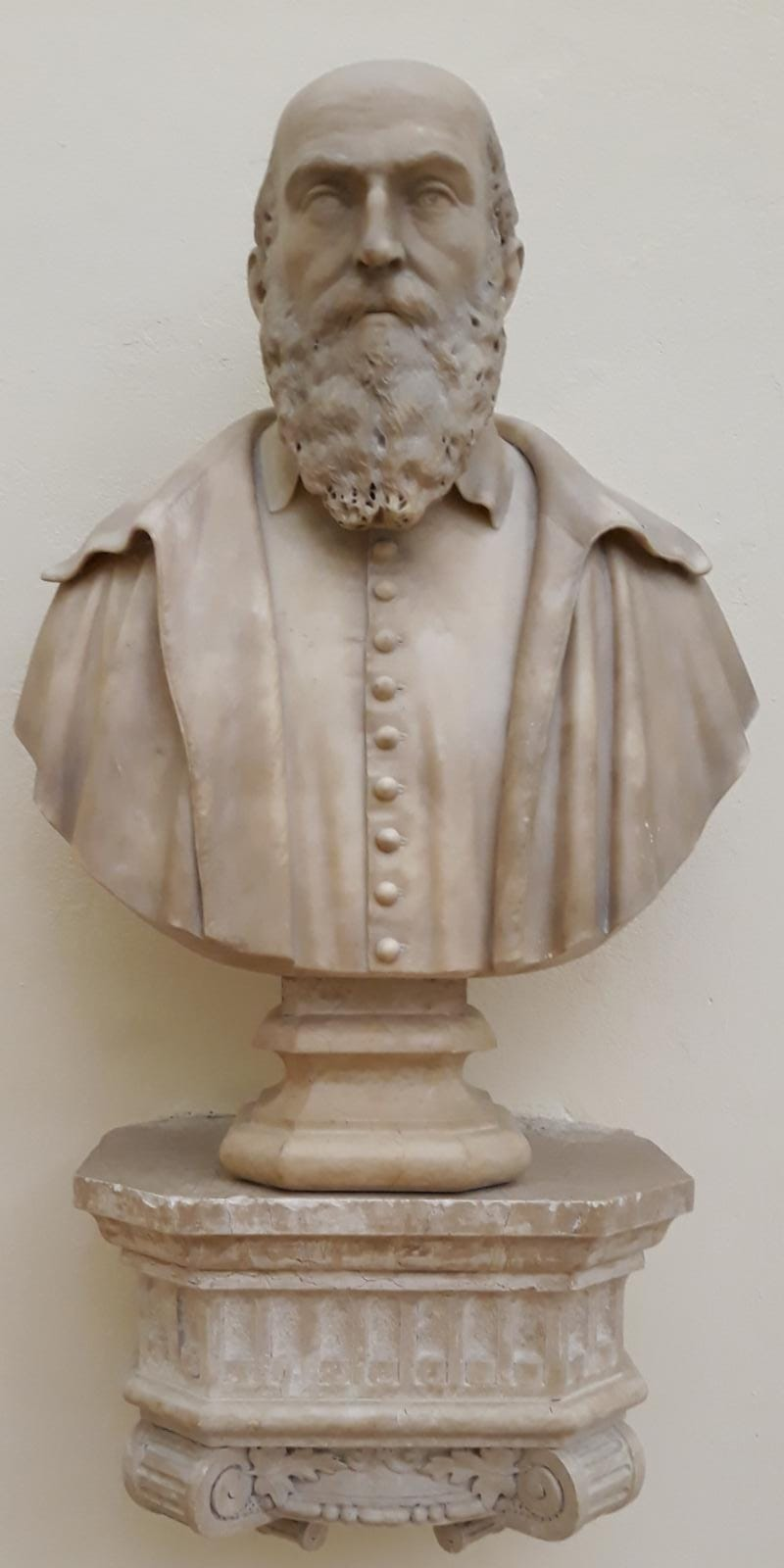
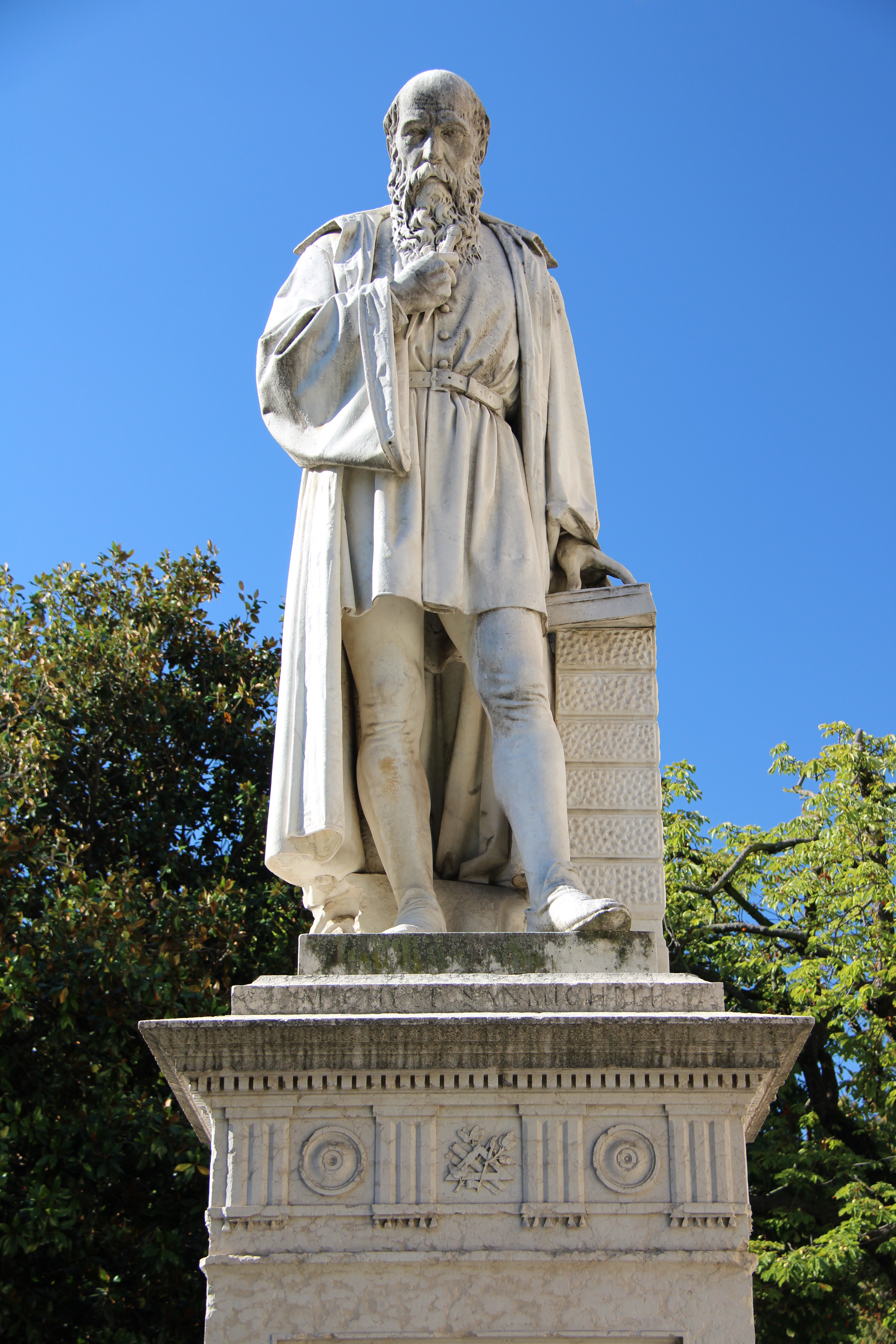
The bust of Michele Sanmicheli at the protomoteca of the Verona Civic Library and the statue, by Gianbattista Troiani, located along Corso Porta Nuova

Towards the end of the 16th century, Sanmicheli's art strongly influenced the work of contemporary architects, although after his death, as time passed, his influence diminished until it disappeared altogether. One of the architects who more than any other drew inspiration from the work of the Veronese master was certainly Jacopo Sansovino, as can be seen from some of his works, such as the Marciana Library (Note: Some details are reminiscent of Porta Nuova and Pompeii Palace.) and the Corner Palace. (Note: Very similar to Canossa Palace both in plan and elevation.) In turn, Sanmicheli also took inspiration from Sansovino's work; this suggests that there were good relations between the two rivals, and that they sometimes shared some ideas.

Another architect who was strongly influenced by the Veronese's work was Andrea Palladio, so much so that he may have initially considered him as his mentor, though his influence on the Paduan architect waned as he matured, eventually fading away almost completely. Other architects inspired by Sanmicheli were Bartolomeo Ammannati (Note: He used the design of Porta Palio as his main compositional model.) and Michelangelo, who, as Vasari recalls, had sympathy and respect for his Veronese colleague. Sanmicheli's closest followers, however, were members of his family: the young Bernardino Brugnoli and his nephews Giangirolamo Sanmicheli and Domenico Curtoni were among those who more than anyone else embraced the artistic legacy of their famous relative. Through them, the Sanmichelian style lived on until the mid-17th century, when the growing popularity of Palladio's approach to architecture overshadowed it.

It would be necessary to wait well beyond the beginning of the 18th century with Bartolomeo dal Pozzo through his work Le vite de' pittori, de gli scultori et architetti veronesi, and especially with Scipione Maffei and his Verona illustrata, for interest in Sanmicheli's work to be rediscovered. This renewed interest is also found later in the studies and works of Alessandro Pompei, (Note: One can find in the Customs House of San Fermo an example of the influence of the Sanmichelian style in Pompei.) as well as in Adriano Cristofali and Luigi Trezza. In the nineteenth century, there were additional Veronese architects and scholars who dealt with his work, such as Michelangelo Castellazzi, who designed Palazzo Ottolini (in Piazza Bra) modeling it on the structure of Palazzo Canossa, and Bartolomeo Giuliari, who in 1816 produced a monograph on Pellegrini Chapel. In 1823, Francesco Ronzani and Girolamo Luciolli finally produced a meticulous collection of Sanmicheli's works.

In appreciation of Sanmicheli's works, the city of Verona dedicated a statue by Gianbattista Troiani to him. The sculpture still stands in the Corso Porta Nuova.

== Major works ==
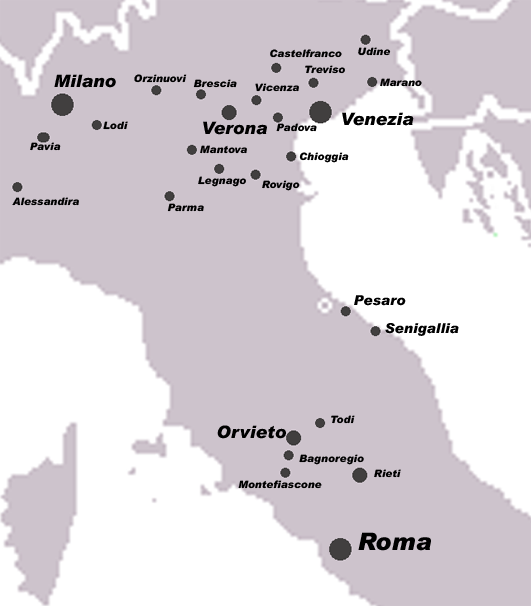
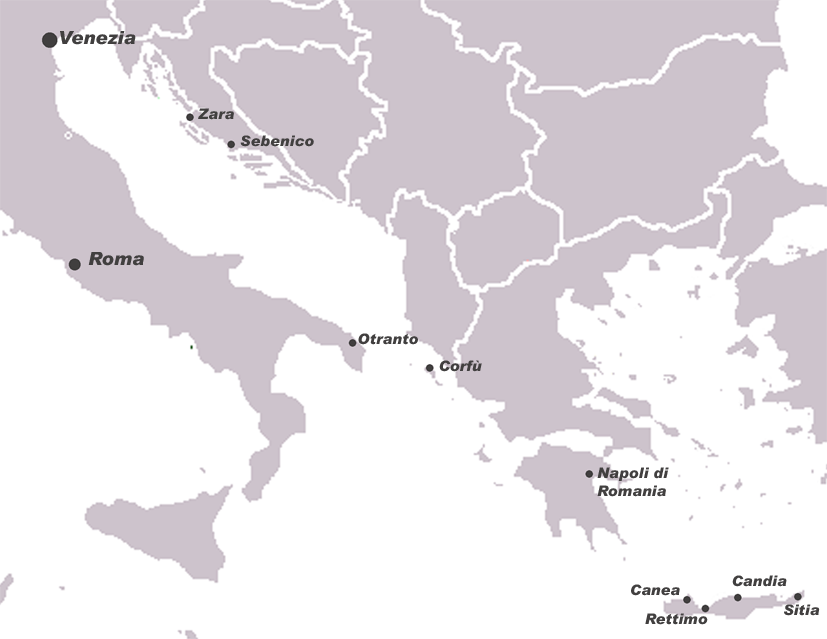
Maps of places in north-central Italy and the eastern Mediterranean where Sanmicheli worked

At the height of his career Sanmicheli enjoyed wide recognition among the Venetian ruling class and held a prominent position over other architects in the service of the Serenissima. His position as "Architect to the Most Illustrious Venetian Ducal Empire" led him to superintend numerous projects in the vast territories of the Serenissima, both in the Domini di Terraferma, i.e., northeastern Italy, and in the distant possessions of Corfu, Crete, and Croatia.

At the beginning of the 16th century, the Venetian government was very concerned about the defense of its borders, fears that had been heightened following the War of the League of Cambrai, which took place between 1509 and 1516. To safeguard the Republic it was decided to undertake a project to improve defensive structures, so the Venetians found in Sanmicheli the right man to accomplish this delicate task. For him, in 1535, they created ad hoc the post of engineer superintendent of all fortifications in the empire.

Although his fame was mainly related to military works, the Veronese architect also did his best in the construction of civil works, such as ecclesiastical and residential buildings of great value, so much so that he aroused the appreciation of other contemporary architects as well, such as Sebastiano Serlio (Note: He praised his ability to construct "buildings both for the comfort and adornment of peace, as well as for the defense of war." In Serlio (1537, p. III).) and Jacopo Sansovino.

Although in the early part of his career he was engaged in the cities of central Italy, the place to which he linked his name more than any other was undoubtedly Verona. In addition to his hometown, where he was a main actor on the architectural scene, he was often called upon for consultations or projects outside the territories of the Serenissima.

=== Military works ===
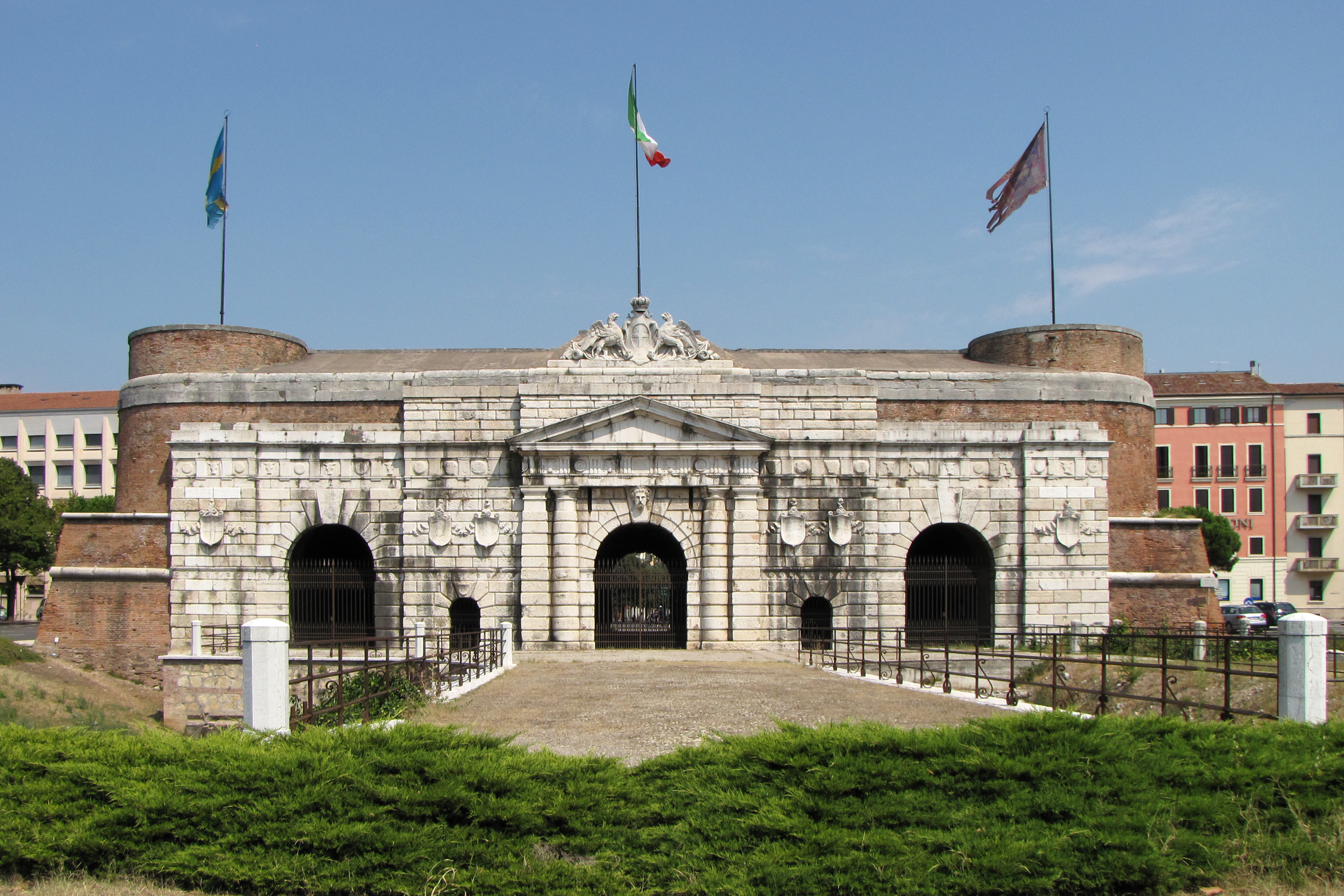
Porta Nuova in Verona

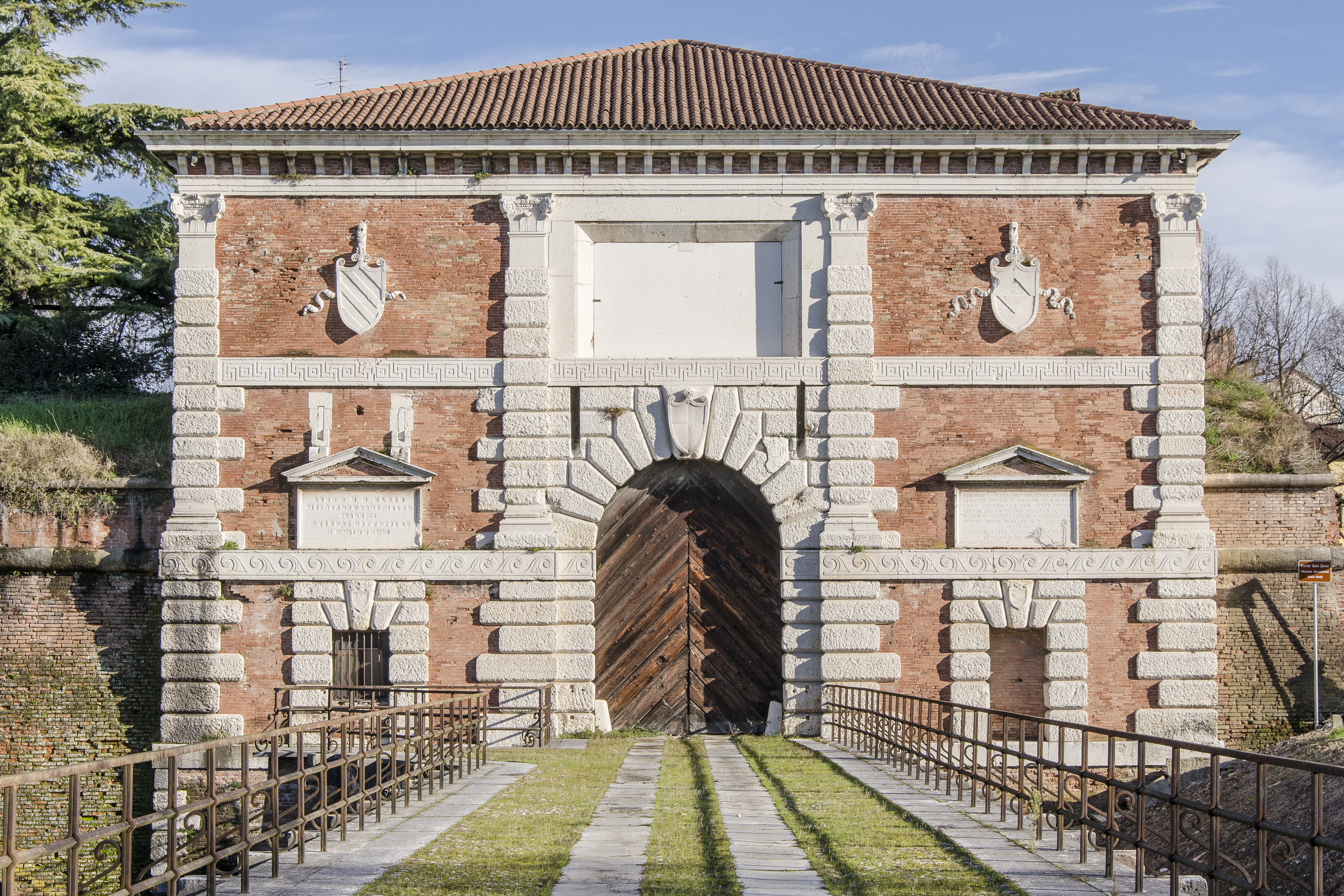
Porta San Zeno in Verona

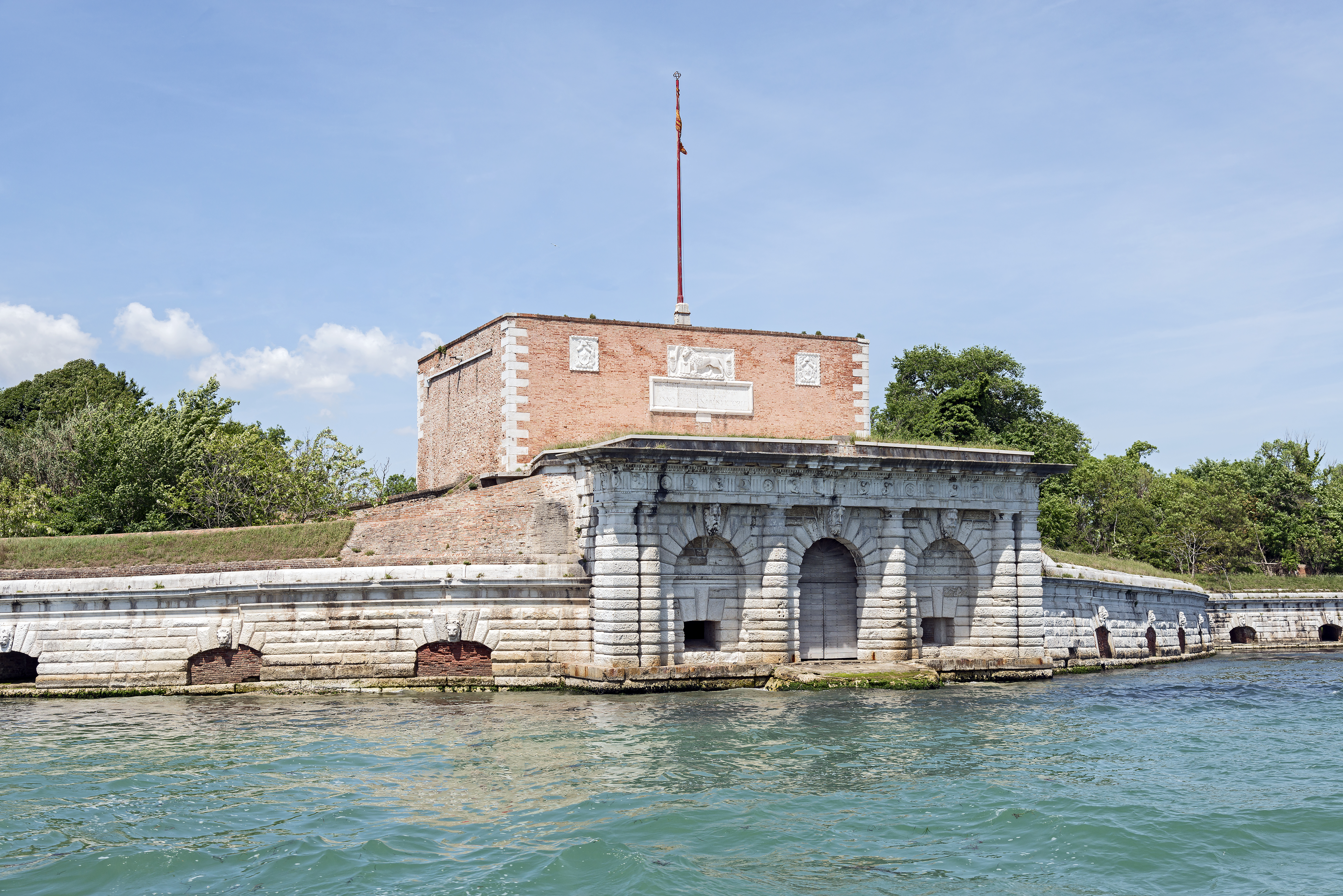
Fort of Sant'Andrea in Venice

Vasari, who knew him in Venice, attributes to Sanmicheli fundamental innovations in the field of fortifications at a time of general renewal in the field of military works for which the term "trace italienne" is used. However, at least for the first of these innovations, the invention of the angled bastion, it should be remembered that modern historiography attributes it to Giuliano da Sangallo and Antonio da Sangallo. Sanmicheli completed his training in contact with the work of the two brothers and their heir Antonio da Sangallo the Younger, with whom he collaborated at length.

==== In Verona ====
- Porta Nuova. Built between 1535 and 1540, it was extensively remodeled by the Austrians in 1854 with the addition of two side arches on both facades. On the rear façade was a plaque, later lost, attributing the architect's authorship of the work.
- Porta San Zeno. Probably built between 1540 and 1541 and certainly finished in 1542 (date given in an inscription located on the city-side facade), it has several original elements compared to the other two city gates, starting with the facade made not entirely of stone, but with alternating bricks, and a greater simplicity and sobriety. This is probably due to the need to build it in a short time and at a relatively modest expense.
- Porta Palio. Built between 1542 and 1557, it is considered to be Sanmicheli's masterpiece in terms of what he did as a military architect, fitting perfectly into the late Renaissance culture of the period. While the country-side facade has elements that make it a sumptuous and refined work, intended to express the prestige of the city and the Republic, the city side is very austere, covered in rusticated ashlar.

==== In Venice ====
- Fort of Sant'Andrea. Built beginning in 1534.

==== In other places ====
- "Lower" gate in Legnago. Begun in 1529, it stood on the opposite side of the city from the San Martino gate, facing in the direction of the Polesine. Now demolished, there are no records of its appearance.
- "Upper" San Martino Gate in Legnago. Designed around 1529-30 and finished in 1535. Opposite the "lower" gate, it too was demolished in 1887; its structure is known from 18th-century reliefs.
- Mainland Gate in Zadar. Built in 1537.

==== Fortifications ====
Sanmicheli was called to many places to design or provide consultation about fortifications to defend cities:

- at Monteleone d'Orvieto (1525);
- at Piacenza (1526);
- at Legnago (1529);
- at Verona (1530–37);
- at Padua (1532);
- at Senigallia (1533, with later reworkings);
- at Zadar (1534);
- in Venice (1535);
- at Orzinuovi (c. 1535);
- at Brescia (1536);
- at Corfu (1537);
- in Crete (in various locations, between 1538 and 1539);
- in Peschiera del Garda (1548).

=== Palaces and civil architecture ===
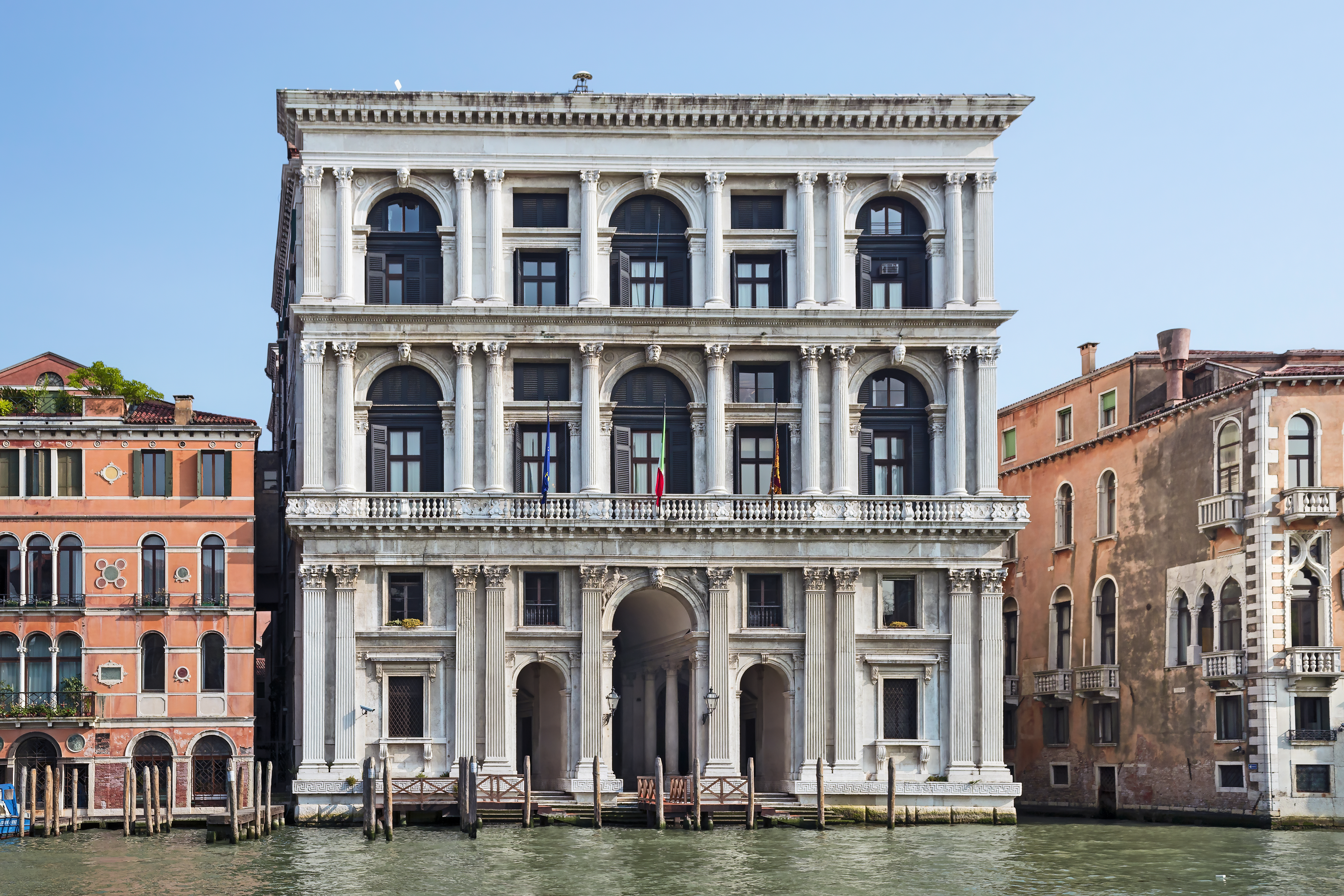
Palazzo Grimani di San Luca in Venice

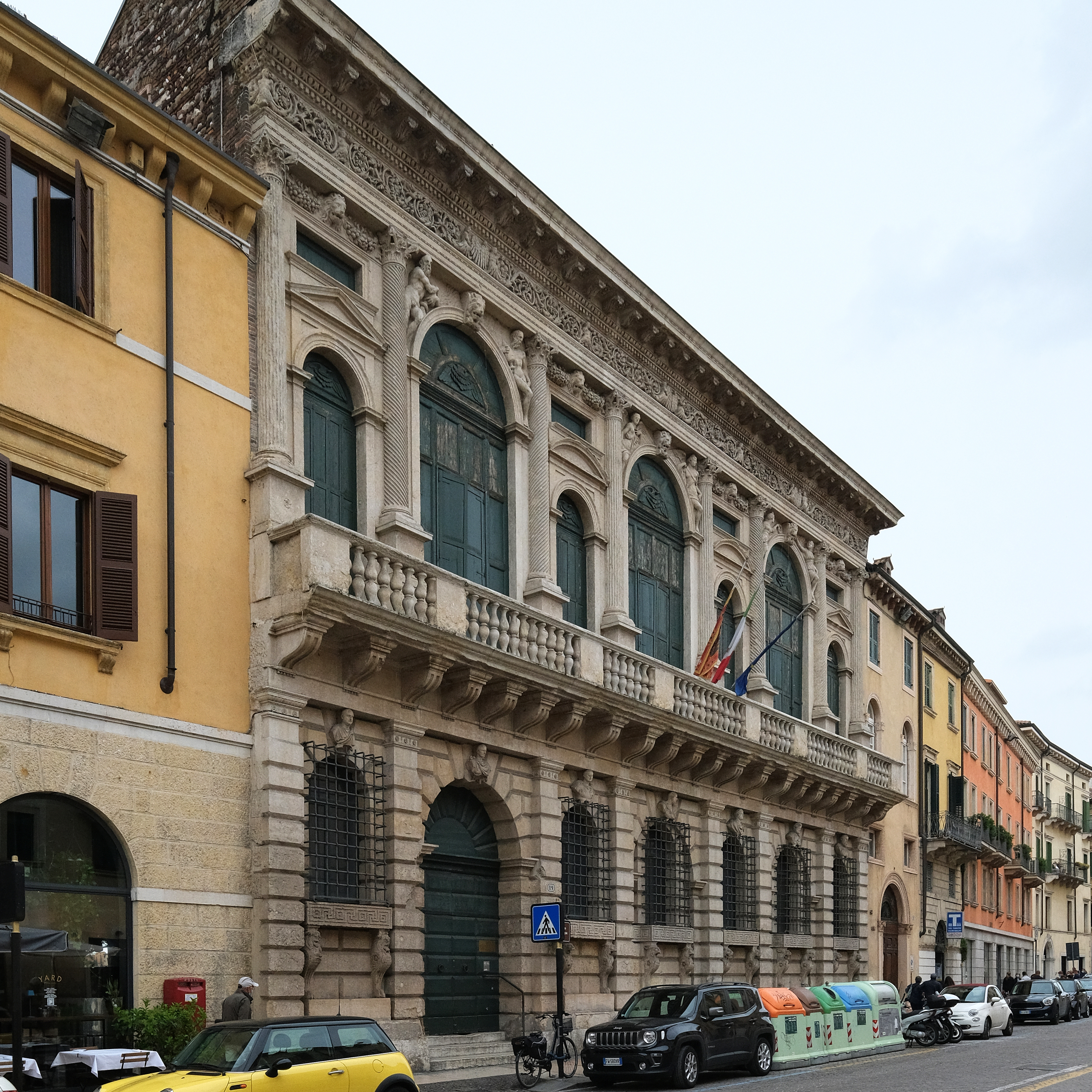
Bevilacqua Palace in Verona

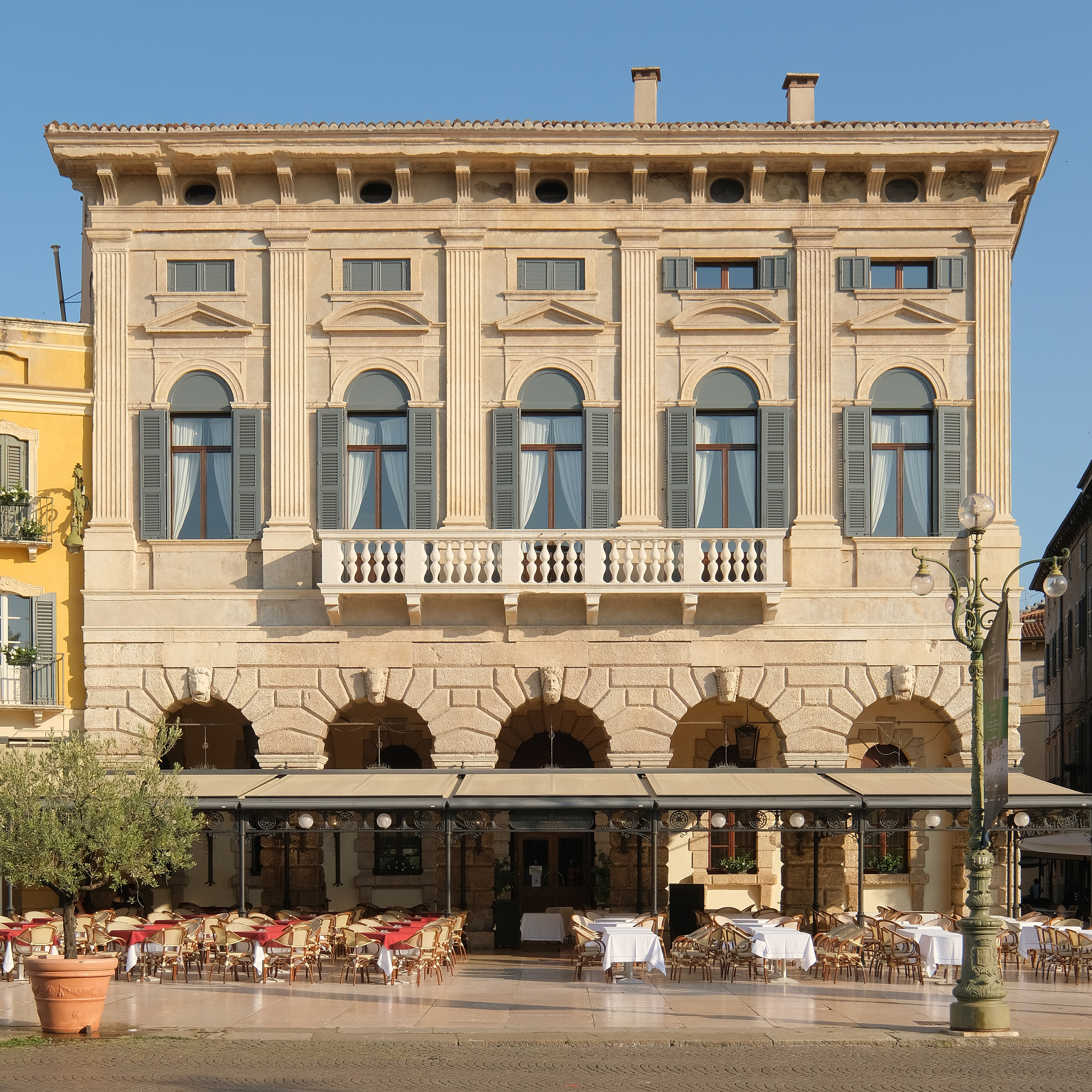
Palazzo degli Honorij in Verona

In designing palaces, Sanmicheli was one of the most innovative architects of the 16th century: a feature of his works is the mixing of classical elements, frequent in the works of Bramante and Raphael, with other elements belonging to the local architectural tradition. While it was in Orvieto that Sanmicheli began his career as a palace builder (due to his friendship with Girolamo Petrucci), it was in Verona, however, that he had the opportunity to demonstrate his true abilities.

==== In Orvieto ====
- Palazzo Petrucci on Corso Cavour. Commissioned by Girolamo Petrucci in 1517, the work involved a complete renovation of the interior and a new facade on three levels.
- Municipal Palace. The renovations included the construction of a new vault for the lower hall, the reconstruction of four workshops and other minor interventions.

==== In Venice ====
- Palazzo Corner Mocenigo in Campo San Polo. Built in 1541.
- Palazzo Grimani on the Grand Canal. Realized in 1556.

==== In Verona ====
- Ponte Nuovo. The bridge was built between 1526 and 1528 to replace an earlier bridge destroyed during the flood of 1512. Of simple structure with four arches of increasing span and separated by piers, it was also destroyed during the Verona flood of 1882.
- Palazzo Canossa on Corso Cavour. Commissioned by Ludovico di Canossa, it was designed between 1526–28 and work began in 1531. Built almost simultaneously with Bevilacqua Palace, the two immediately acquired great urbanistic significance.
- Bevilacqua Palace on Corso Cavour. In view of the strong rivalry between the Bevilacqua and Canossa families, in 1532 the former decided to commission a sumptuous palace from the master, immediately after construction of Canossa Palace began. Palazzo Bevilacqua is among Sanmicheli's most elegant and refined works.
- Bevilacqua Castle. A medieval fortress ruined in 1404 during the wars between the Venetians and the Carraresi, it was transformed by Sanmicheli in the 1930s: having repaired the four outer walls and the four towers, the interior was completely renovated and organized around a rectangular courtyard. The master is also credited with the roof garden and the renovation of the large courtyard behind, including the monumental Doric order portal.
- Portal of the Palazzo del Capitanio in Piazza dei Signori. Commissioned by Captain Leonardo Giustinian and built presumably between 1531 and 1533, the white stone portal echoes the theme of the triumphal arch and is characterized by the use of the Corinthian order and the presence of noble coats of arms.
- Portal of the Palazzo del Podestà in Piazza dei Signori. Commissioned in 1533 by podestà Giovanni Dolfin, it was built to replace an earlier entrance with a simple fornix. The design of the portal is set on the model of the triumphal arch and is distinguished by Ionic columns and pilasters and the presence of the lion of St. Mark at the top of the pediment.
- Palazzo Pompei on the Lungadige Porta Vittoria. Commissioned by the Lavezola family around the mid-1530s, it is characterized not only by its monumental façade with the ground floor in rusticated ashlar and the more elegant piano nobile in Doric order, but also by the presence of a courtyard in an eccentric position with respect to the central axis, a pattern that often recurs in the Venetian building tradition. It currently houses the civic museum of natural history.
- Portal of Sanmicheli house, first in Binastrova Street and then in Vicolo Pozza. The building, renovated between 1540 and 1541, had three floors, adorned with a fine portal and with windows fitted with rectangular frames and arranged asymmetrically. The house was demolished in 1890 due to extensive damage during the 1882 flooding of the Adige River, and the portal moved to another building in Vicolo Pozza.
- Villa Brenzone Guarienti at Punta San Vigilio. Characterized by a sober and austere design, not very typical of Sanmichelian architecture, it is included by some authors among the master's works, probably built between 1541 for Agostino Brenzone; already habitable the following year, the work was probably completed between 1550 and 1553.
- Palazzo degli Honorij in Piazza Bra. Built beginning in 1556 on a commission from Bonaventura degli Honorij, it was probably completed by a Sanmichelian workshop after the master's death.

==== Other ====
- Corte Spinosa, in the environs of Mantua. Designed in about 1527, it is attributed to Sanmicheli because of the rear wall of the loggia, very similar to other works by the architect.
- Villa La Soranza in Castelfranco Veneto. Designed in 1540 on a commission from the Venetian patrician Alvise Soranzo, it was destroyed in 1818. It was decorated with frescoes by Paolo Veronese and Giovan Battista Zelotti.
- Palazzo Roncale in Rovigo. Completed in 1555, many features of this work can be found in other buildings by the master, which could prove his authorship.

=== Religious works ===
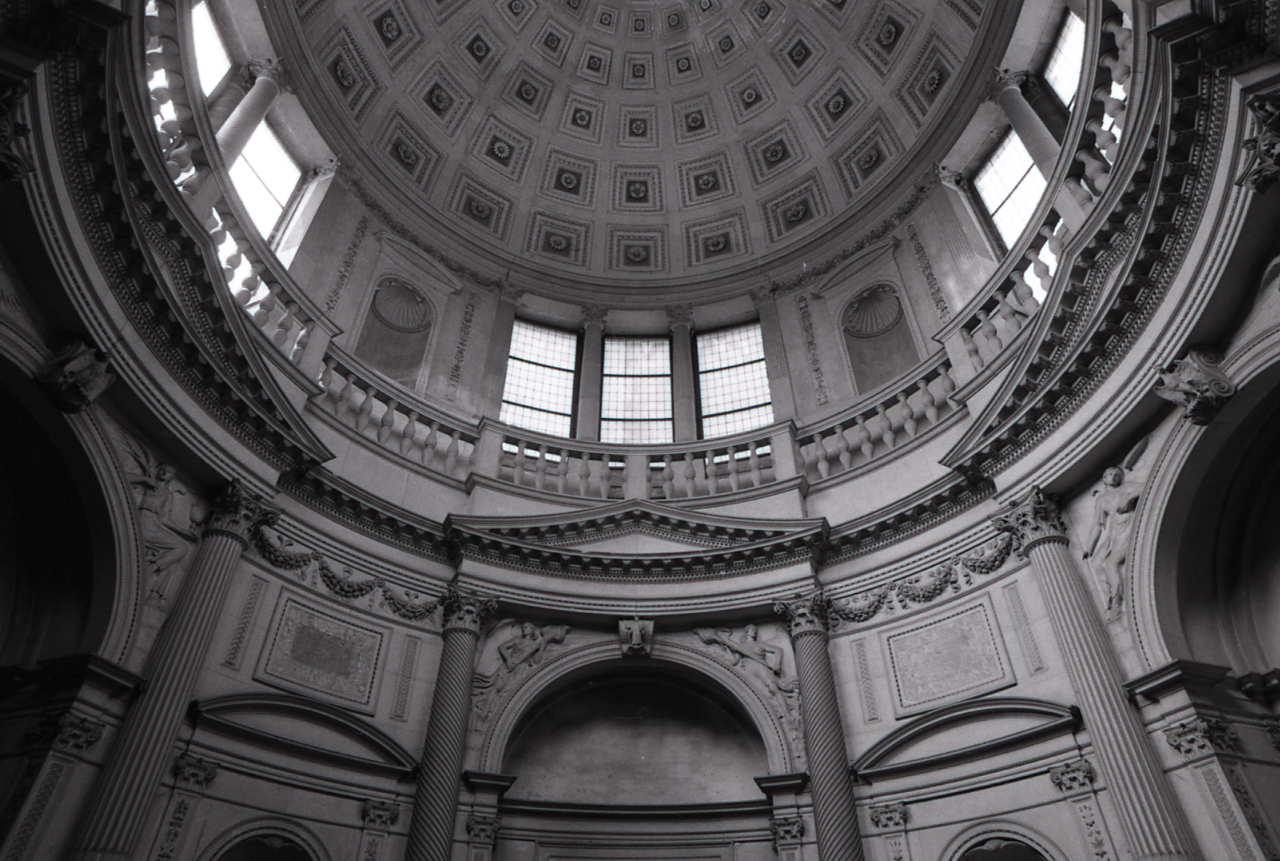
Detail of the Pellegrini Chapel in Verona in a photograph by Paolo Monti

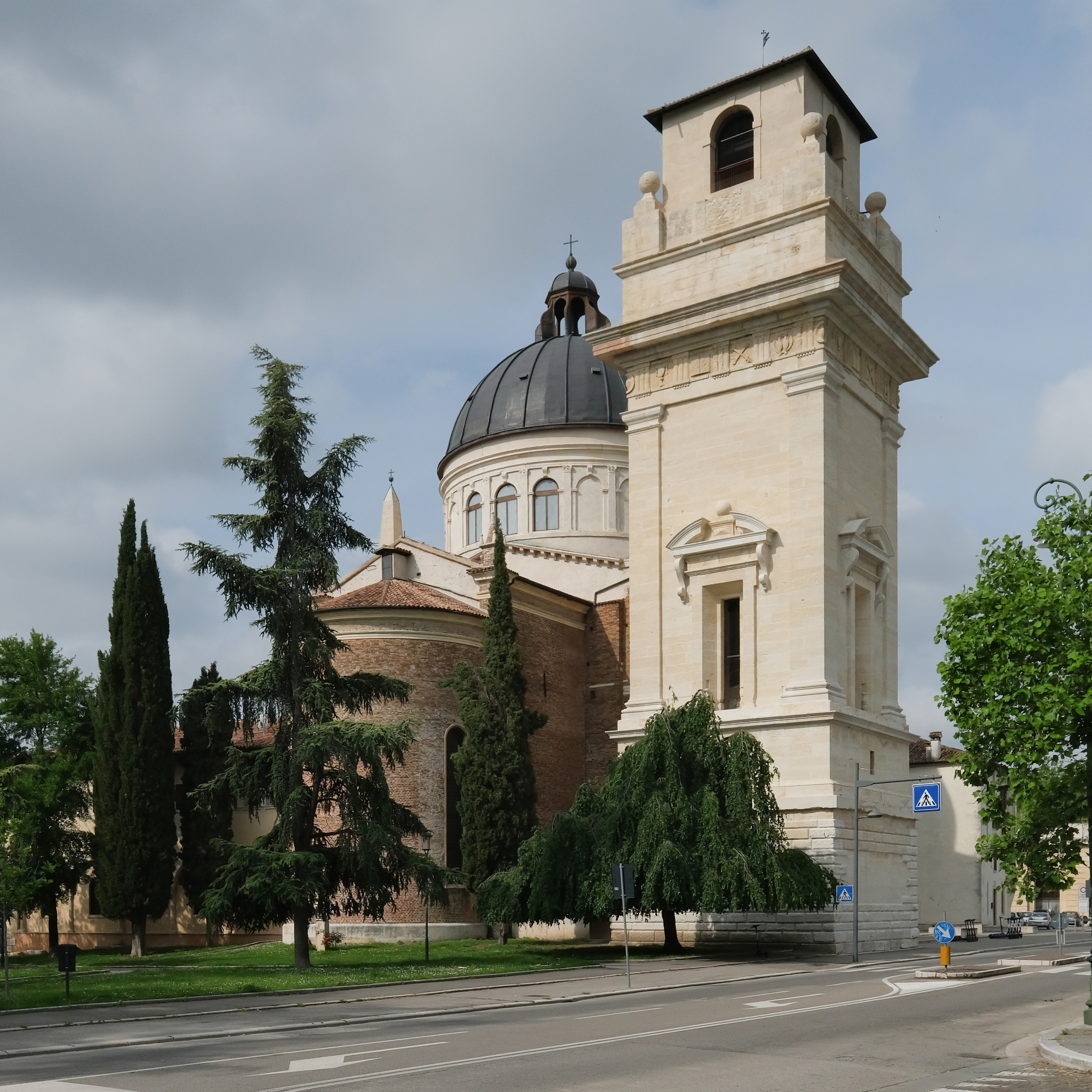
The (unfinished) dome and bell tower of San Giorgio in Braida in Verona

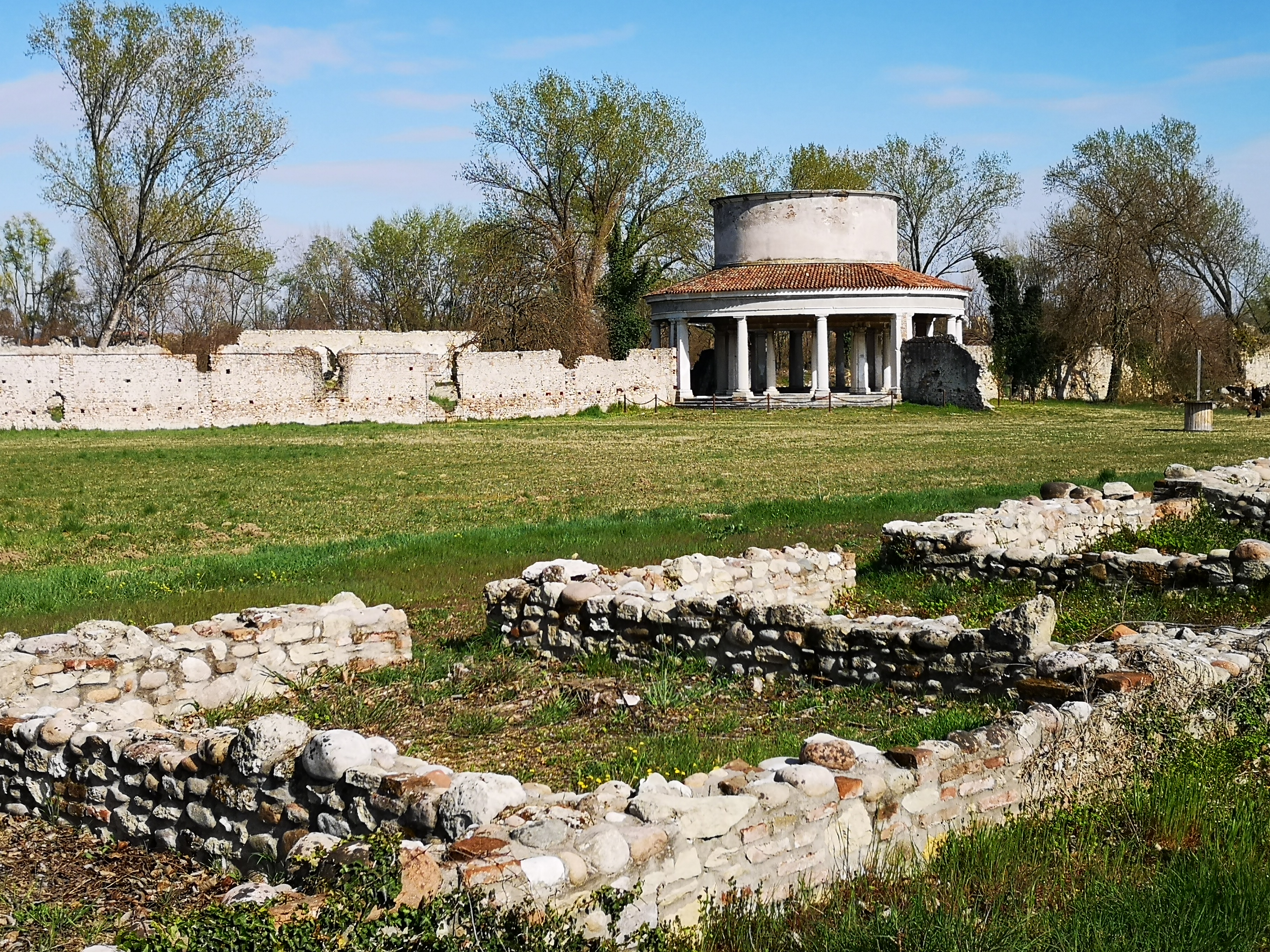
The central temple of Verona's lazaretto, without the now collapsed dome

Although Sanmicheli is best known as a military architect and for some of his palaces, there is no shortage of buildings for religious purposes in his output. His first assignment in complete autonomy was to supervise work on the Orvieto Cathedral.

All of the churches and chapels built by Sanmicheli have the feature of presenting a central plan or at least forming part of structures with centralized space. This predilection of the architect probably refers back to his study of 15th-century religious buildings, which presented the same characteristics.

==== In Orvieto ====
- Orvieto Cathedral. Design of the altar of the Magi (begun in 1512 and finished by others in 1528) and interventions on the facade around 1513, including the completion of the central tympanum.
- Petrucci funeral chapel in the church of San Domenico in Orvieto. Built around 1516 on a commission from Girolamo Petrucci.
- Cathedral of Santa Margherita (or cathedral of Montefiascone). The design dates from 1519 and was finished by others in the 17th century, after being left incomplete.
- Chapel of the Corporal at Orvieto Cathedral. Commissioned as a tomb for Orsino and Rodolfo of the Counts of Marsciano, the project was begun in 1522 and the work completed later by Simone Mosca.
- Cloister of the church of Sant'Agostino in Bagnoregio. It was built in 1524, entirely of brick.

==== In Verona ====
- Pellegrini funeral chapel in the Franciscan complex of San Bernardino in Verona. Work began in 1528 and from 1534 to 1538 was supervised by his cousin Paolo; new workers completed the work only in 1559.
- Choir screen and completion of the presbytery of Verona Cathedral. Commissioned by Bishop Gian Matteo Giberti, work began in 1534 or 35 and was completed in 1541; the pictorial decoration was done by Francesco Torbido on preliminary cartoons by Giulio Romano.
- Realization of the drum and dome of the church of San Giorgio in Braida in Verona. The work was designed by 1536 and completed in 1540 or 43.
- Lazaretto of Verona. Built beginning in 1549 outside the walls of Verona to isolate those infected with the plague, it is probably based on a reduced design from the original Sanmichelian one. Completed in 1628, as a result of damage over the centuries only the ruins of the cloister and the central temple mutilated by the dome survive.
- Facade of the church of Santa Maria in Organo in Verona. Work, supervised by his cousin Paolo, began in 1547 and continued until the end of the century.
- Chapel of the Della Torre villa in Fumane. Despite its small size, it is a prime example of Sanmicheli's church architecture.
- Bell tower of Verona Cathedral. Work began in 1555 but was soon interrupted due to structural problems, likely caused by inadequate workers. The project was then revised by Sanmicheli and work resumed in 1559 and, with more vigor, in 1561. After the master's death, work was directed, until 1579, by Bernardino Brugnoli; when work was interrupted, the structure was not completed until the 20th century to a design by Ettore Fagiuoli.
- Floor and bell tower of the church of San Giorgio in Braida in Verona. In 1557 began the laying of the flooring designed by Sanmicheli, who in the same year designed the bell tower, which remained unfinished.
- Church of the Madonna di Campagna in San Michele Extra near Verona. The project dates back to 1559, but following Sanmicheli's death the work was directed by Brugnoli.

== See also ==
- Renaissance architecture
- Bastion fort

== Bibliography ==
=== Ancient sources ===
- Bartolomeo Giuliari (1816). Cappella della famiglia Pellegrini esistente nella Chiesa di San Bernardino di Verona architettura di Michele Sanmichele. Verona: Tipografia Giuliari.
- Scipione Maffei (1732). Verona illustrata. Verona.
- Giovambattista Da Persico (1820). Descrizione di Verona e della sua provincia. Verona.
- Alessandro Pompei (1735). Li cinque ordini d'architettura civile di Michel Sanmicheli non più veduti in luce, ora pubblicati ed esposti con quelli di Vitruvio e d'altri cinque. Verona: Jacopo Vallarsi Libraio a San Sebastiano.
- Francesco Ronzani; Girolamo Luciolli (1831). Le fabbriche civili, ecclesiastiche e militari di Michele Sanmicheli. Venezia: Giuseppe Antonelli.
- Sebastiano Serlio (1537). Regole generali di architetura sopra le cinque maniere de gli edifici. Venezia: Francesco Marcolini da Forli.
- Giorgio Vasari (1568). Le vite de' più eccellenti architetti, pittori, et scultori italiani, da Cimabue insino a' tempi nostri. Edizione Giuntina. parte III, volume II.
- Diego Zannandreis (1891). Giuseppe Biadego (ed.). Le vite dei pittori scultori e architetti veronesi. Verona: Stabilimento Tipo-Litografico Franchini.

=== Modern sources ===
- Raffaello Brenzoni (June 1960). "I Sanmicheli, maestri architetti e scultori del XV e XVI sec. oriundi di Porlezza di Valsolda". Arte Lombarda: Rivista di storia dell'arte. V (1).
- Paul Davies; David Hemsoll (2004). Michele Sanmicheli. Milano: Electa.
- Lionello Puppi (1971). Michele Sanmicheli: architetto di Verona. Venezia: Marsilio.
- Lionello Puppi (1986). "Un viaggio per il Veneto di Antonio da Sangallo e di Michele Sanmicheli nella primavera del 1526". Antonio da Sangallo il giovane: la vita e l'opera. Venezia: Arti grafiche Tris.
- Giulio Sancassani (1976). "Il testamento di Giovanni Sanmicheli Lapicida, padre di Michele architetto". Atti e memorie dell'Accademia di Agricoltura, Scienze e Lettere di Verona. Vol. XXVI. Verona: Linotipia Veronese Fiorini.
- Arturo Sandrini; Pierpaolo Brugnoli (1988). Architettura a Verona nell'età della Serenissima. Verona: Banca Popolare di Verona.
- Maristella Vecchiato, ed. (2010). Itinerari sanmicheliani nella provincia di Verona. Verona: Ministero per i beni e le attività culturali, Soprintendenza per i beni architettonici e paesaggistici per le province di Verona, Rovigo e Vicenza.
