= San Domenico, Orvieto =

San Domenico
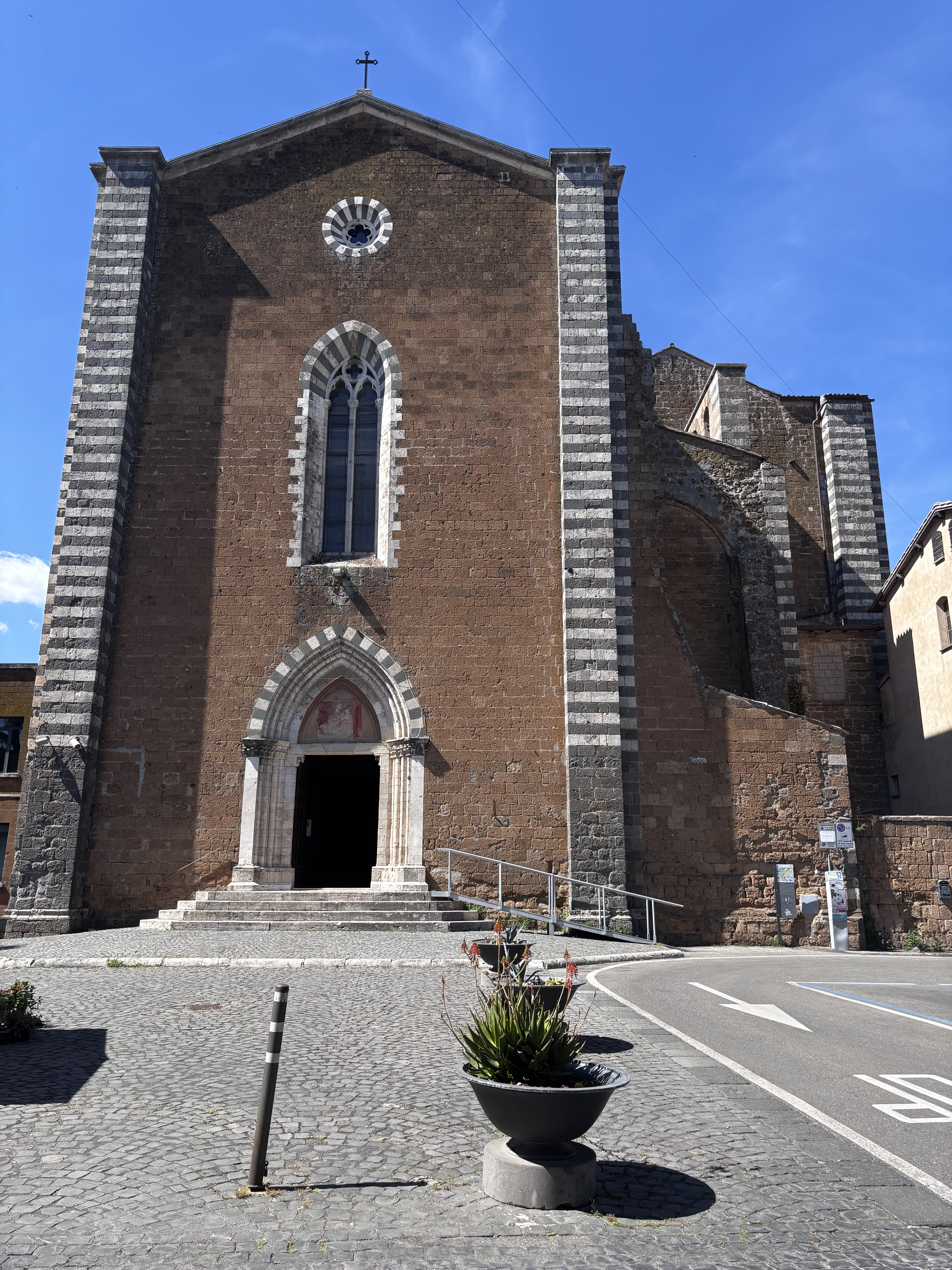
- San Domenico. The current appearance dates to the demolition of the church's main building in 1932.

- San Domenico in Umbria
- 42.7211°N 12.1134°E
- Location: Orvieto, Umbria
- Country: Italy
- Religious institute: Dominican Order

History
- Founded: 1233

Architecture
- Demolished: 1932

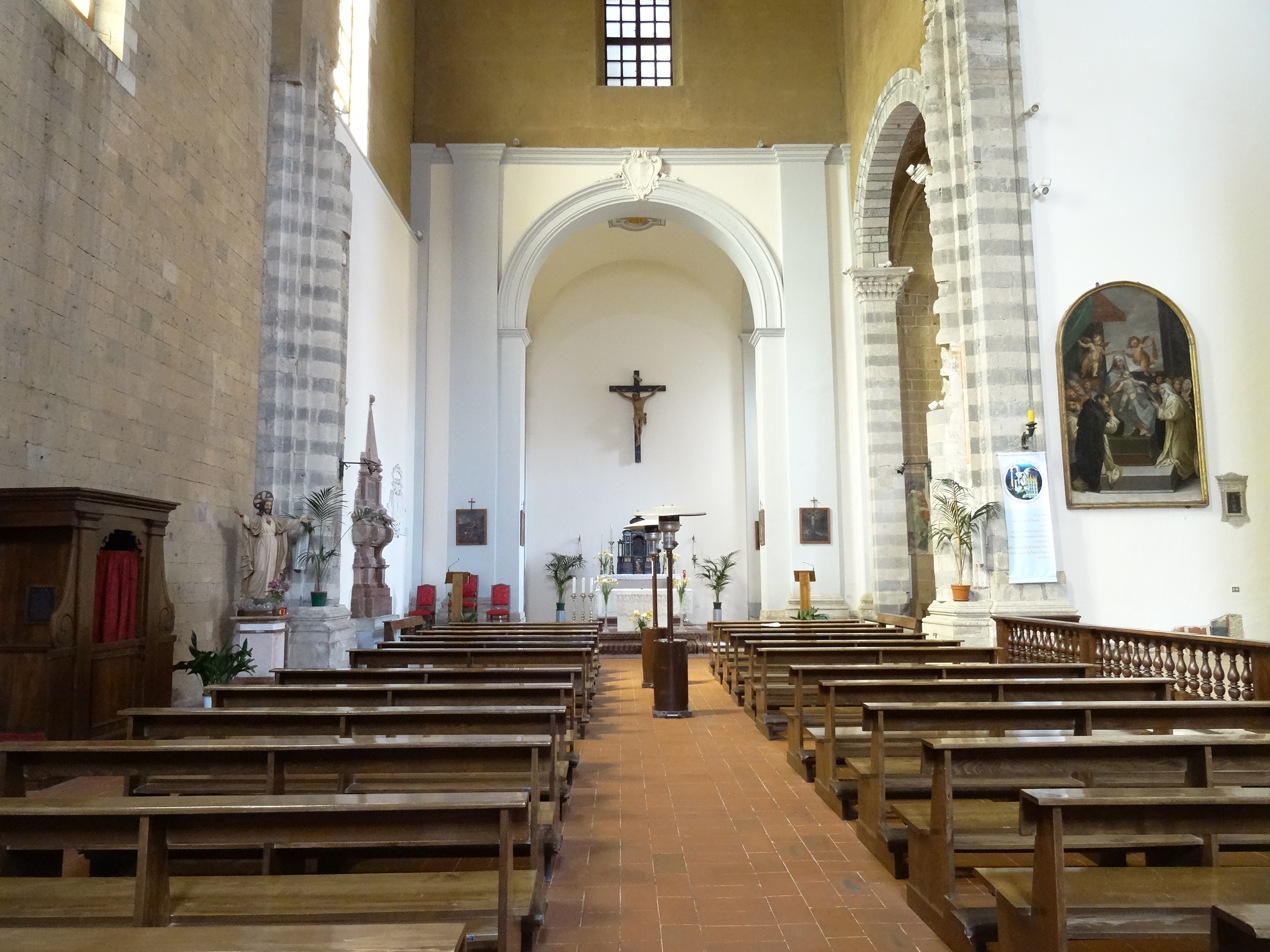
Interior of the church.

San Domenico is a Gothic architecture, Roman Catholic church located on Piazza Ventinove Marzo in Orvieto, Umbria, central Italy.

Putatively this was the site of the former pagan temple of Minerva, and subsequently of the parish church named Santa Pace. Construction of a Dominican monastery and church here begun in 1233 about a decade after the death of Dominic de Guzmán, and a year prior to his canonization. in 1234. It is one of the first churches of the Dominican Order. The original San Domenico and the monastery was enlarged under the papacy of Urban IV by cardinal Annibaldo Annibaldeschi.

The edifice had a nave and two aisles but always remained incomplete. In the 17th-century, the church was truncated, opening some of the space in the piazza in front, and what remains today are only the apse and the transept, after most of the church was demolished in 1932 to house the Female Academy of Gymnastics.

The church is notable for housing the desk used by St Thomas Aquinas for his lessons at Orvieto during his sojourn in the city (1263–1264), as well as the Monument to Cardinal De Braye, sculpted by Arnolfo di Cambio around 1282. As proved by restorations, the statues of the Madonna included in the latter is in fact a 2nd-century BC Roman one. Also in the church is the Petrucci Chapel, designed by Michele Sanmicheli in 1516-1523 under the choir. It has an octagonal plan and several sculptures.

The church was home to the San Domenico Polyptych by Simone Martini (1323–1324), now in the Orvieto Cathedral's Museum.
