= Porta Palio, Verona =

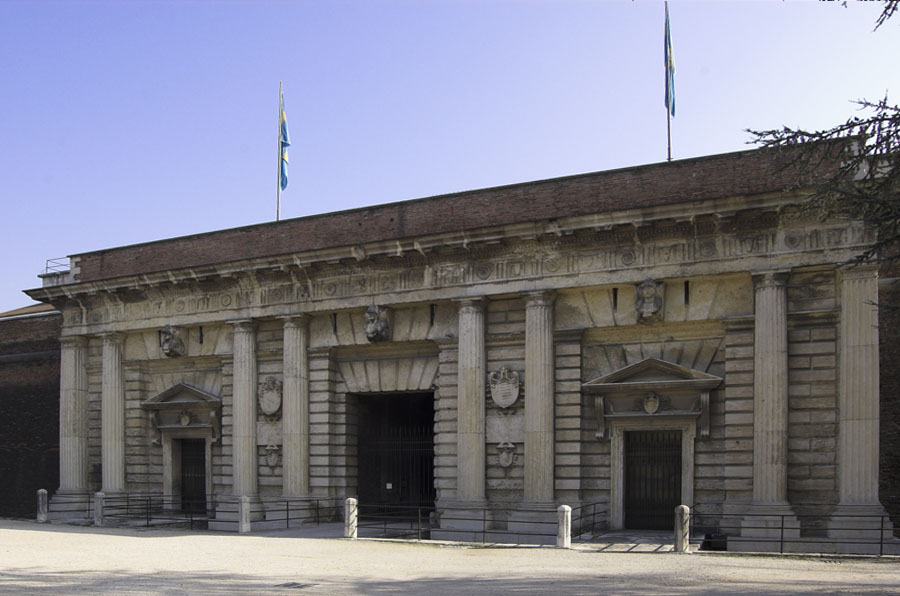
Porta Palio

Porta Palio is a gate or portal of the former outer medieval walls of the city of Verona, Italy. It was designed and built during 1550–1561 by the architect Michele Sanmicheli.

The robust Doric columns give the structure elegance and convey strength. The site previously had a medieval portal, called the Palio gate because it was used during a race.

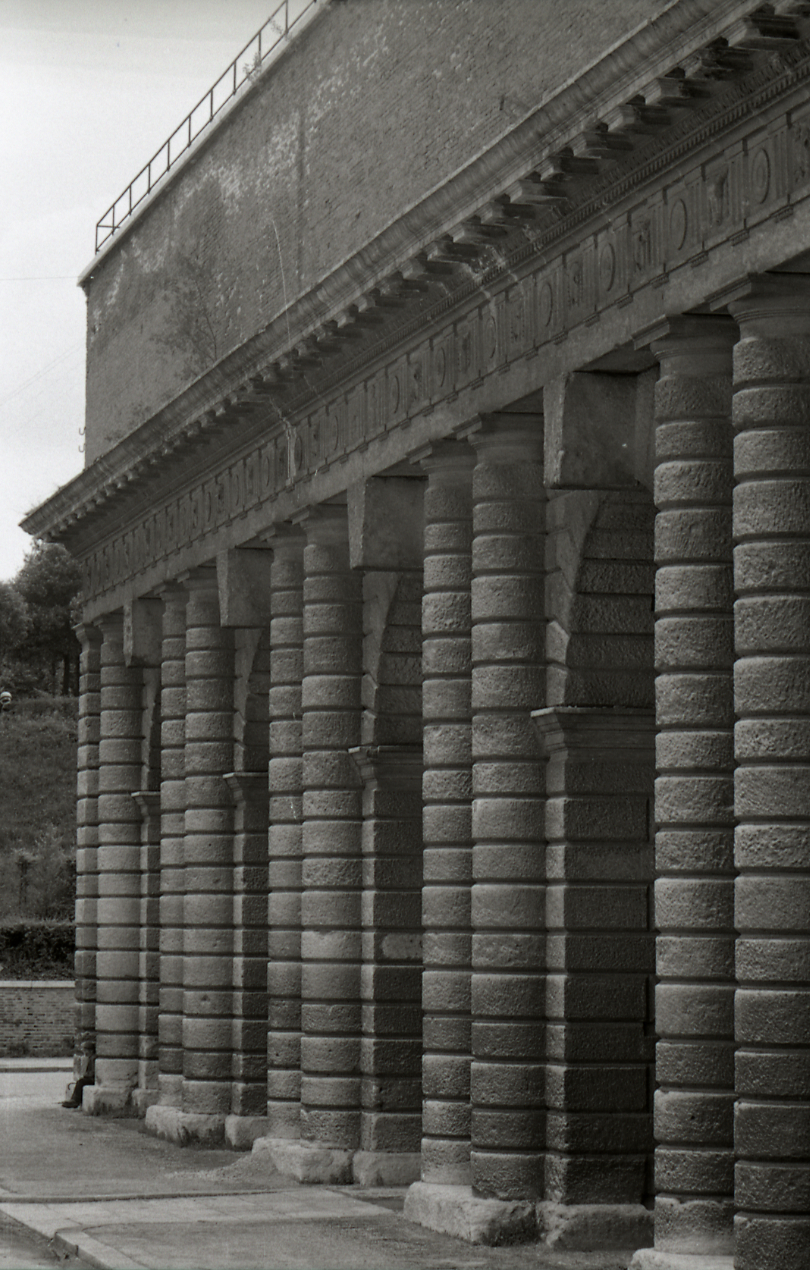
Side view. Photo by Paolo Monti, 1972

== See also ==
- Porta Borsari
- Porta Leoni
- Porta Nuova, Verona
