= Giovanni Battista Troiani =

Italian sculptor

Giovanni Battista Troiani (Villafranca di Verona, February 12, 1844 – Villafranca di Verona, 1927) was an Italian sculptor

He studied first in Verona at the Accademia Cignaroli, then at Venice at the Academy of Fine Arts, and finally in Florence under Giovanni Duprè. For many years, he lived in Cagliari, but also traveled to America and England.

Among his works are : I frati suonatori; Gaius Marius trapped in the swamps of Minturno; Prometeo; Uno scompiglio; I moschettieri; Un colpo di vento; Un Bersagliere; Un Artigliere; Un Portabandiera; the Monument to the architect Michele Sammicheli in Verona. This latter monument, his best known work, stands in the city center of Verona. At the base of the monument, is a relief depicting Sammicheli refusing honors and commissions from Emperor Charles V, and staying instead to work in his native Veneto.

Other works include: Un alpigianello; Un pescatore; Una fioraina; Ecco la mamma!; and Un duetto (boy playing a mandolin with his dog). Among his reliefs are Vittorio Emanuele a Palestro; and Musica sacra. Troiani won five prizes at the Academy of Venice, a silver medal of honor at the Exposition pure of Venice; a bronze medal at the 1887 Exposition regionale of Tuscany, and an honorable silver medal of honor at the 1886 Exhibition at Liverpool. The marble altar of the church of San Antonio Abate in Cagliari was completed by Troiani. He also completed a number of funereal monuments in the local cemetery.
