= Via San Cosimo Archaeological area =

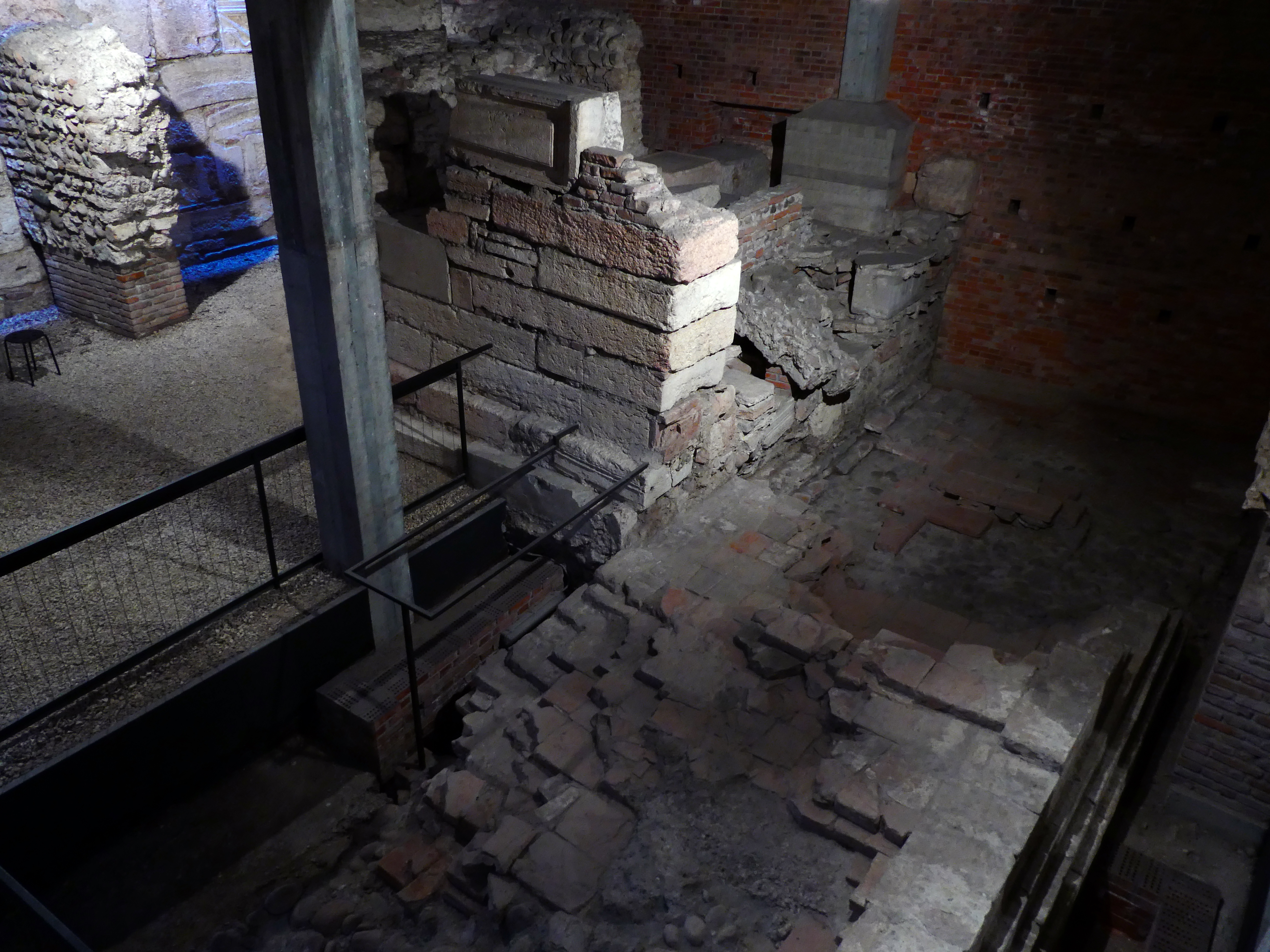
- Part of the city wall visible in the site
- Interactive map of Via San Cosimo Archaeological area
- 45°26′21.49″N 10°59′50.57″E
- Type: City wall
- Periods: 1st century BC - 5th century AD
- Cultures: Roman and Late Antiquity
- Location: Italy, Verona

Site notes
- Discovered: 1971
- Management: Superintendence of archaeology, fine arts and landscape for the provinces of Verona, Rovigo and Vicenza
- Public access: yes

The archaeological area of via San Cosimo is located in via San Cosimo 3 in Verona, near the ancient Roman city walls and below the courtyard belonging to the institute of the Daughters of Jesus. The site includes a portion of the city wall built in the late-Republican age (second half of the 1st century BC) with subsequent additions, a domus dating back to the 1st century AD with high-quality pavementation and, on the outer side of the Republican walls, a section of the second city wall built by Theodoric the Great between the end of the 5th and the first quarter of the 6th century AD, at a distance of about 8 meters from the late-Republican one.

== Excavation history ==
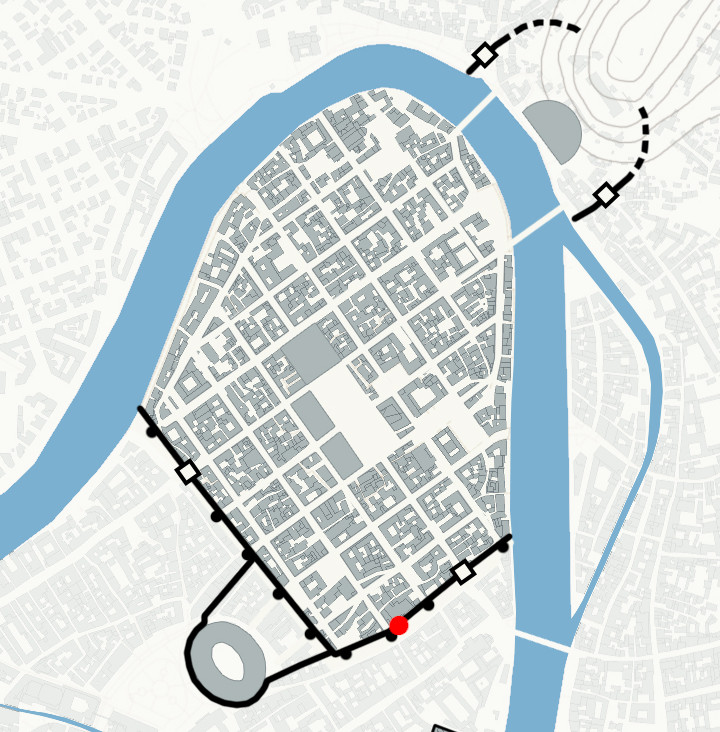
Location of the archaeological site in Imperial age Verona

The site was discovered in 1971 during the construction of a cistern inside the building that houses the sisters of the congregation of the Daughters of Jesus, in via San Cosimo 3. The excavation was conducted by the then Superintendence of Antiquities of Venice (at present Superintendence of archaeology, fine arts and landscape for the provinces of Verona, Rovigo and Vicenza), which also dealt with the securing of the place so that an archaeological area was created: the San Cosimo area was thus one of the first archaeological areas of the city.

In 2020, the site was given to a non-profit aorganization that, thanks also to a refurbishment intervention, now allows visits to the public.

== Description ==
=== Republican city wall ===
The oldest part of the site consists of a portion of the ancient Roman walls of the Republican era (more precisely of the second half of the 1st century BC). This portion consists of a foundation, made from cobblestone and just under 4 meters thick, and an elevation made by using sesquipedalian bricks held together by fine lime-based mortar. At the base the wall has a width of 3.60 meters which narrows in section going upwards, by means of some recesses: the outer side, after a base of four rows and two initial recesses of two rows, rose marked by a regular series of recesses, one every six courses of bricks. It is believed that the original height, measured at the chemin de ronde, was of about 8 meters high.

In this portion of the wall it also can be seen the base of a defensive tower that was added after the construction of the original wall, probably ascribable to the emperor Gallienus (3rd century AD). Its dimensions are 5.50 meters long by 3.50 meters wide and it was built using repurposed material, mostly originally part of funerary contexts, bound together with earth mortar. To increase its defensive capabilities on the front side, a triangular spur was later added to the tower, also partially visible.

=== Theodorician city wall ===
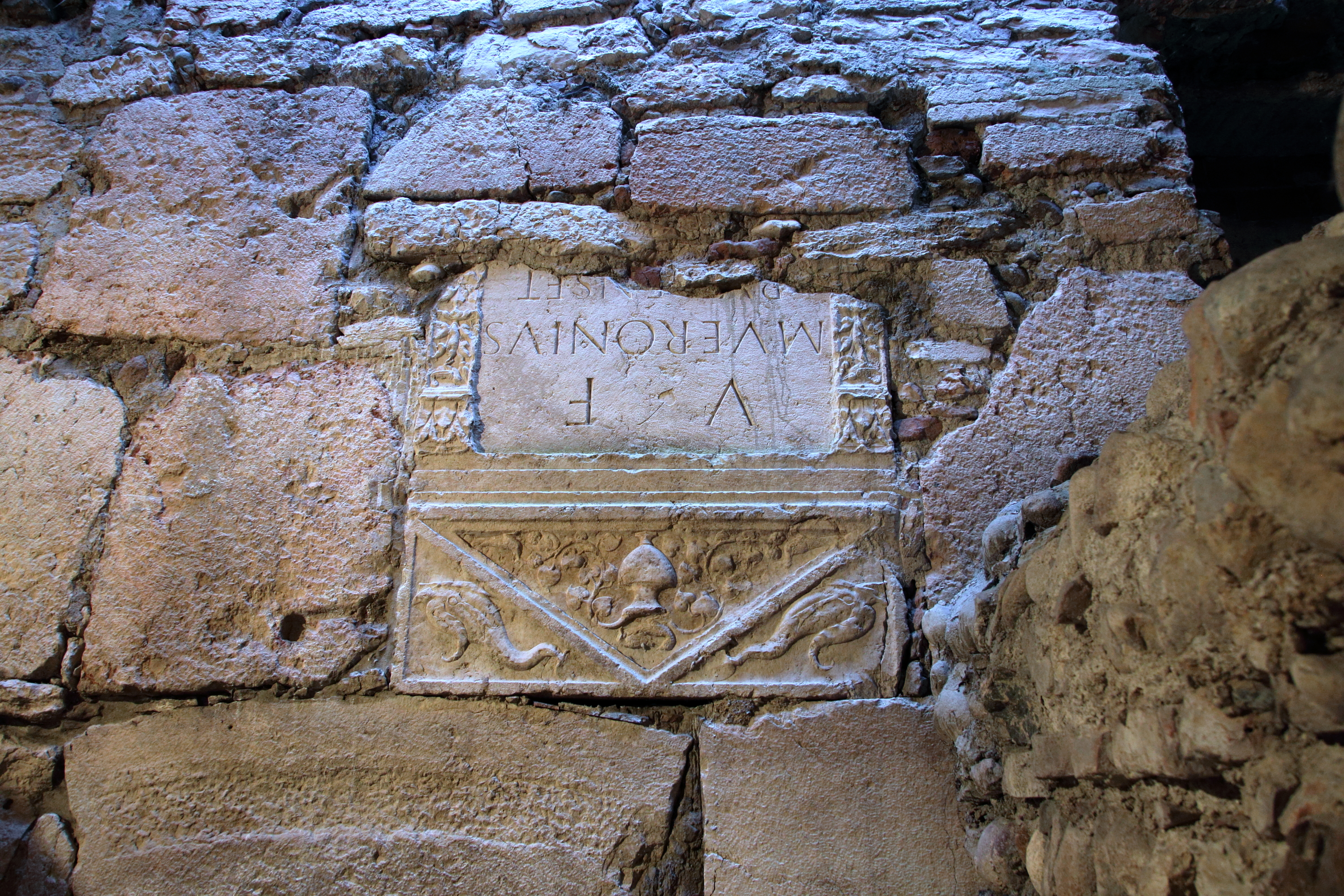
Theodoric's wall in which the salvaged materials can be seen (tombstone arranged upside down)

After the fall of the Roman Empire and under the reign of Theodoric the Great (second half of the 5th century A.D.), another rampart was added to the original city wall that traces closely the path of the previous defense, located a dozen meters further inside and acquired a military function at that time, creating a system with the new Theodoric walls, which were almost twice as high as the Roman ones - as much as 13.65 meters. In the archaeological site of via San Cosimo a portion of this belt is visible, at this point it is distant 8 meters from the original one and that has been preserved up to about 10 meters high.

This Roman-Germanic era rampart was also largely made using bare material coming from both funerary monuments and the demolition of the outer ring of the nearby Veronese amphitheater, from which square blocks of limestone were obtained.

A 2022 study highlights the complexity of the different construction phases and recognizes an organic system within the construction of the works close to the Republican-era rampart, namely the tower and the buttress, and the construction of the second defensive wall. The analysis of some structural elements would in fact seem to suggest their function as a connection between the two ramparts.

=== The domus ===
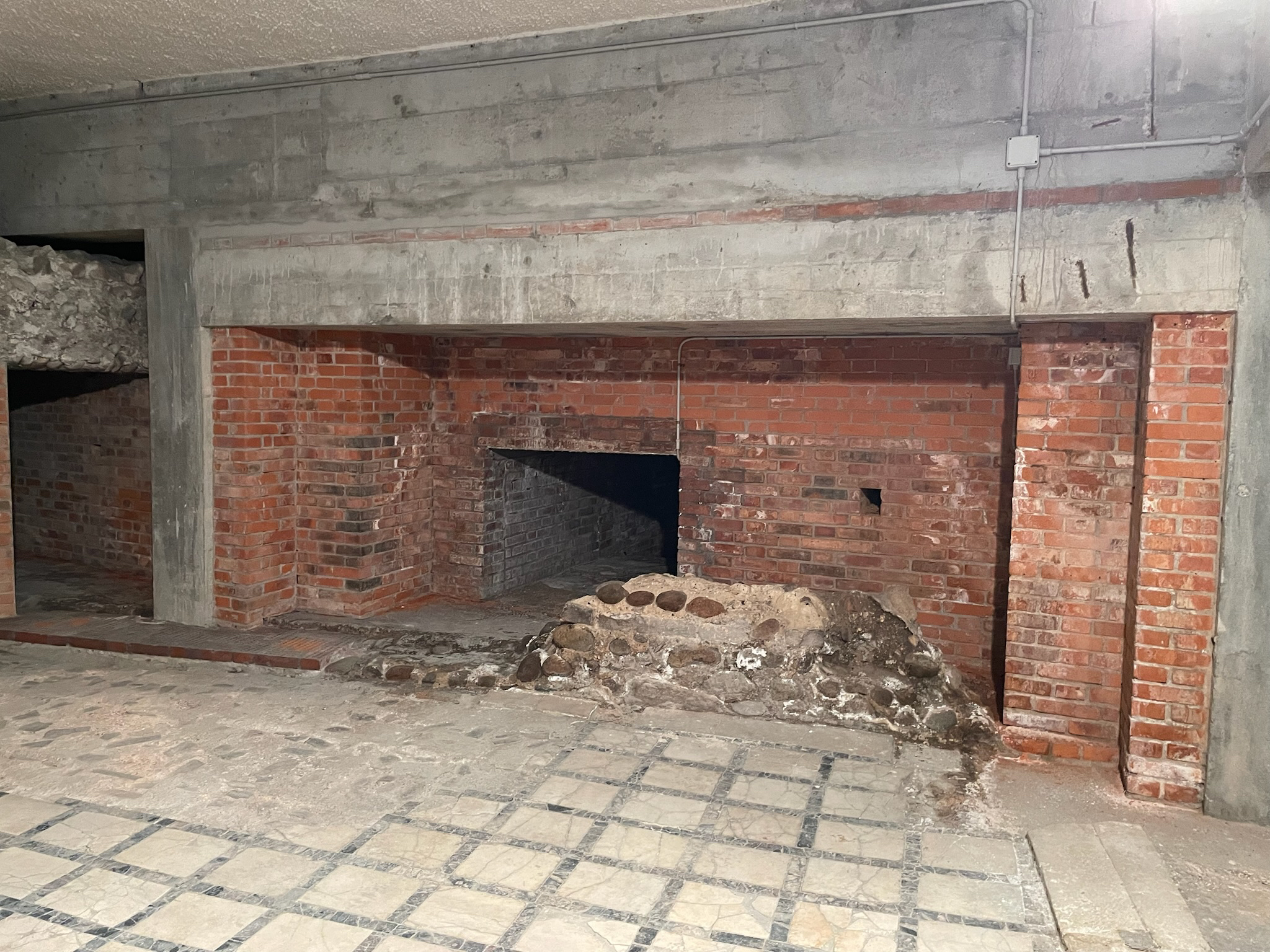
Floor of the domus of via San Cosimo

The remains of a domus dating back to the 1st century can be found leaning against the inner walls of the late Republican rampart: this location shows how Verona's city space was intensively used. Mainly two rooms of this building are still recognizable, separated by narrow service rooms and decorated with mosaic and marble floors (opus sectile) with geometric motifs. The service rooms are instead paved with wrought scales, while the area corresponding to the covered courtyard had an opus signinum floor in which black and white tiles emerge.

== See also ==
- Roman walls of Verona
- History of Verona

== Bibliography ==
- Basso, Patriza (2013). Cavalieri Manasse, Giuliana (ed.). L'età romana e tardoantica, in Storia dell'architettura nel Veneto. Venezia: Marsilio. ISBN 978-88-317-1712-0.
- Bonetto, Jacopo (2009). "Veneto". Archeologia delle Regioni d'Italia. Roma: Istituto Poligrafico e Zecca dello Stato. ISBN 978-88-240-1324-6.
- Cavalieri Manasse, Giuliana; Hudson, Peter John (1999). "Nuovi dati sulle fortiﬁcazioni di Verona (III-XI secolo)". Le fortiﬁcazioni del Garda e i sistemi di difesa dell'Italia settentrionale tra tardo antico e alto medioevo (PDF). Mantova: S.A.P. pp. 71–91. Archived from the original (PDF) on 30 June 2020.
- Pugliese, Luciano; Leopardi, Antonio (2022). "Analisi delle evidenze murarie e nuovi elementi interpretativi sulle fortificazioni di Verona nel contesto dell'area archeologica di Via San Cosimo". Archeologia Medievale. XLIX. pp. 51–162.
