= Roman walls of Verona =

Defensive fortification in Verona, Italy

- Verona, Veneto in Italy
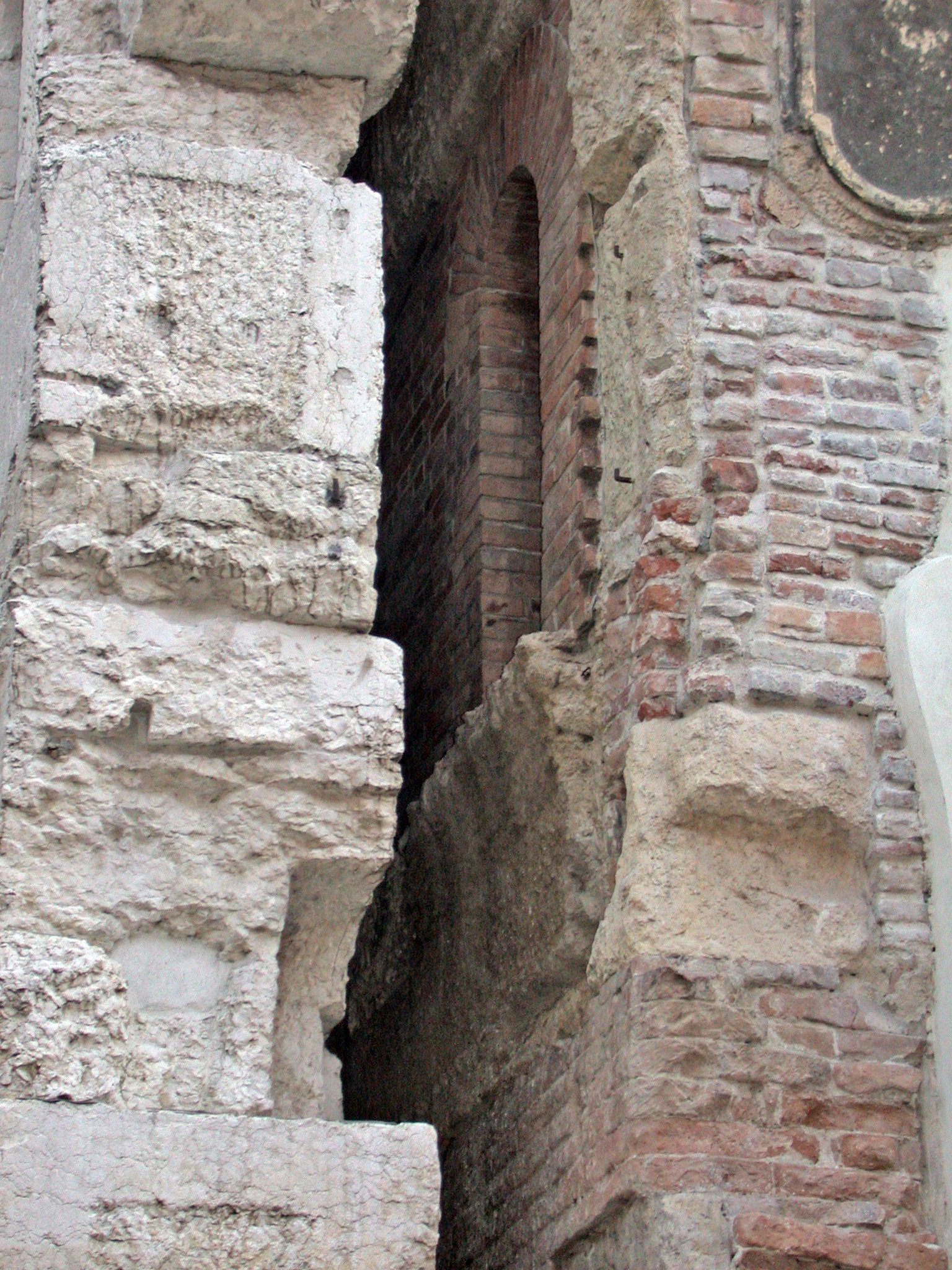
- Republican-era brick masonry flanked by stone masonry from the Imperial period, near Porta Leoni.

Site information
- Condition: Visible archaeological remains

Location
- Coordinates: 45°26′28.72″N 10°59′50.98″E

Site history
- Fate: Large sections demolished or incorporated into medieval and modern buildings

The Roman walls of Verona were an important defensive curtain wall equipped with numerous towers and monumental gates, built in several successive construction phases starting in the late Republican age and continuing through the early Roman-Germanic kingdoms.

The first phase of construction of the defenses began around the second half of the 1st century B.C., following Verona's attainment of the rank of Roman municipium. In the 3rd century, a second phase of renovation and enlargement of the city walls took place at the urging of Emperor Gallienus. In the early 6th century, Theodoric the Great had the Roman city defenses strengthened again, adding a second circle. Today few archaeological ruins of the walls remain, while the two main gates, Porta Borsari and Porta Leoni, are better preserved.

== History ==
=== Foundation of Verona and construction of the walls ===
The city of Verona was, since ancient times, a strategic location for the control of the transalpine routes that connected the Po Valley with central Europe via the Adige Valley. The temporary occupation of the city in 102-101 B.C. by the Cimbri revealed for the first time in the eyes of the Roman Senate the importance of the control and defense of this town, at that time still under the rule of the Venetian allies. There is a lack of knowledge of the ancient fortified oppidum that stood on the San Pietro hill, the site where the protohistoric settlement of Verona had developed; only a section of a opus quadratum bastion made of local tuff, preceded by a counterscarp wall, made it possible to infer how the Venetian settlement had been fortified in 90 B.C.

The final Romanization of Transpadan Gaul, and thus of Verona, took place in the spring of 49 B.C., when the tribune of the plebs Lucius Roscius Fabatus proposed a law, named in his honor Lex Roscia, granting Roman citizenship to the inhabitants between the Po and the Alps. The law passed without opposition: Verona became a Roman municipium and was administratively regulated according to the normal quattuorviral constitution.

Having gained control of Verona, Rome's rulers decided to fortify the city so as to consolidate the Alpine border and create a bridgehead for possible future military ventures. An issue immediately arose concerning the location of the settlement. As mentioned, the town of Venetian origin had sprung up along the slopes of St. Peter's Hill, in an area that was no longer sufficient either for the future development of the settlement or to allow for its orderly planning, typical of Roman town planning.

A new center was therefore founded on the other bank of the Adige River, where its wide bends formed a kind of natural peninsula, a valid defense against possible attacks. This also made it possible to build only two sections of curtain wall along the southern side of the city, the only one that was not naturally defended by the river. The curtain wall was provided with two main gates, Porta Iovia (now called Borsari) along the decumanus maximus and Porta Leoni on the cardinalus maximus. A series of towers were placed at the decumanus and minor cardinus that acted as posterns: some of them were provided with a passage for chariots in the center of the street and two smaller side passages for pedestrians, at the sidewalks.

Around 10 B.C., two large monumental gates were built on the left side of the Adige, one of which was located north of the ancient pons lapideus and one south of the "new" pons marmoreus, now called St. Stephen's Gate and St. Faustinus' Gate, respectively; they were built, for matters of urban decorum, quite similar to those located on the right side of the Adige. All four major gates, already around the first half of the 1st century, underwent renovation and monumentalization of the main elevations, which were made of marble, hiding the ancient brick elevations.

=== Restorations and extensions following the first barbarian invasions ===
Around the middle of the third century, Verona found itself at the center of a clash between the legitimate emperor, Philip the Arab, and his rival, Decius. This dispute, which ended in a battle fought at the city and the death of the emperor, encouraged in the second half of the century the attack of barbarian populations on the borders of the Roman Empire, and reaffirmed the strategic importance of Roman Verona. The center, in particular, went through a moment of serious danger when, in 258, the Alemanni broke through Rhaetia and the Adige Valley into the Po Valley.

Emperor Gallienus succeeded in defeating them under the walls of Mediolanum. This episode made it clear that the Danubian limes was becoming increasingly fragile and insufficient to protect the borders of the peninsula. It was precisely for this reason that Gallienus decided to return Verona to its role as an Italic bulwark, which it had already fulfilled during the late Republican age.

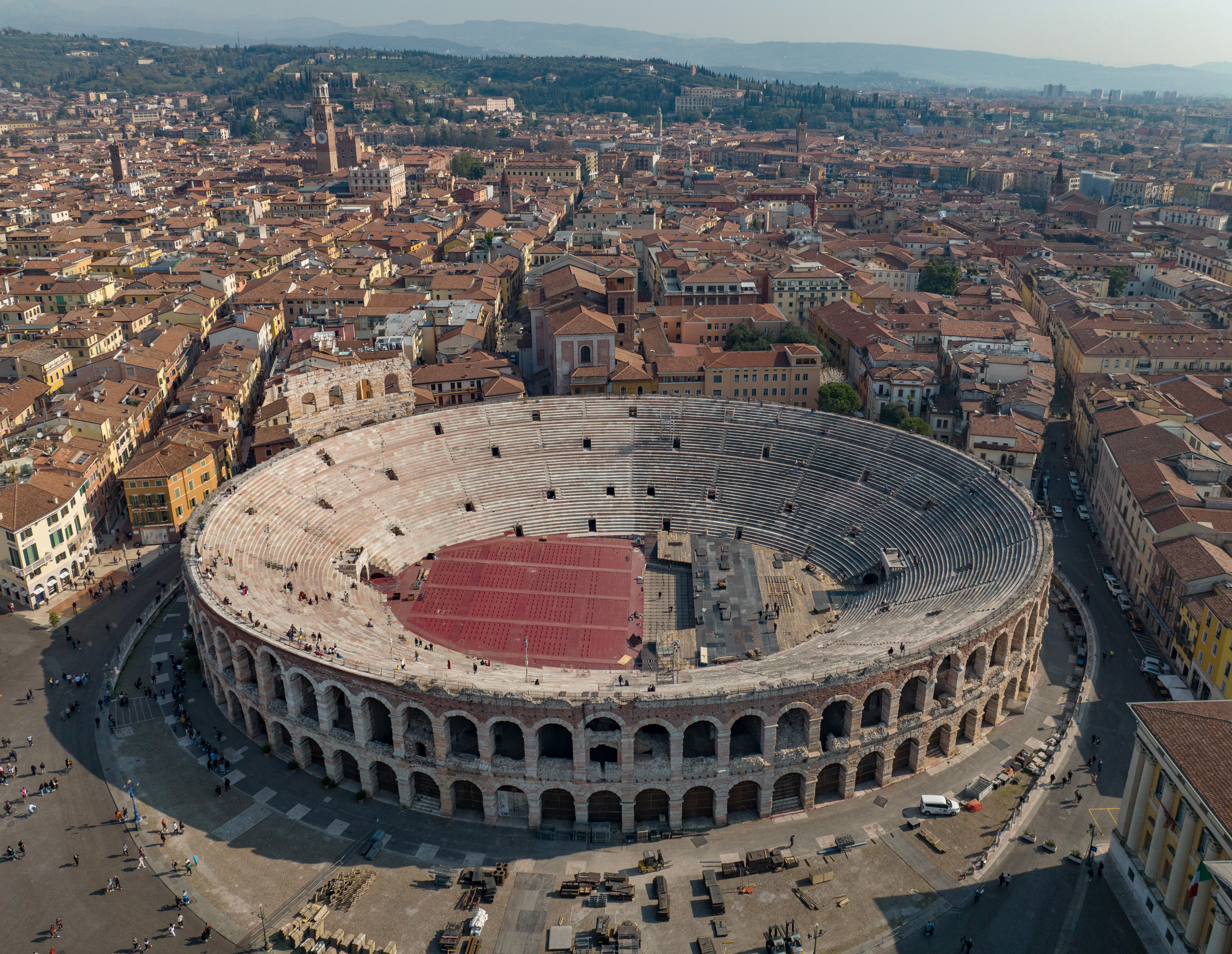
Verona's amphitheater, which remained excluded from the republican-era city walls, was strategically included in the later curtain wall ordered by Emperor Gallienus

The old republican walls were no longer as effective as they once were. The city's imposing Roman amphitheater was located just outside them and, if conquered by enemy forces, could pose a danger to the city itself. Gallienus therefore decided to renovate and reinforce the Republican-era city wall, including by leaning square reinforcing towers against the outer face, and to build an addition to the 550-meter curtain wall, so as to enclose and protect the amphitheater as well.

The work lasted only seven months, from April 3 to December 4, 265: the remarkable speed with which the new curtain wall was built is revealed by the extensive use of bare materials in a rather haphazard masonry. The suburban neighborhoods that had developed between the republican curtain wall and the natural depression of the Adigetto, thus outside the more consolidated fabric, remained excluded from the defensive system because they were too extensive and difficult to defend.

The emperor may have also fortified the other side of the Adige River, to defend the monumental area that had sprung up on the slopes of St. Peter's Hill, in particular the Roman theater, and the access to the two bridges, the pons lapideus and the pons marmoreus. Through these interventions Gallienus succeeded in endowing Verona with once again harmonious and effective defenses, suitable for controlling both river traffic and the route of the Adige valley, from where the danger of aggression was greater.

Evolution of the Roman walls

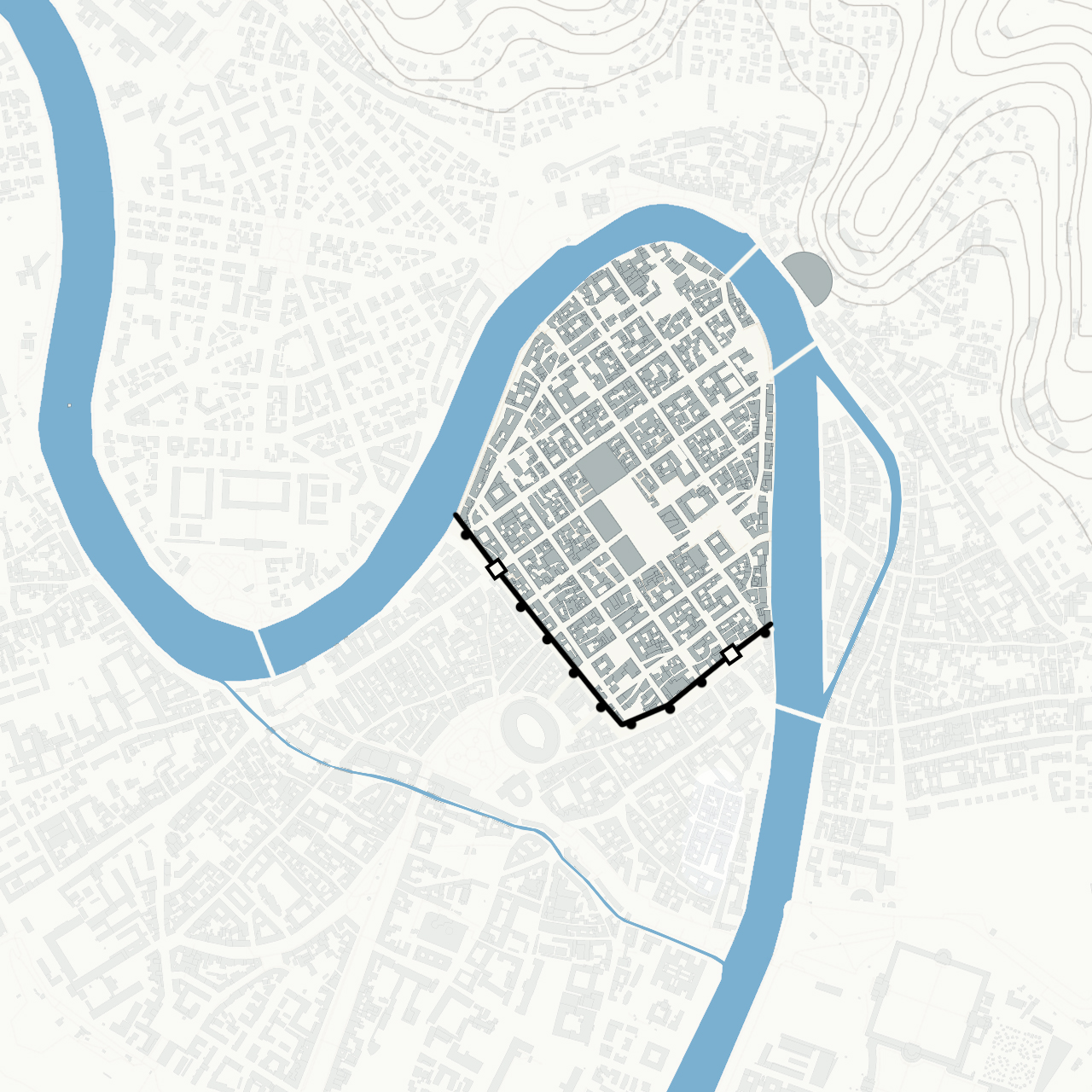
A reconstruction of Verona in the Republican Age

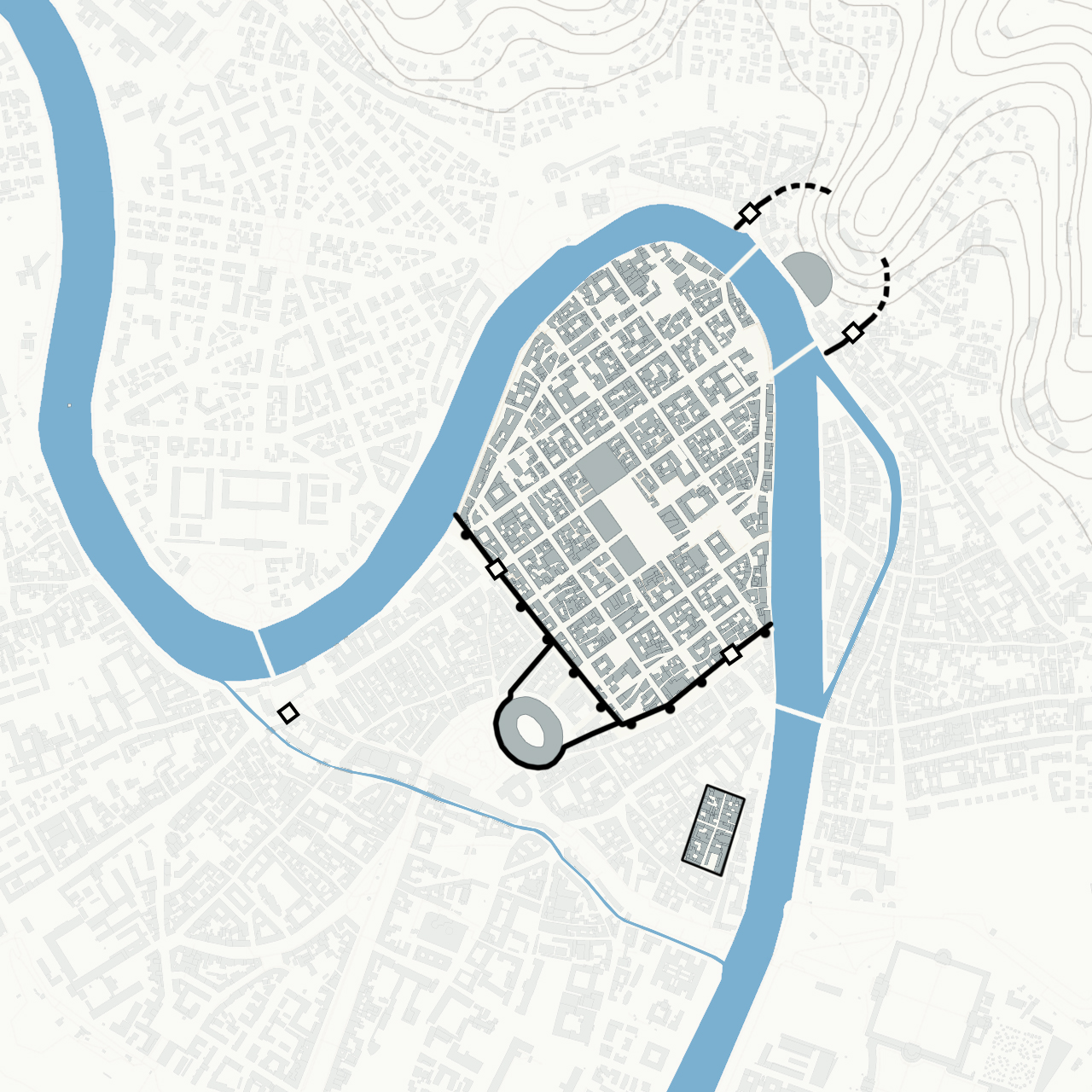
A reconstruction of Verona in the imperial age

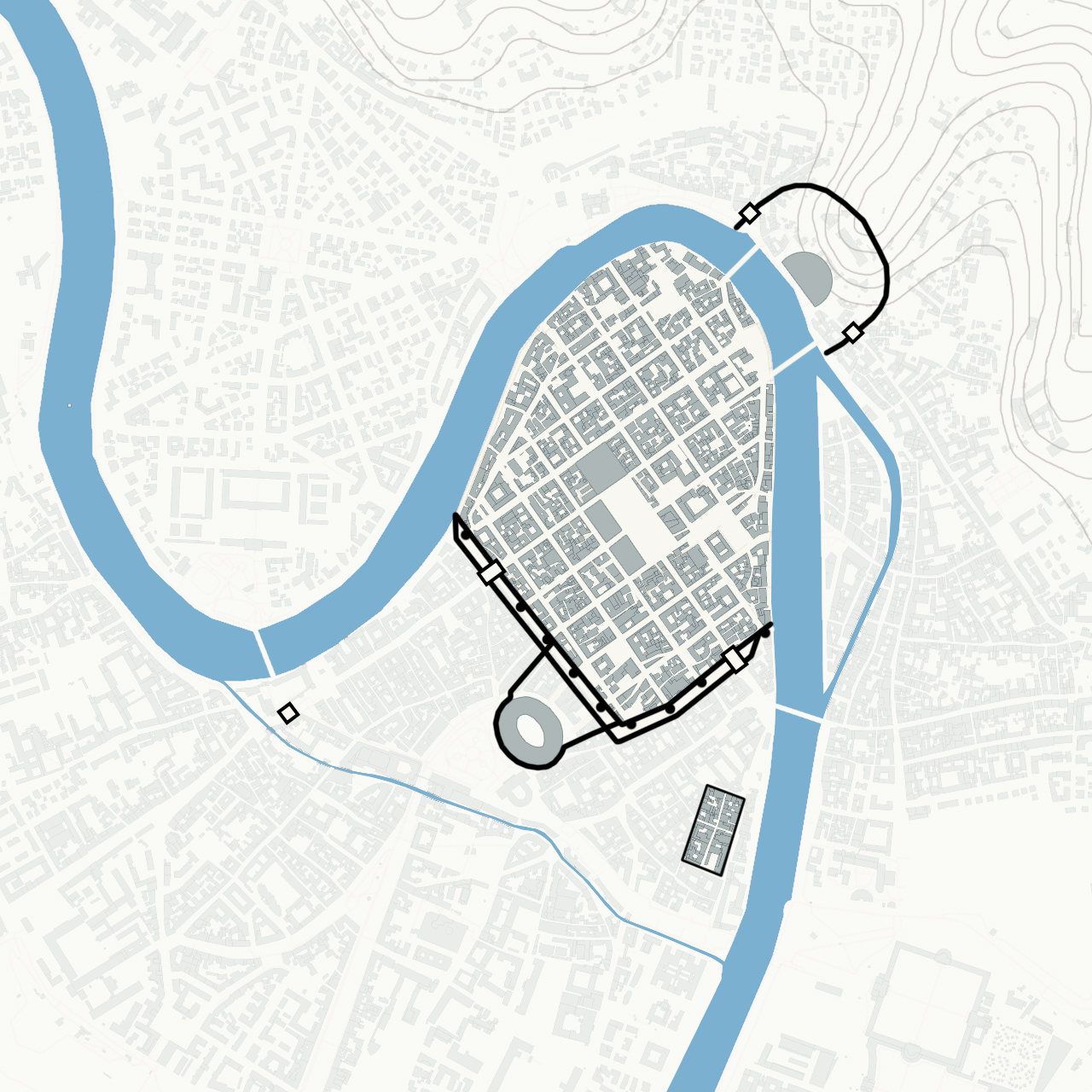
A reconstruction of Verona in the Theodoric age

Outside the curtain wall, to the south of the city center, there must have been several forts used as defensive outposts of the city, built or renovated during the interventions enforced by Emperor Gallienus. One of the forts would have been located near an important road junction, at which the road coming from Hostilia and the southern ring road with the Via Postumia and the Via Gallica converged.

A second fort must have stood in the area now occupied by Castelvecchio, guarding the intersection of the Via Postumia and Via Gallica. The presence of a real castrum, also from the late imperial period, has also been hypothesized in the extramural area between via Filippini, via Dietro Filippini, Oratorio alley and via Satiro, as evidenced by the strongly geometric and evocative shape of the urban layout in that sector of the city, which is still perfectly visible today.

=== Fall of the empire and expansions by Theodoric ===
Around the years of the fall of the Roman Empire, the wall structures underwent further modifications. The towers were fitted with triangular spurs, and pentagonal towers were added to the old Roman walls. The arches of the posterns of the hinges and minor decumans were closed. These arrangements suggest that such devices were necessary to protect against Attila's invasion in 452, or for Odoacer's entrenchment in the face of Theodoric's advance in 489.

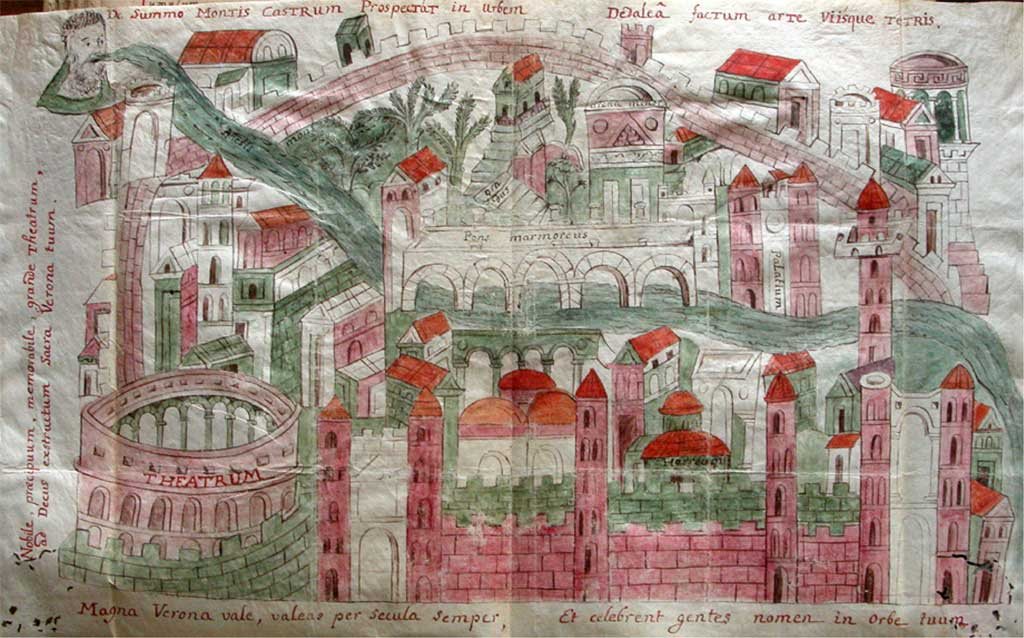
The Raterian Iconography makes it possible to trace the Republican and Imperial walls (in bright green) and those built by Theodoric (pinkish)

Around the beginning of the 6th century, a second city wall was commissioned by Theodoric, who devoted great attention to the city, on the left side of the Adige, which made a system with the older curtain wall of late Republican origin, placed about ten meters further inland. At the same time, ravelins were introduced in front of Porta Borsari and Porta Leoni, and the walls that Emperor Gallienus had built around the Veronese amphitheater were raised. The extensions and this second curtain wall were made, like the Gallienian one, through the use of spoil materials, although in this case the construction was less hasty and the construction technique of decidedly more careful workmanship.

Theodoric could also be credited with the building, or at least the reconstruction, of the city walls around the hill of San Pietro on the left side of the Adige River. Among the clues that would point to his commissioning would be both written and material sources.

Written sources include the Iconografia rateriana, a 10th-century map depicting Verona, in which the Republican-era curtain wall and the one surrounding the amphitheater are depicted in a bright green color, while the outermost curtain wall to the right of the Adige and the hillside are in a pinkish color, thus lending greater credibility to the hypothesis that the latter two are contemporary. From a material point of view, an indication of the construction of a new curtain wall that would have protected the hill comes from the fact that the apsidal part of the church of St. Stephen, a building dating back to the fifth century, was sacrificed for the construction of the curtain wall.

These defenses remained substantially unchanged from then until the pre-communal era due to continuous maintenance; later, with the construction of the outermost communal and Scaliger walls, those of Roman origin lost their functionality and usefulness: over the centuries they were partly tampered with and partly reused by houses and palaces that leaned against them.

== Description ==
=== Republican walls ===
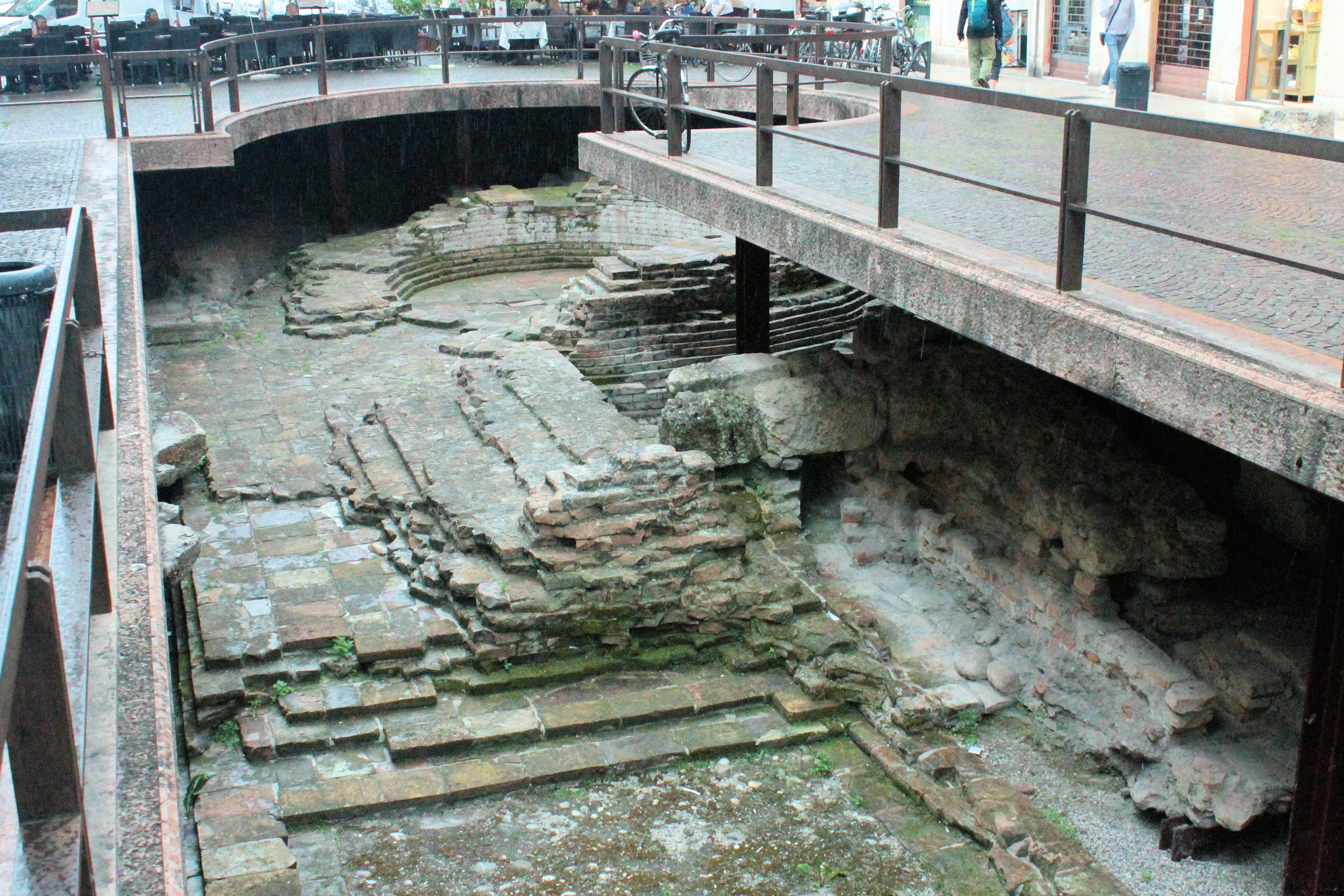
Brick foundations from the Republican period, belonging to the lost portion of Porta Leoni

The late-Republican walls were divided into two sectors, one to the southwest and one to the southeast. The southwest sector followed, set back about ten meters toward the ancient center, the alignment formed by Via Diaz, Vicolo S. Andrea, Corte Farina, Vicolo del Guasto, Piazza S. Nicolò and Via Frattini. Just before Via Leoncino, the walls bent southeastward, to reconnect with the Adige with a layout that roughly corresponds to that of Via Leoncino-via Amanti.

The two segments both started from the bank of the Adige and continued in a northwest-southeast and northeast-southwest direction, respectively, in keeping with the orientation of the urban layout of Roman Verona. The defensive curtain was 940 meters long and bounded an area with an approximate surface area of 430,000 m^{2}. The two gates Borsari and Leoni, open in the two sections of the wall, allowed access to the city from the southeast and southwest, respectively.

The curtain wall had a cobblestone conglomerate foundation with a section of almost 4 meters. The elevation started from a width of as much as 3.60 meters at the base and narrowed in section going upward, by means of some recesses: the front towards the countryside, after a plinth of four rows and two initial recesses of two rows, rose up marked by a regular series of recesses, one every six courses of bricks. This was a common building technique in central Italic settings as early as the beginning of the first century B.C. and documented in Cisalpine Gaul a little later in the same century. The elevation toward the city had a rectilinear profile, free of recesses.

=== Imperial walls ===
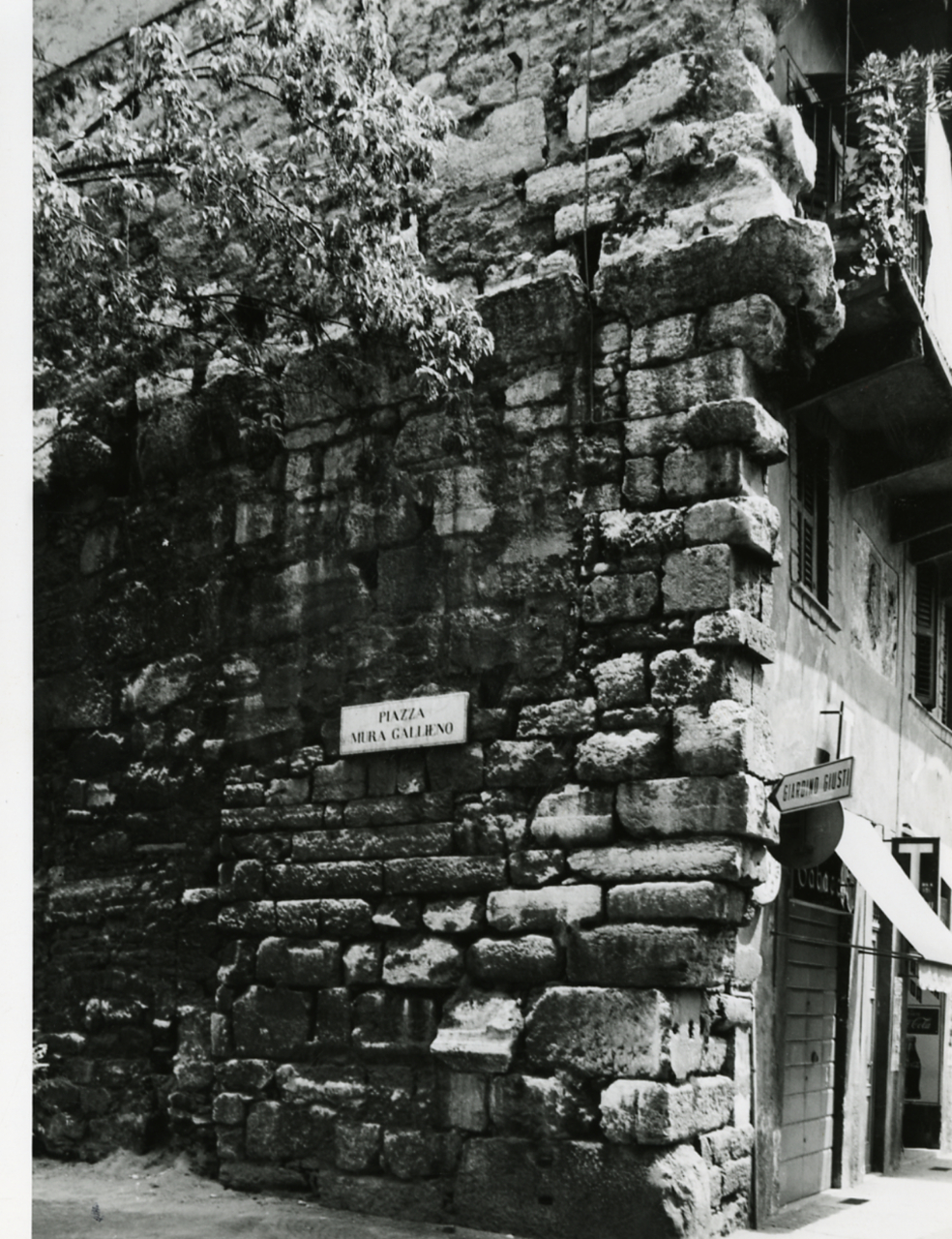
The walls of Gallienus near the Arena of Verona, in a 1972 photograph by Paolo Monti

A major monumentalization intervention invested the city of Verona in the first half of the first century, involving most of the city's public spaces and buildings: in this context, the two main city gates, Porta Borsari and Porta Leoni, were renovated by leaning against the previous republican brick structure a new stone prospectus, of great scenographic impact.

Later the old curtain wall of the Republican period was renovated and reinforced by Emperor Gallienus with the aim of giving the still compact urban center the steadfastness and organicity proper to a fortress, also through the addition of some pentagonal towers and triangular spurs to the recovered Republican towers. The new 550-meter-long walls were built to include the Roman amphitheater, which was too looming over the ramparts not to pose a real danger to the city, being only 80 meters away from the walls and exceeding them in height by about 23 meters.

The new walls that surrounded the Arena of Verona reconnected to the Republican ones by means of two wings that traced the routes of Via Mazzini and Via Leoncino. This section was 7.5 meters high, maintaining the same height as the previous one. On this occasion, extensive use was made of rubble blocks probably from necropolises, street pavements and public buildings.

There was a possible construction of an appendage of the walls also on the left bank of the Adige, which allowed for protection from possible attacks from the north of both the Roman theater of Verona and the Pietra and Postumio bridges. The route of the new walls beyond the Adige would have started upstream of the pons lapideus continuing with a curvilinear section in Via Santo Stefano, while beyond the reconstruction of the route of the walls is only hypothetical, as there are no obvious archaeological remains.

It has been hypothesized that they ascended along the ridge of the monumental hill, included the peak on which a temple stood, then descended downstream from the shoulder of the pons marmoreum, rejoining the riverbank. To provide access to the city two gates opened upstream and downstream of the two bridges, respectively.

=== Roman-Germanic Walls ===
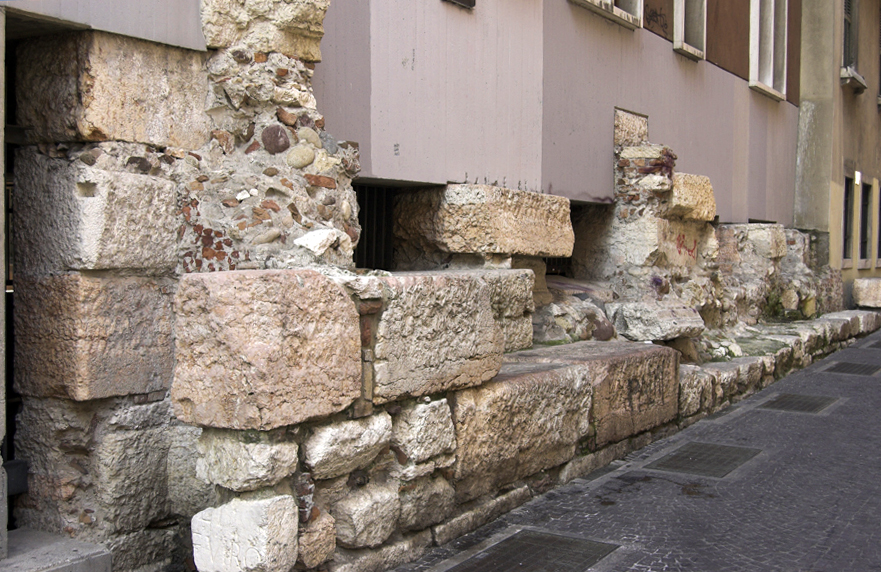
Remains of the Theodoric walls in Vicolo del Guasto

The plugging and final closure of the posterns and pedestrian gates on either side of the defensive towers dates back to later Gallienian times. Theodoric the Great was responsible for the building of a new curtain wall that traced the course of the previous defense. This remained about ten meters further inland and continued to maintain its military function, making a system with the new Theodoric walls, which were almost twice as high as the Roman ones, no less than 13.65 meters.

In front of the two city gates the new curtain wall was interrupted by two ravelins of square plan and masonry nearly 2 meters thick. These two avant-corps had a single fornix, unlike the older gates, so the opening was in axis with the central pillars of Porta Borsari and Porta Leoni.

These walls, like those of Gallienus, were also built with the extensive use of spoil material: the discovery within them of a block bearing a table carved with the number LXIII belonging to the amphitheater indicates that the outer ring of it was destroyed precisely during the construction of this curtain wall. Its partial demolition was made necessary both for the purpose of recovering building material and in order to decrease the height of the building, which was still considered too dangerous in case of attack. The building retained the functionality of the cavea since the reduction in height of about 12 meters caused the loss of only the upper gallery and not the steps.

Most likely, the city wall erected in the imperial age on the slopes of St. Peter's Hill was strengthened or rebuilt, because of its eminent and strategic position, so much so that it was on the left side of the Adige that the king had his residence built, perhaps renovating the structures of the Roman odeon.

=== Conservation status ===
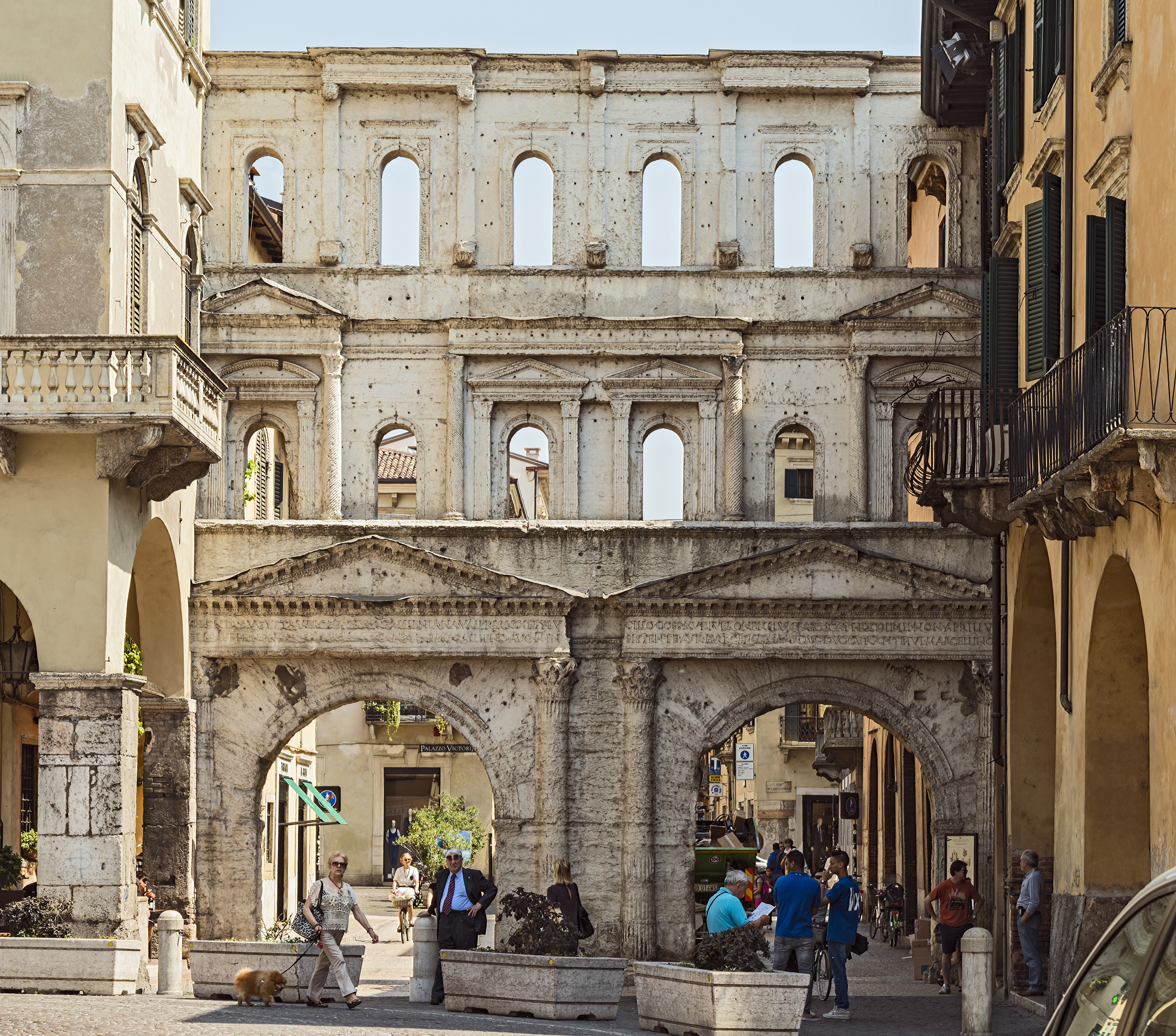
The front ad agro of Porta Iovia, now called Porta Borsari

Of the curtain walls that encircled the built-up area of Roman Verona few visible traces remain, although their layout is still very evident today as the historic fabric grew and developed by leaning against and reusing surviving portions of the walls. Of the late republican walls, in particular, only two sections of brick wall have been found, discovered between the Adige and Porta Borsari and in Via Leoncino, while more conspicuous remains of the imperial walls have been preserved, mainly in Piazza Mura di Gallieno. Of the curtain wall erected by Theodoric, conspicuous ruins remain visible in Via Diaz, in the alleys San Matteo and del Guasto, and in Via San Cosimo, Via Leoncino and Via Amanti.

Of the gates that opened along the city wall there remain the southeastern one, known as Porta Leoni, which has come down to the present day with the essential elements of its development both in plan and elevation, and the southwestern one, known as Porta Borsari, in Roman times known by the name of Porta Iovia, of which the stone front facing the countryside remains in excellent condition.

From the study of the gates, it is easy to guess that a program of monumentalization targeted both of the two main city gates, to which the facades were renewed with the addition of stone elevations leaning against the brick structures. Particularly in Porta Leoni the left half elevation of the imperial stone gate remains on the city side and, slightly concealed from view and set back less than a meter, the republican gate can be glimpsed, mainly built of brick, except for the fornixes and decorative parts for which soft tuff from the Veronese hills was used.

The archaeological excavation of one of the two imposing 16-sided and more than 7-meter-diameter towers that enclosed the gate ad agro has been left open. Of the Iovia gate, the front facing the city has disappeared and only the one facing the countryside of the imperial age is preserved, in which an exuberant ornamental richness and a very marked coloristic style emerge, emphasizing the function of representation and entrance to the city from the important Via Postumia.

== See also ==
- Verona
- Verona defensive system
- Gallienus
- Theodoric the Great
- Porta Borsari
- Porta Leoni

== Bibliography ==
- Arzone, Antonella; Napione, Ettore, eds. (2012). L'iconografia rateriana: la più antica veduta di Verona (PDF). Verona: Comune di Verona. ISBN 978-88-905618-1-8. Archived from the original (PDF) on March 22, 2019.
- Bolla, Margherita (2014). Verona romana. Sommacampagna: Cierre. ISBN 978-88-8314-771-5.
- Buchi, Ezio; Cavalieri Manasse, Giuliana (1987). Il Veneto nell'età romana: Note di urbanistica e di archeologia del territorio. Vol. II. Verona: Banca Popolare di Verona.
- Cavalieri Manasse, Giuliana; Hudson, Peter John (1999). "Nuovi dati sulle fortificazioni di Verona (III-XI secolo)" (PDF). Le Fortificazioni del Garda e I Sistemi di Difesa dell'Italia Settentrionale Tra Tardo Antico e Alto Medioevo. Mantova: S.A.P.: 71–91. Archived from the original (PDF) on June 30, 2020.
- Conforti Calcagni, Annamaria (2005). Le mura di Verona. Sommacampagna: Cierre. ISBN 88-8314-008-7.
- Puppi, Lionello (1978). Ritratto di Verona: Lineamenti di una storia urbanistica. Verona: Banca Popolare di Verona.
