= Porta Nuova, Verona =

Place in Verona, Italy

Porta Nuova
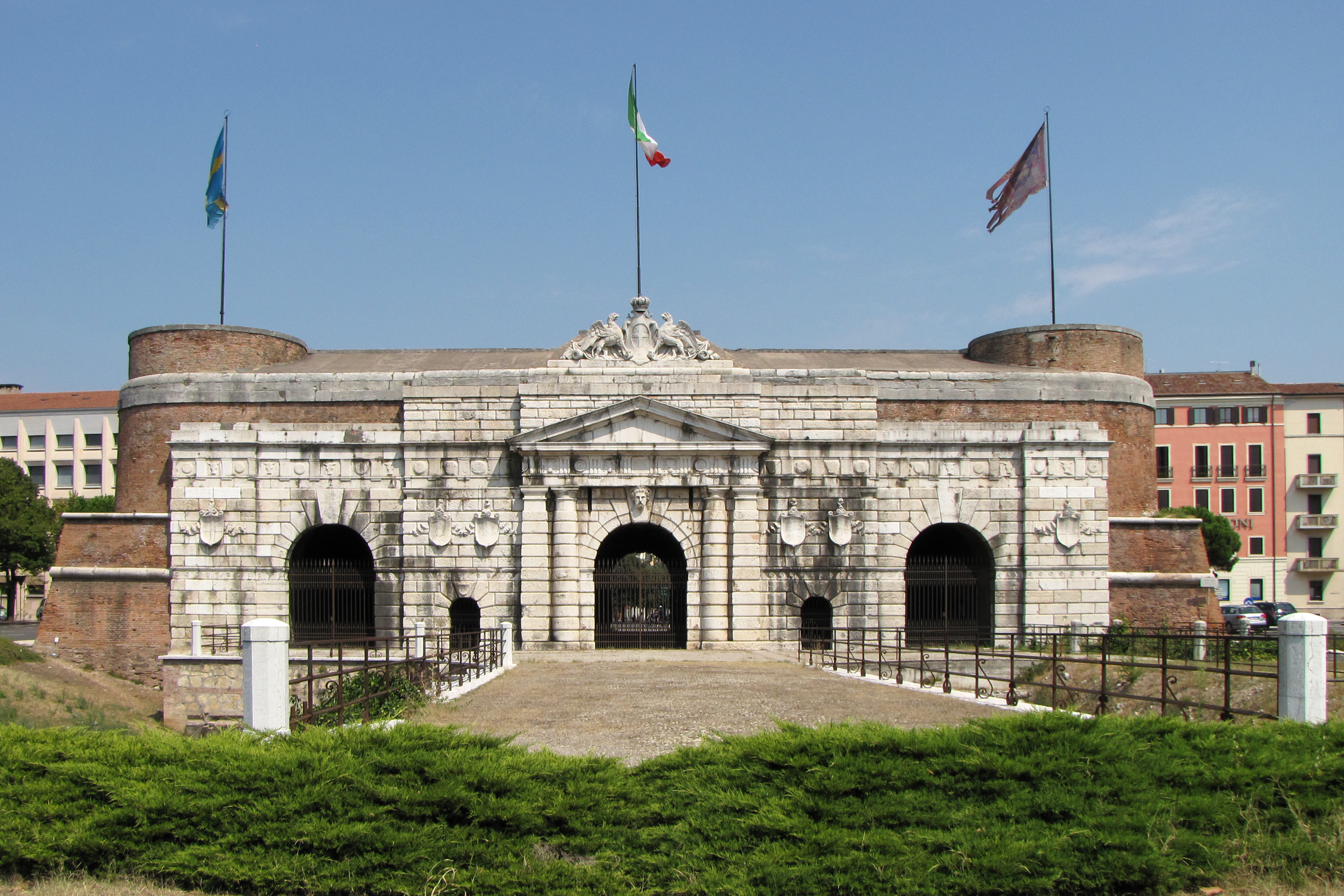
- Interactive map of Porta Nuova
- Location: Verona, Italy
- Coordinates: 45°25′53.28″N 10°59′17.43″E
- Founded: 1532–1540
- Architect: Michele Sanmicheli

Porta Nuova is a gateway to the historic center of Verona, built between 1532 and 1540. It was designed by architect Michele Sanmicheli. Giorgio Vasari remarked on the gateway in his work Le vite de' più eccellenti pittori, scultori e architettori, stating that "never before [had there been] any other work of more grandeur or better design."

== History ==
=== Beginnings ===
Two resolutions of the Venetian Senate, the first dated 15 December 1530, the second on 5 January 1531, mandated the demolition of the long side of the wall that separated the Visconti Citadel from the rest of Verona, "for the convenience and ornament of our city." Concurrently, it was decided to renovate the countryside wall, which had suffered significant damage during the War of the League of Cambrai in 1516. This project was expected to include the replacement of the medieval gate that stood near the future site of Porta Nuova.

Michele Sanmicheli was appointed as the engineer in charge of the fortifications of Verona ("inzener sopra le fabriche"), with the appointment occurring in October 1530 but becoming effective in May 1531. Following this, work on the military structures progressed more rapidly. Sanmicheli's first intervention was the design of the bastion of the Holy Trinity, which began in the year after his appointment. This was followed by work on the bastions of Riformati, San Bernardino, San Zeno, Spagna, and San Francesco, along with a series of intermediate artillery emplacements, including that of the cavalier of San Giuseppe. His efforts also led to the creation of three city gates: Porta Nuova, was completed in 1532, followed by Porta San Zeno in 1541 and Porta Palio in 1547.

=== Urban framework ===
Porta Nuova, situated between the bastion of the Holy Trinity and the bastion of Riformati, was constructed alongside the realignment of the city walls between these two bastions and the dismantling of the wall that separated the fortified Citadel from the rest of the city. In this context, Sanmicheli had the opportunity to refine a new urban planning approach for this significant portion of the Venetian city, establishing Porta Nuova as a focal point. Unlike earlier gates, it provided access to a long straight street (the street of Porta Nuova, built in 1535) that led directly to the gates of Bra and the Arena, near which Sanmicheli later constructed the Honorij Palace.

This project aimed for urban renewal, a significant objective alongside military considerations. The architect aimed to harness the dynamic growth of the urban environment toward the south. From a military perspective, he viewed Porta Nuova as a critical component of Verona's southern city wall, designing the two flanking bastions—the Holy Trinity and the Riformati—accordingly. From a civil perspective, the construction sought to enhance the Arena and revive the Roman urbanistic plan characterized by orderly, rectilinear axes, in contrast to the chaotic urbanism of the medieval period. This scheme symbolically aimed to rediscover the city's Roman roots while promoting trade between the countryside and the area of Piazza Bra.

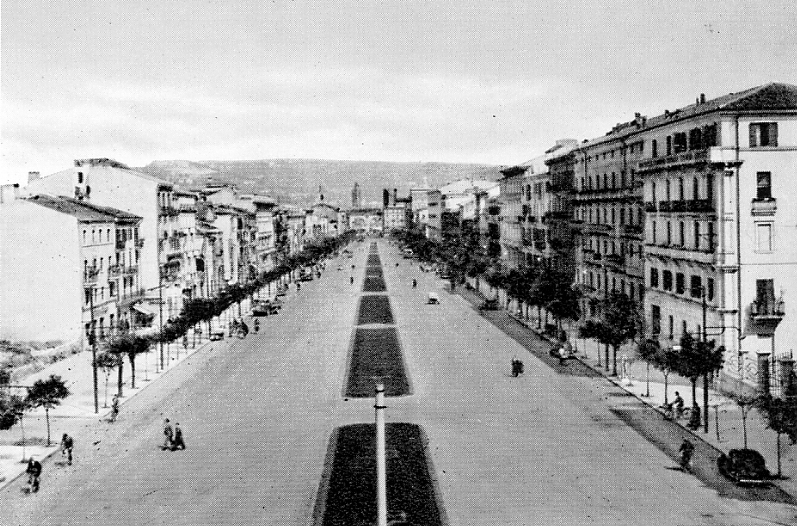
The straight line of Porta Nuova Street (later "Corso Porta Nuova"), which leads to the gates of Bra and the heart of the city

=== Construction ===
Construction of Porta Nuova began in 1532, focusing initially on the elevation toward the countryside, under the jurisdiction of Podestà Giovanni Dolfin and Captain Leonardo Giustinian, whose coats of arms are still visible on the façade, as recorded in 1571 by the report of captain Lorenzo Donato. An inscription, which has disappeared, located above the attic, mentioned by Scipione Maffei in 1732 and by Francesco Ronzani in 1831, was dated 1533. By 1535, the elevation toward the countryside and the interior of the building were nearly completed, with only the installation of the Lion of Saint Mark, which was described as "very large and difficult to move", remaining to be done, according to a report dated 16 March that year.

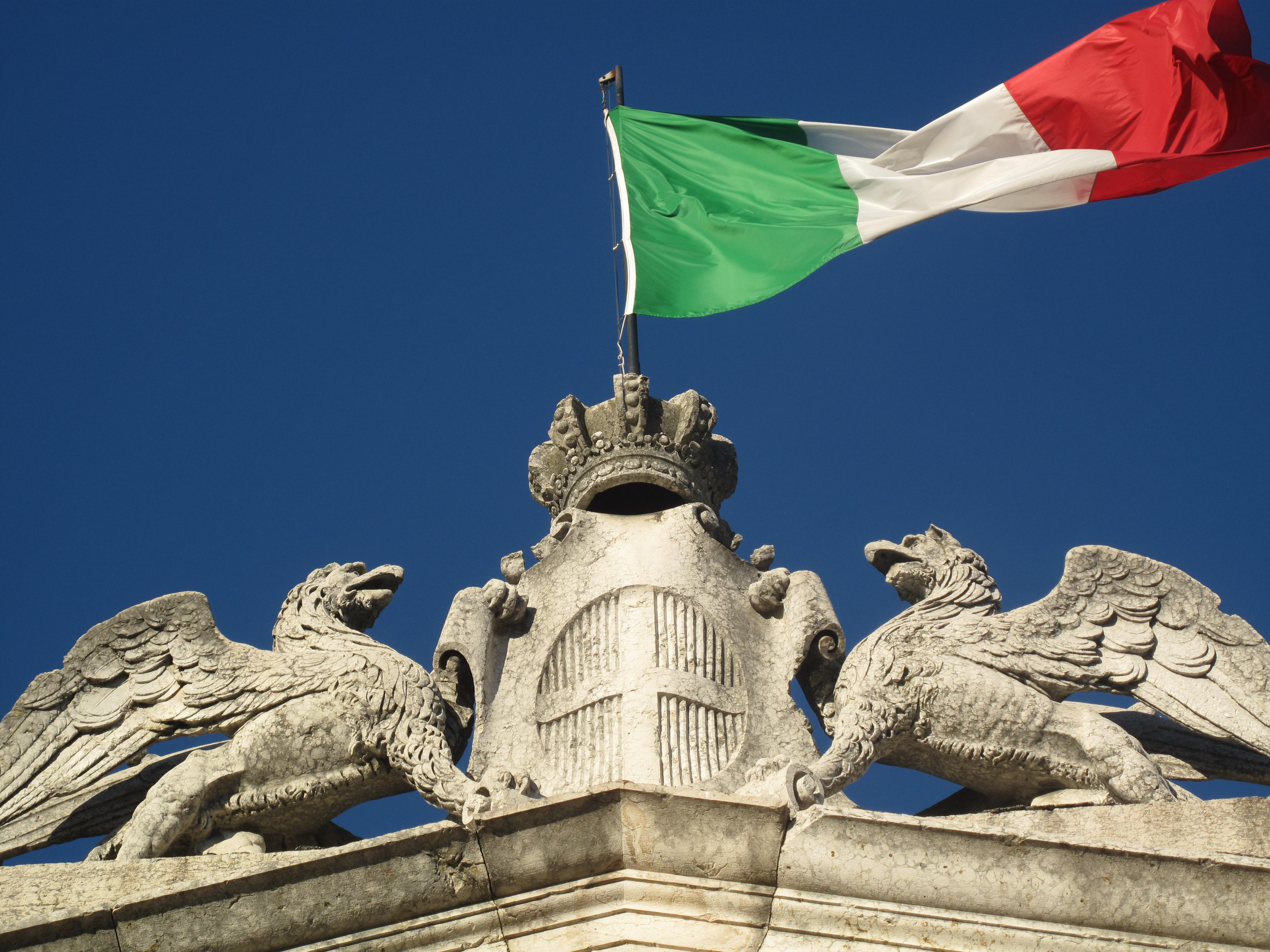
The sculpted group placed above Porta Nuova, facing south. Until 1801 a Lion of Saint Mark stood in its place

Work on the façade facing Verona commenced in 1535, as evidenced by another inscription that is now unreadable due to abrasion. This inscription bore the name of the architect and was mentioned again by Maffei and Ronzani. The Podestà Cristoforo Morosini and Captain Giacomo Marcello, whose coats of arms are still visible on the façade, reported the completion of the building site around 1540. The year 1540 is also confirmed by an inscription on the central tympanum of the elevation facing the city. In the same year, when the elevation toward the city was nearly completed, the official opening of the gate took place, which a report dated 26 July that year sets at 1 August.

However, the gate roofing remained provisional for many years, as evidenced by reports dated 21 July 1550 and 1564. The roof was completed around 1570, as indicated by a report from Captain Lorenzo Donato in 1571, confirming its completion.

=== Nineteenth-century transformations ===
The Lion of St. Mark was destroyed by the Jacobins in 1801 and later replaced by a sculpted group with a coat of arms bearing the double-headed imperial eagle in the center, later abraded, and topped by a crown.

The current appearance of the monument, while retaining some similarities to Sanmicheli's original design, has undergone significant alterations due to interventions throughout the 19th century during the Austrian occupation, particularly on the countryside façade. In 1852, two large lateral arches were added to this façade, disrupting the rhythm between the central portal and the two smaller lateral openings. Additionally, a connecting corridor was created from the smaller light on the right to the interior rooms, and the two rectangular openings flanking the pediment on the city-facing side were closed. This intervention, which made a new addition to the original monument while remaining faithful to its design and construction technique, can be identified because of the "decidedly lower level" of the ashlar lining.

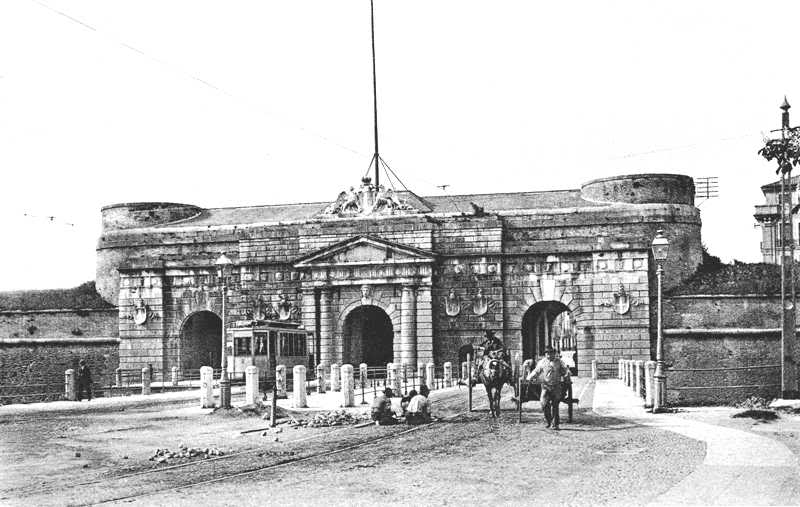
The gate at the beginning of the 20th century: one can see the two side arches, which were opened during the 19th-century Habsburg transformations, and the tramway line that led from the railway station to the city center

To accommodate increasing civilian traffic, the right-hand arch (from the exterior perspective) was opened in 1854, followed by the left-hand arch in 1900. These renovations involved some demolition of the 16th-century structure. In the interior façade, the new openings replaced the windows of the side rooms, originally intended for the guardhouse, although the left room still retains a large fireplace. During this same period, the double flight of internal stairs leading to the roof and artillery emplacements was demolished.

The area in front of the gate experienced significant transformations in the second half of the 19th century, particularly due to the expansion of the Verona Porta Nuova station. As the terminus of the city's tramway network, in operation between 1884 and 1951, the station required the passage of the line under the gate's arches to connect with the city center. Beginning in 1866, with the annexation of the Veneto region to the Kingdom of Italy, the defensive function of the magistral wall was diminished. Under Italian administration, various passages and breaches were created along the walls to facilitate traffic in and out of the city, including two openings on either side of Porta Nuova.

== Description ==
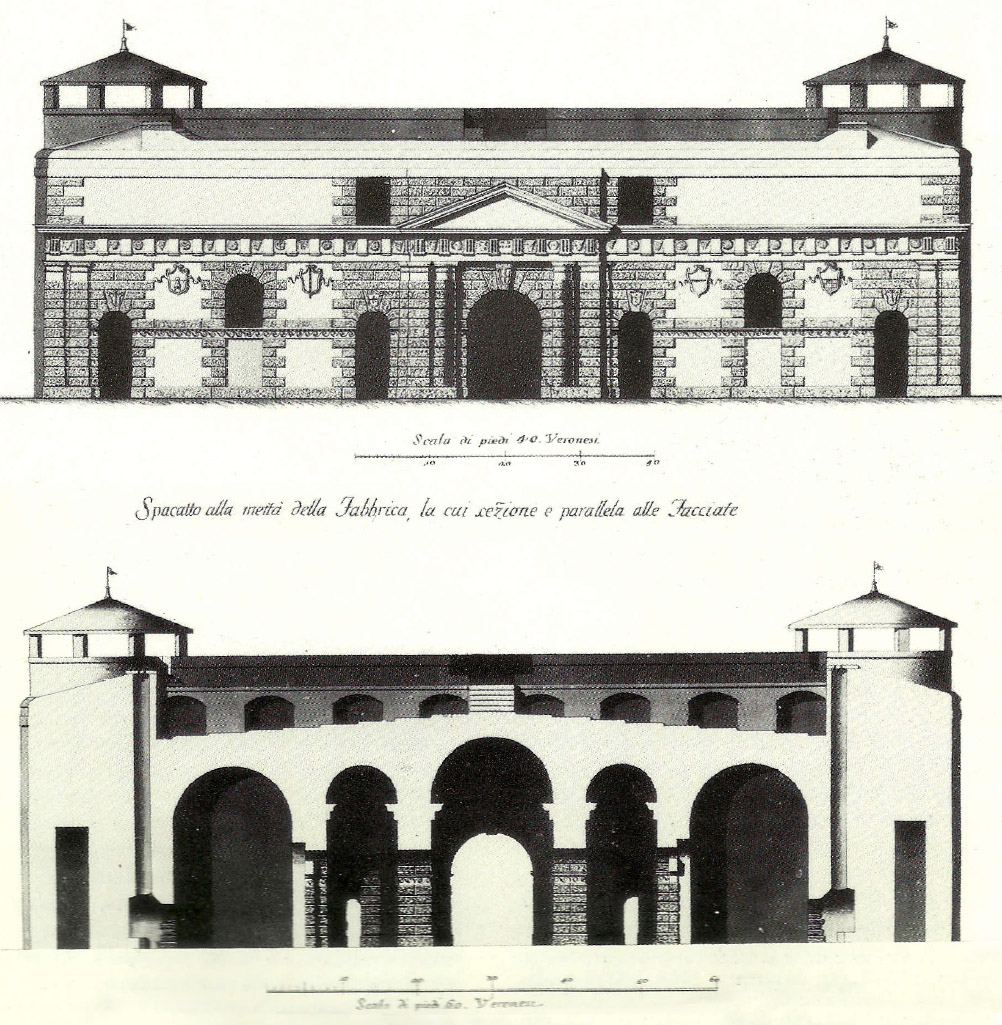
Drawing depicting a section of the gate (bottom) and the city-side elevation before the 19th-century modifications (top)

Francesco Maria I Della Rovere, Captain General, specified that the gates should be situated "in an open place and straight between two bastions", avoiding the "entangled and twisted" configuration found in Ferrara. He also requested that a cavalier suitable for the placement of artillery be positioned at the center of the curtain wall between the two bastions.

The structure of the gate appears to be an integral part of the city walls, as it does not project beyond the curtain wall. Its height is intentionally limited to reduce vulnerability to enemy artillery. The block has two circular towers on either side, used by sentries and originally covered by a wooden roof with a tiled covering, the shape of which allowed an excellent view of the surrounding area. The open top of the gate served as a platform for fortress artillery, making it, as noted by Scipione Maffei, "the first example of making a gate to be used also as a Cavalier." This necessitated the gate's considerable width for maneuvering artillery, as well as thick walls, pillars, and roof structures to support the weight and absorb vibrations from cannon fire.

The plan, rectangular in shape, is laid out as an elaborate three-lane design, defined by four large pillars with dividing Doric pilasters. The side aisles provided access to guard posts, complete with fireplaces, and to small rooms that could be used as cells. The interior is almost entirely covered by ashlar. The gate was accessible from the countryside by wooden drawbridges lowered over the fixed masonry bridge, which ran across the deep magisterial moat.

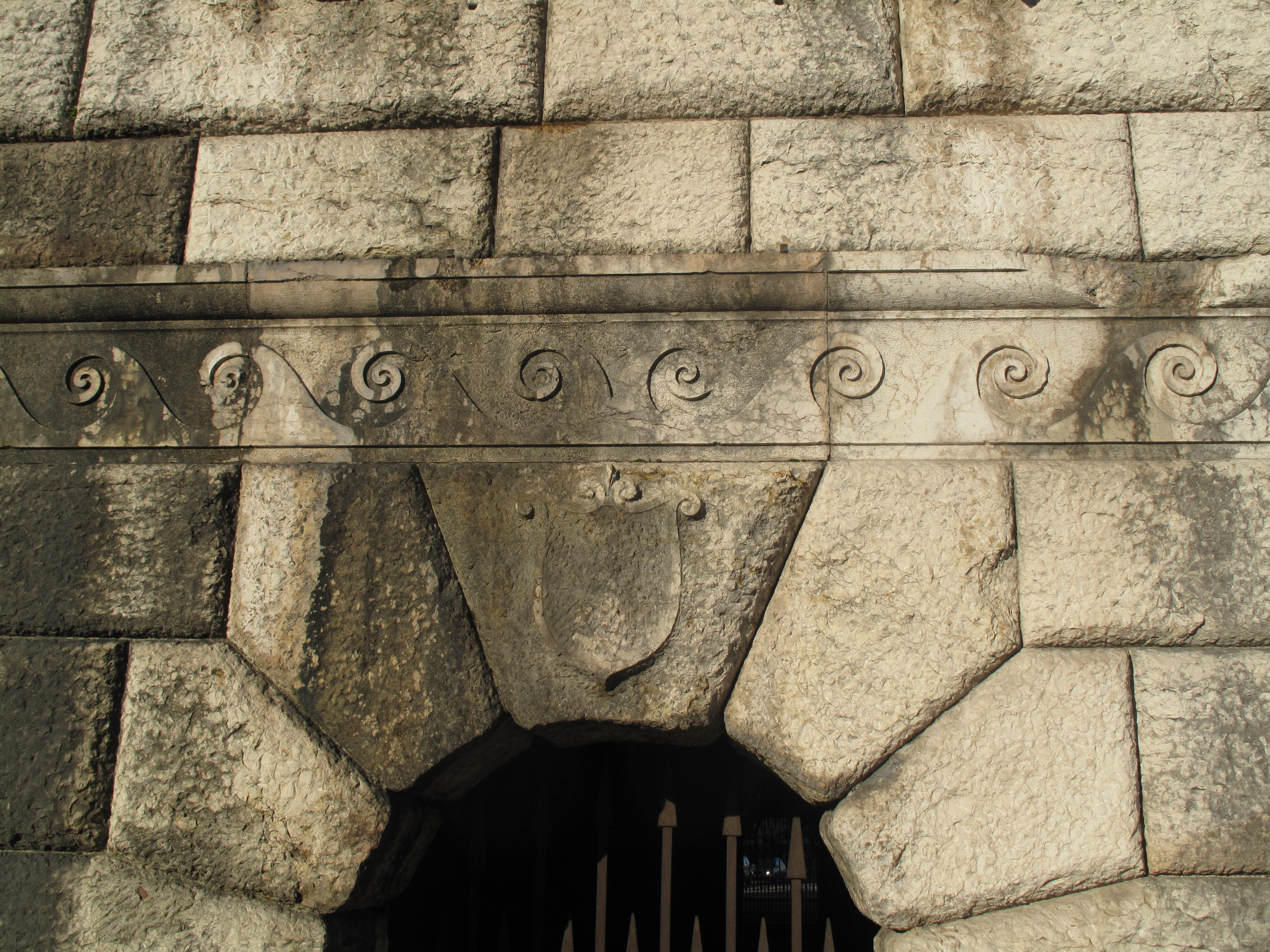
Running dog frieze on the exterior façade

The gate draws inspiration from elements of Ancient Roman architecture, particularly the antiquities of Verona. This includes references to the Arena, adopting the Doric order and ashlar stone; the Arch of Jupiter Ammon, evoked through the use of the deity's face in the keystone of the central arch, symbolizing power and strength; and the older façade of Porta Leoni, reflected in the running dog frieze. These references align with the political aims of the Venetian Republic, which sought to fortify and beautify its controlled cities by drawing on the grandeur of ancient Rome. The gate effectively served two practical functions: permitting travel between the city and the countryside, and deterring invasion.

=== Elevations ===
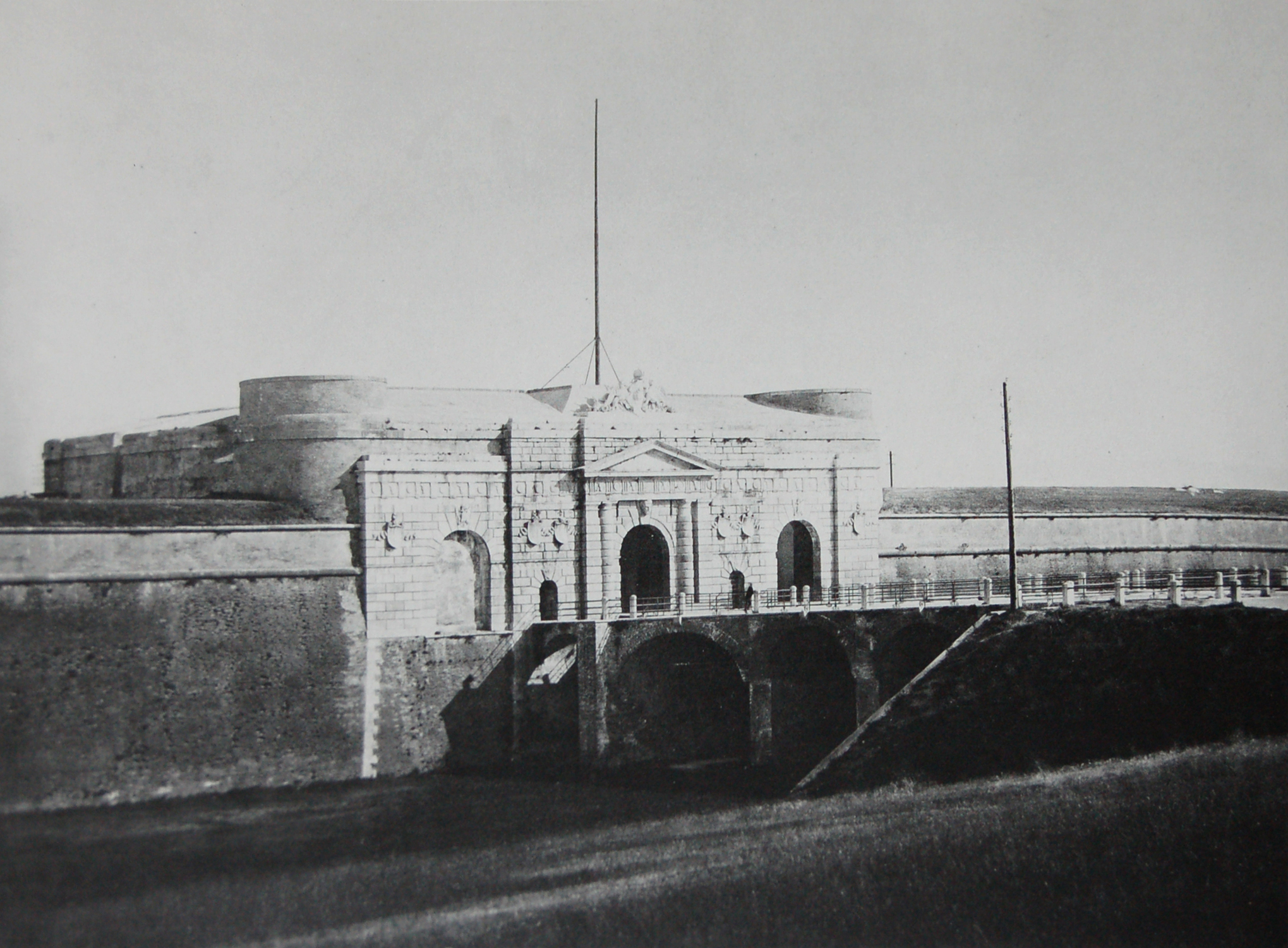
The country side of the door in a photograph taken around the 1860s by Moritz Lotze

The original elevation facing the countryside was inspired by the classical compositional scheme of the triumphal arch, though the substantial forms and complete ashlar cladding conferred a more austere appearance. The façade is divided into a central part with the main portal, in which paired half-columns and lesenes support a tympanum, and two slightly set back side parts with small portals, to which two more large side arches were added in the 19th century. The attic floor supported the Lion of St. Mark, later replaced by the sculpted group with two griffins, between which stood the coat of arms with the double-headed eagle, later abraded.

This façade had a particularly massive and stocky Doric order, lacking a base, and a facing completely covered in rough ashlar, including the half-columns and pilasters, while the frieze, containing metopes and triglyphs, appears almost rough-hewn. The simultaneous use of the Doric order and ashlar was not unprecedented, having been present in several contemporaneous buildings; it also echoed elements found in the Veronese amphitheater, which is located at the end of the new city layout. This combination of Doric order and ashlar endows the façade with a sense of indestructibility and strength, very suitable for a military architecture.

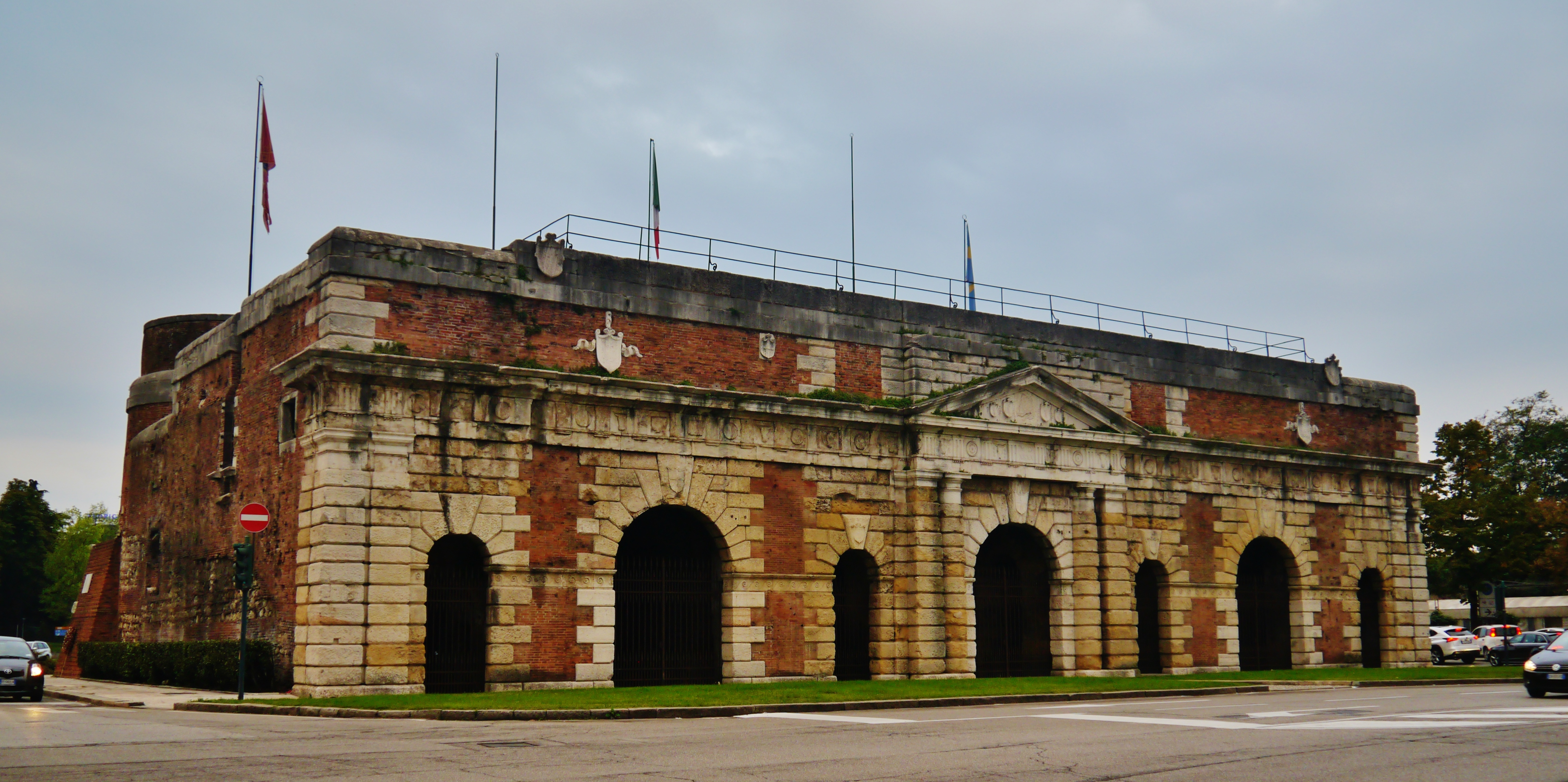
City side of the gate

The rear façade, on the city side, spans the entire length of the block: the central part faithfully reproduces its corresponding one on the front façade, while a sequence of three arched openings extends to the sides: the one closest to the end of the gateway led to the stairs; the middle one is an archway large enough to allow vehicles, with a window originally illuminating the upper floor; finally, the last opening allowed access to the interior rooms of the structure. In this elevation, stone material combined with brick was used, a choice that gives the façade a less threatening appearance; moreover, while Red Verona marble was used in the front façade, less noble tuff was used for the one in the rear.

== See also ==
- Porta Borsari – Ancient Roman gate in Verona, northern Italy
- Porta Leoni – City gate in Verona, Italy
- Verona – City in Veneto, Italy

== Bibliography ==
- Vasari, Giorgio (1568). Le vite de' più eccellenti architetti, pittori, et scultori italiani, da Cimabue insino a' tempi nostri. Edizione Giuntina. part III, volume II.
- Brugnoli, Pierpaolo; Sandrini, Arturo (1988). Architettura a Verona nell'età della Serenissima. Vol. I. Verona: Banca Popolare di Verona. OCLC 311461716.
- Concina, Ennio; Molteni, Elisabetta (2001). La fabrica della fortezza: l'architettura militare di Venezia. Verona: Banca Popolare di Verona. OCLC 49401651.
- Conforti Calcagni, Annamaria (2005). Le mura di Verona. Cierre edizioni. ISBN 88-8314-008-7.
- Davies, Paul; Hemsoll, David (2004). Michele Sanmicheli. Mondadori Electa. ISBN 88-370-2804-0.
- Puppi, Lionello (1971). Michele Sanmicheli architetto di Verona. Padova: Marsilio. OCLC 825249.
- Ronzani, Francesco; Luciolli, Gerolamo (1831). Le fabbriche civili, ecclesiastiche e militari di Michele Sanmicheli, architetto veronese. Venice: Giuseppe Antonelli.
- Stocker, Mirjam; Pierre, Elodie; Martinelli, Chiara, eds. (2013). Un parco da vivere: guida al parco delle mura e dei forti di Verona. Legambiente.
- Viviani, Giuseppe Franco, ed. (2008). Verona 1908: arriva il tram elettrico (PDF). Verona: Associazione Filatelica Numismatica Scaligera. Archived from the original (PDF) on 4 October 2012.
