= Porta Borsari, Verona =

Ancient Roman gate in Verona, northern Italy

Coordinates: 45°26′31″N 10°59′36″E

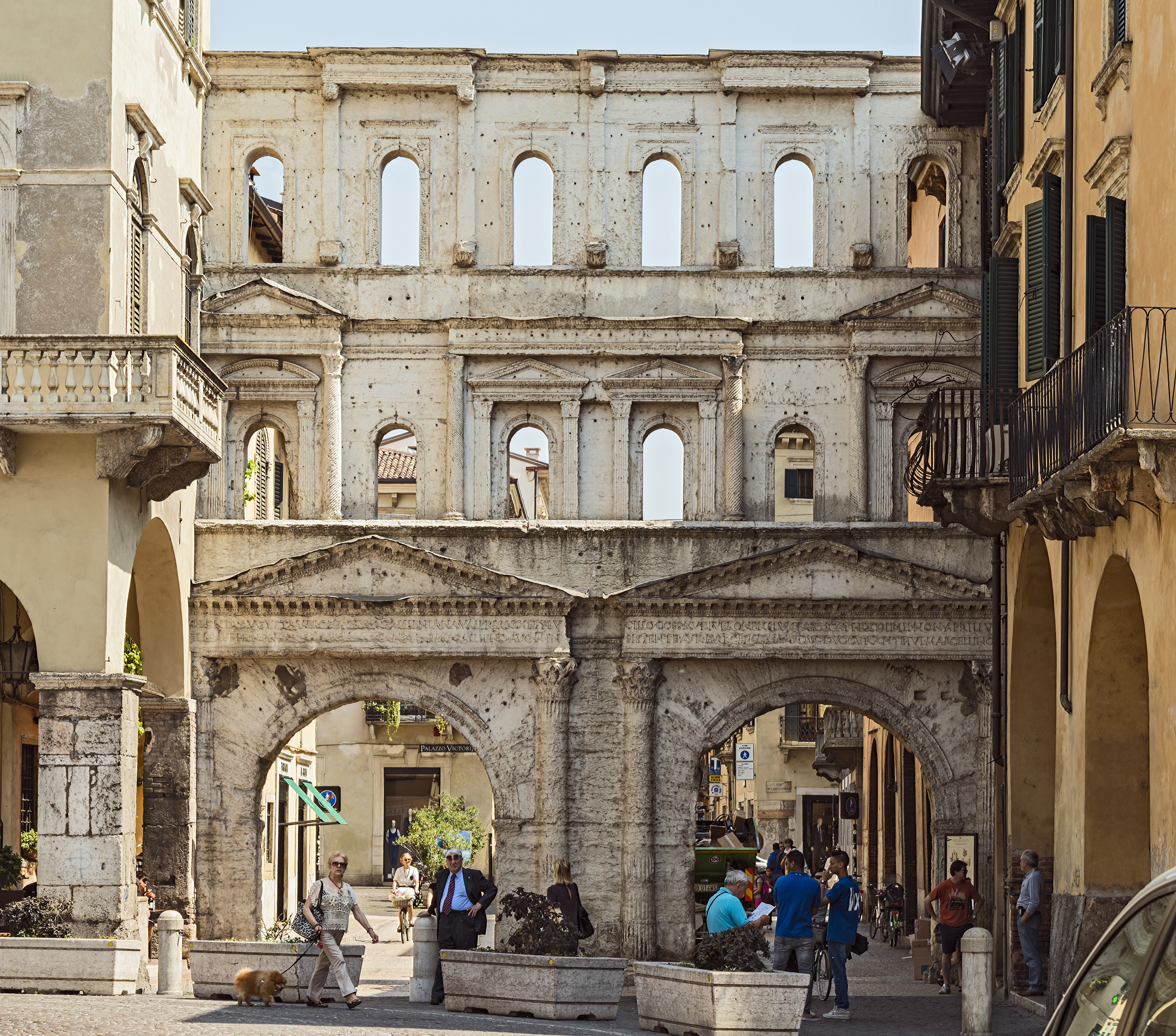
External façade

Porta Borsari is an ancient Roman gate in Verona, northern Italy.

The gate dates to the 1st century AD, though it was most likely built over a preexisting gate from the 1st century BC. An inscription from Emperor Gallienus' reign reports another reconstruction in 265 AD. The Via Postumia (became the decumanus maximus) passed through the gate, which was the city's main entrance and was richly decorated. It also originally had an inner court, which has now disappeared.

The gate's Roman name was Porta Iovia, as it was located near a small temple dedicated to Jupiter lustralis. In the Middle Ages, it was called Porta di San Zeno, while the current name derives from the guard soldiers who were paid the dazio (Latin bursarii).

The façade, in local white limestone, has two arches flanked by semi-columns with Corinthian capitals supporting an entablature and a pediment. In the upper part, a two-story wall with twelve arched windows, some of which are included in small niches with a triangular pediment.

== See also ==
- Porta Leoni
- Porta Nuova, Verona
