= Porta Leoni =

City gate in Verona, Italy

Coordinates: 45°26′26″N 10°59′59″E

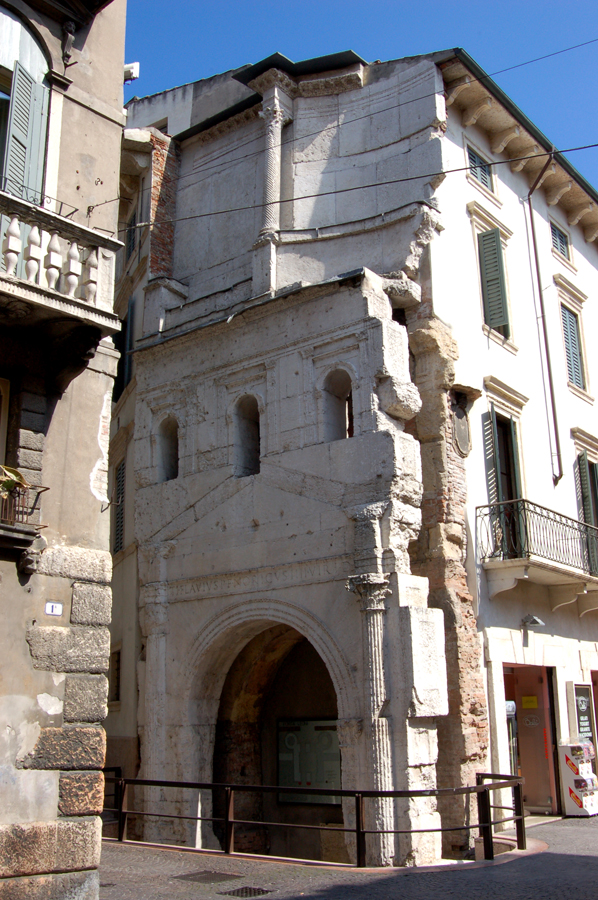
The visible façade of Porta Leoni.

Porta Leoni (Gate of the Lions) is an ancient Roman gate in Verona, northern Italy.

The gate was built during the Roman Republic by P. Valerius, Q. Caecilius, Q. Servilius and P. Cornelius, and restructured in imperial times. It was connected to the road which led to Bologna and Aquileia.

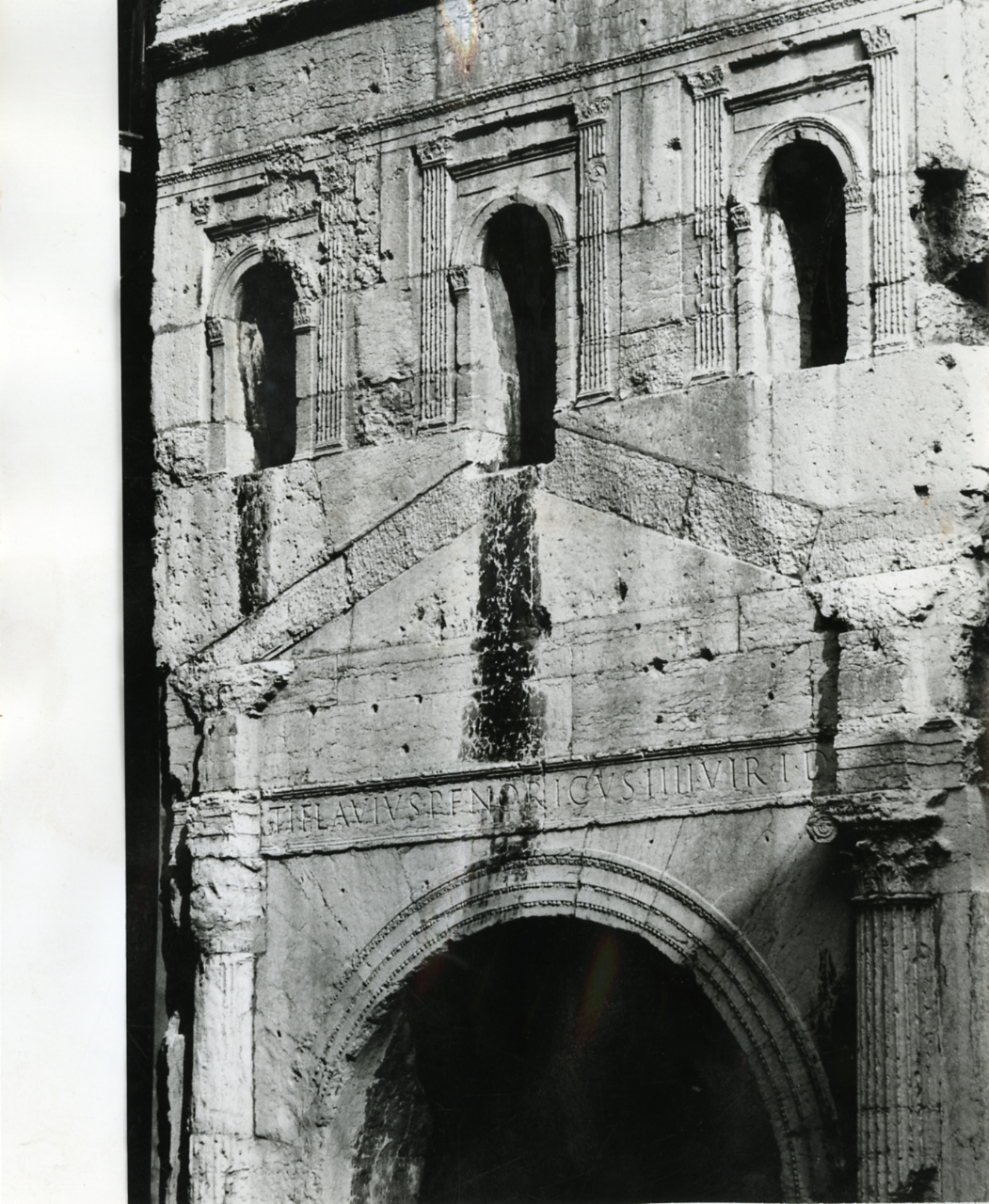
Photo by Paolo Monti (1972). Fondo Paolo Monti, BEIC.

The original Roman name is unknown. During the Middle Ages it was called Porta San Fermo, due to the nearby church, while in the Renaissance it was known as Arco di Valerio. The current name derives from a Roman tomb decorated with two lions (Italian: leoni), now moved near Ponte Navi.

The gate has a square structures, with a double façade and two towers which looked towards the countryside. Now only half of the inner façade, covered with white stone in the imperial age, and the foundings are visible. The original decorations are all lost. The lower part is similar to that of Porta Borsari (also in Verona), while the upper part has an exedra with twisted columns.

== See also ==
- Porta Borsari
- Porta Nuova, Verona
