= Verona defensive system =

Defensive system of the city of Verona, Italy

- Part of Quadrilateral fortresses
- Verona, Veneto in Italy
- Austrian Verona in 1866, with the outer entrenched camp and the magisterial wall highlighted

Site information
- Type: Permanent defensive line
- Owner: City of Verona
- Condition: In good condition

Location
- Coordinates: 45°25′53″N 10°59′08″E

Site history
- Built: 1833-1866
- Built by: Imperial Royal Office of the Fortifications of Verona

The defensive system of Verona is a military, logistical and infrastructural complex consisting of city walls, bastions, forts, entrenched camps, warehouses and barracks, built between 1814 and 1866 during Habsburg rule, which made the Venetian city, the pivot of the so-called "Quadrilatero," one of the strong points of the Empire's strategic system. Thus Austrian Verona became an army stronghold, that is, a center that could supply the entire imperial garrison present in the Kingdom of Lombardy-Venetia, consisting of approximately 100,000 soldiers.

Monumental works forming a repertoire of nearly 2,000 years of the history of fortification art are still visible in the urban area, which is why the city has been decreed a UNESCO World Heritage Site; the ruins of the Roman fortified city, the perimeter of the Scaliger walled city with its castles, the structure of the Venetian fortress, as well as the final layout of the Habsburg stronghold still remain. The magisterial wall, in its final arrangement, has a development of more than 9 km and occupies almost 100 ha of area with its structures: curtain walls, towers, allures, bastions, moats, terrepleins and glacis. Finally, in the surrounding area, located in the flat countryside or on the Torricelle hills, 31 forts (19 of which still exist) formed the last and most modern city system, which was the defense of the Habsburg stronghold.

The strengthening of the defenses was gradual, implemented in phases. From 1832 to 1842 the magisterial walls were restructured in response to the destabilization of the European political scene, which peaked in 1830 with the liberal uprisings and the July Revolution in Paris. From 1837 to 1843, hill fortifications and advanced plain forts were built, the former to prevent outflanking maneuvers to the north, the latter to solve some tactical and defensive deficiencies of the curtain wall. In 1848, the tactical importance of dominating the long natural terracing unraveling to the west of Verona highlighted by the Battle of Santa Lucia, construction of a first line of detached military forts began, which were then completed with permanent masonry works by 1856. Between 1859 and 1861, the forts of the second entrenched camp were built, at a greater distance from the city so as to render ineffective the new artilleries, which were equipped with a wider range; and finally, in 1866, this second entrenched camp was completed with two additional forts in semi-permanent style, due to the imminence of the Third Italian War of Independence.

The Austrian military buildings represent "the salient episode of art in 19th-century Verona. No other work of painting, sculpture or architecture holds a candle to the importance of the bulk and vastness of the references with the landscape and history." The Imperial Royal Office of the Fortifications of Verona proved respectful of the pre-existing communal, Scaliger and Venetian walls, integrating them into the new fortification system and renovating them according to new developments and needs in the military sphere. When confronted with the need to build new structures, on the other hand, a new approach was taken to Veronese Romanesque architecture, thus adapting the building materials, their use, as well as formal and decorative choices to the city context.

== History ==
=== Beginnings and state of the fortifications ===
The Veronese countryside in Roman times, with the main communication routes

Since its founding, the city of Verona has played a prominent role as the center of connections between east and west and north and south. In particular, its location at the mouth of the Adige Valley, the main communication route between Italy and Germany, allowed those in control of this position to be able to assert themselves in the nearby Lombard and Veneto territories. As a result of this relevance due to its peculiar geographical location and its topographical and economic characteristics, as early as the Roman era Verona became a strategic, well-fortified center, the crossroads of three consular roads: the Via Claudia Augusta, which connected the Danube with the Po, the Via Postumia and the Via Gallica, which connected Aquileia with Genoa and Turin, respectively.

Over the centuries, a conspicuous heritage of fortified structures was stratified, many of which are still preserved: of the pre-Roman period only limited evidence is preserved, but the vestiges of Roman domination are notable; of the medieval age, numerous works built in particular under the rule of the Della Scala family are preserved, attesting to how advanced Scala's military art was and what political weight the Veronese state managed to achieve, although there is also no lack of evidence of the brief domination of the Visconti; finally, the fortification works carried out during the Venetian period, when the imposing bastioned curtain wall surrounding the city was completed, were fundamental.

The city walls over the centuries

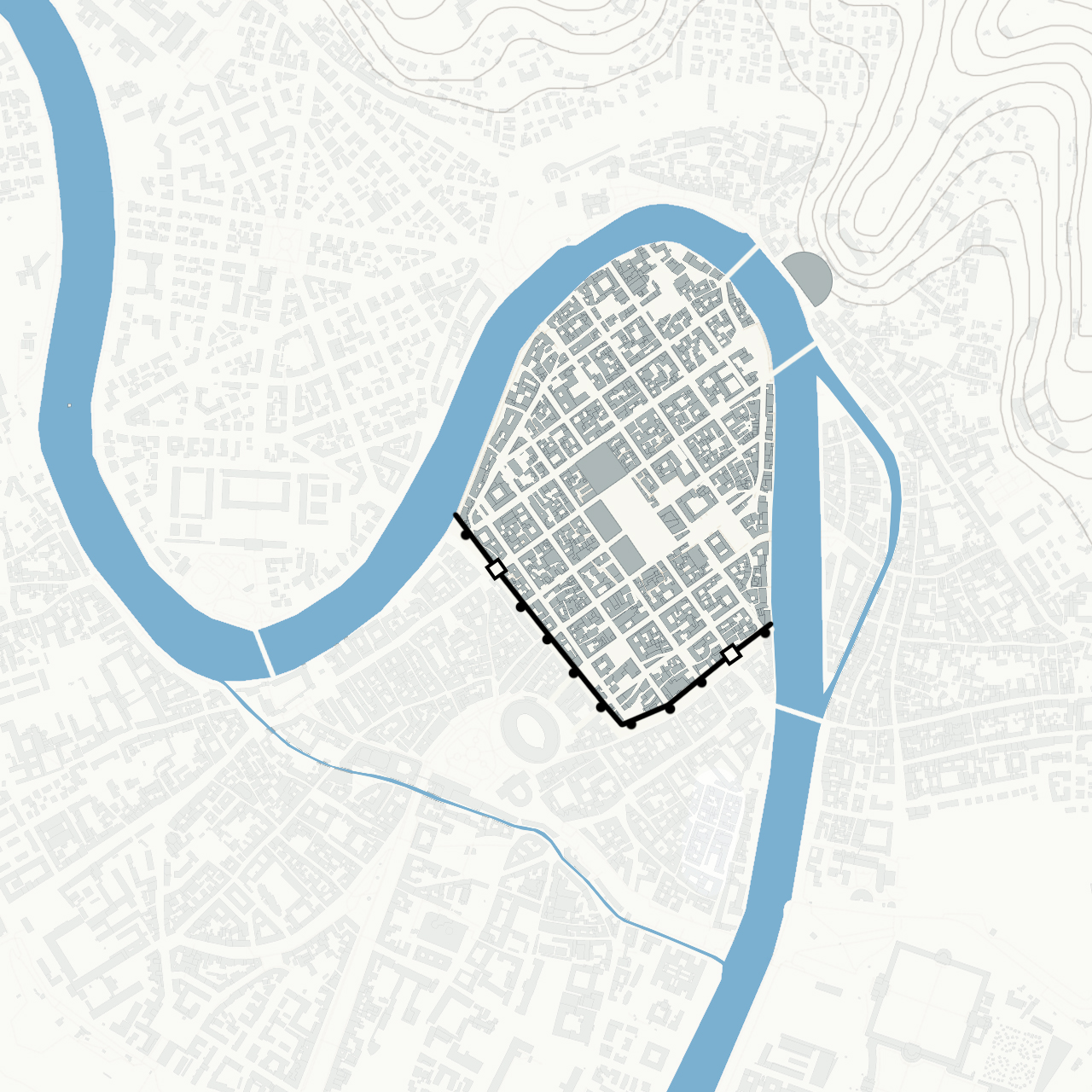
Roman Republican Period

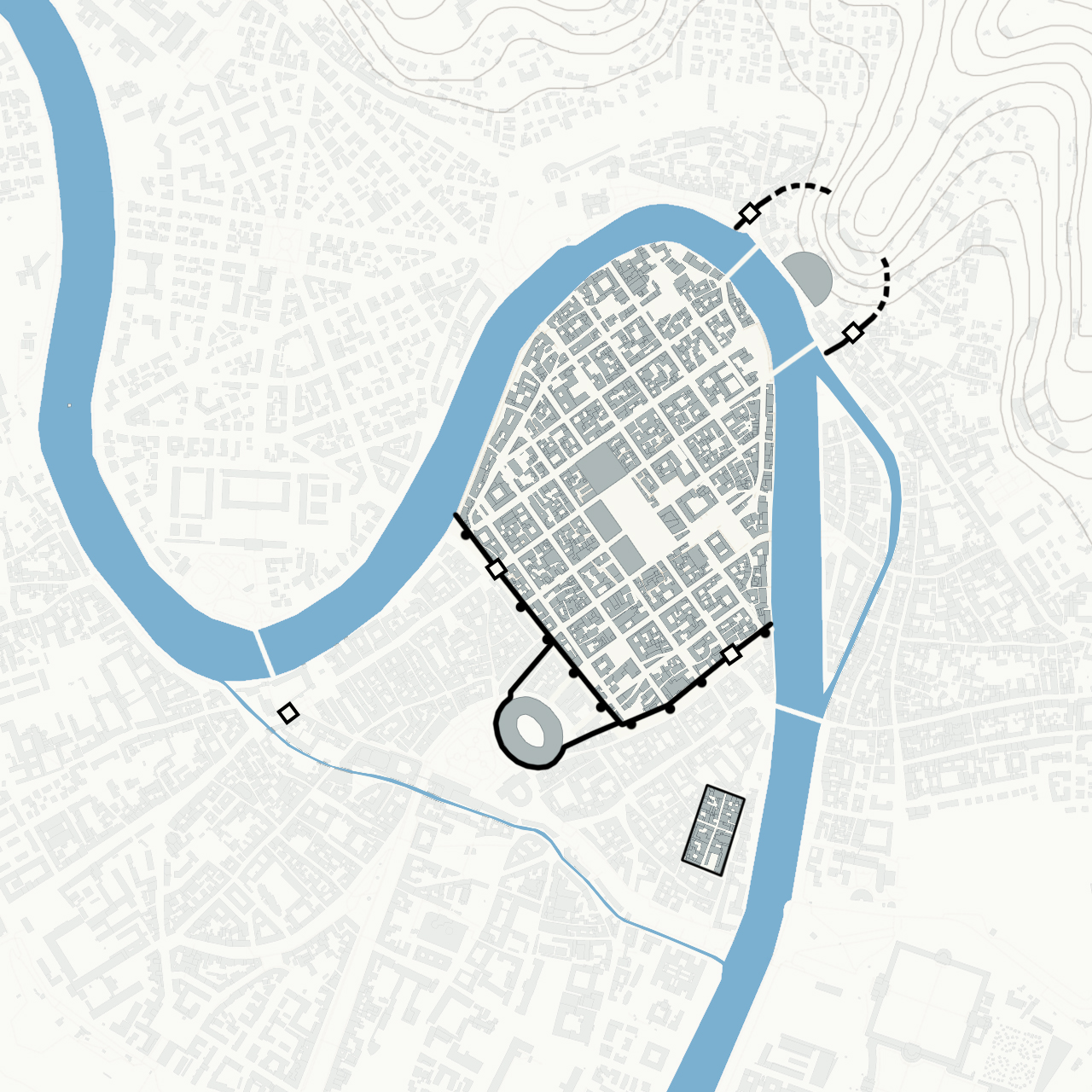
Roman imperial period

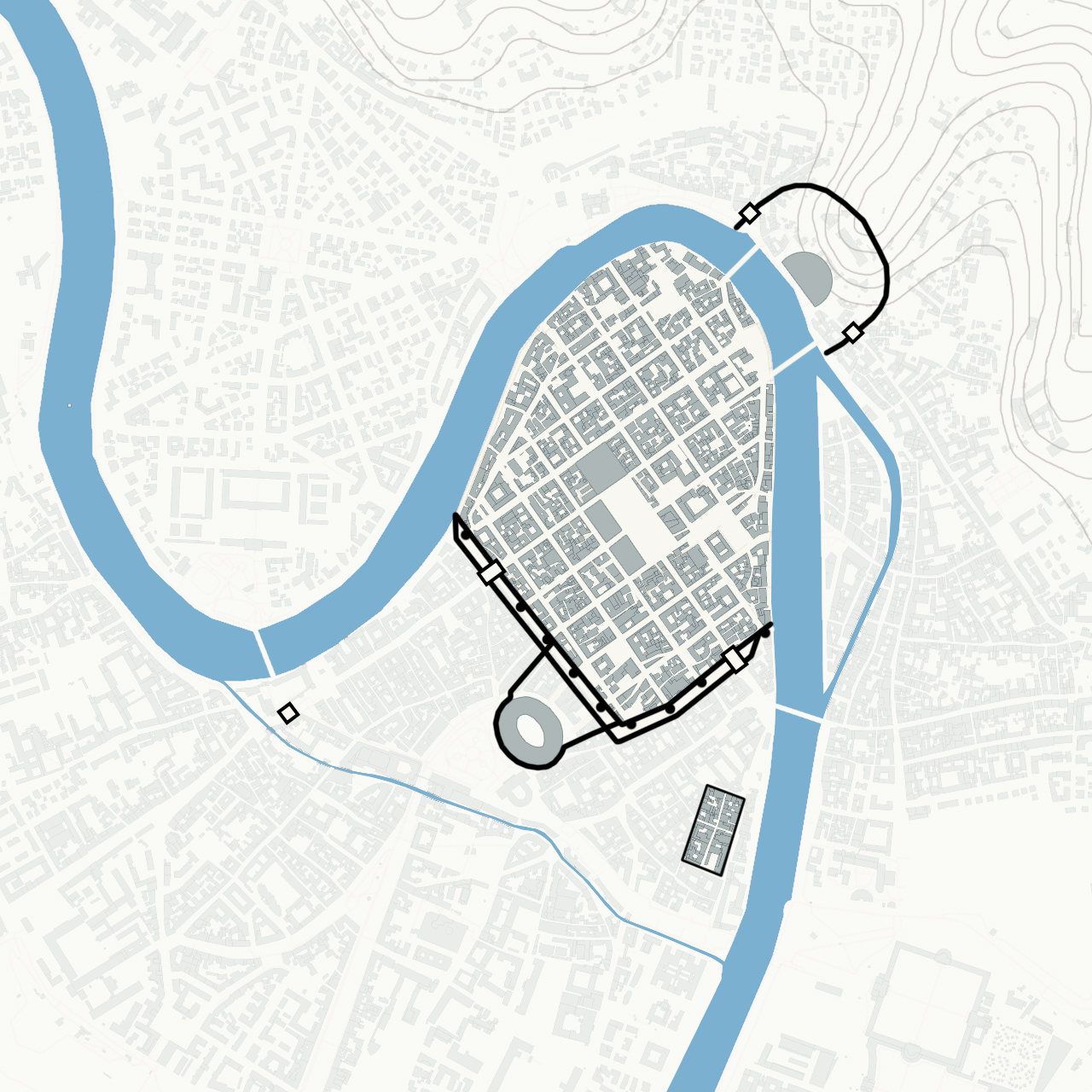
Roman-Germanic period

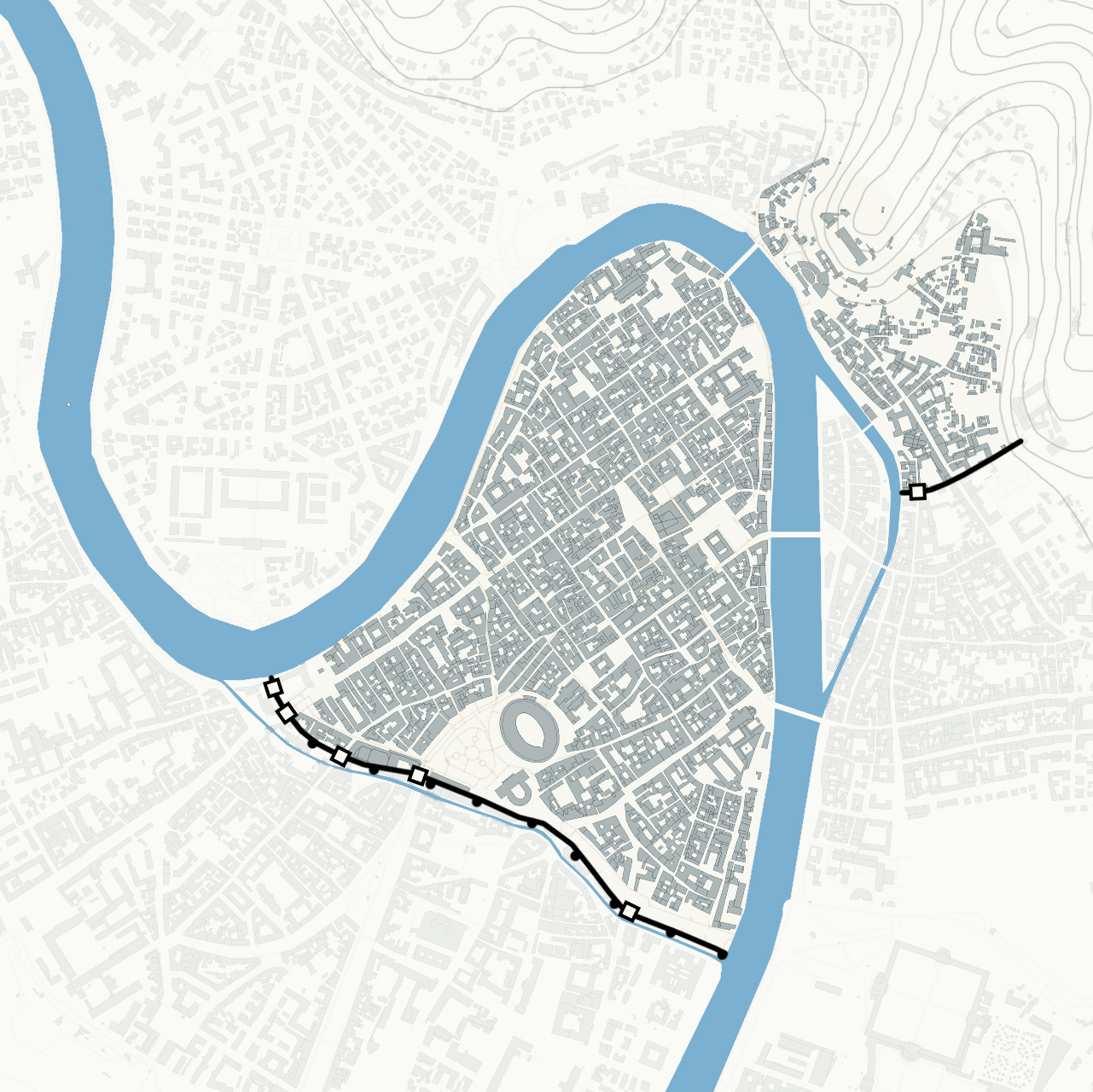
Communal period

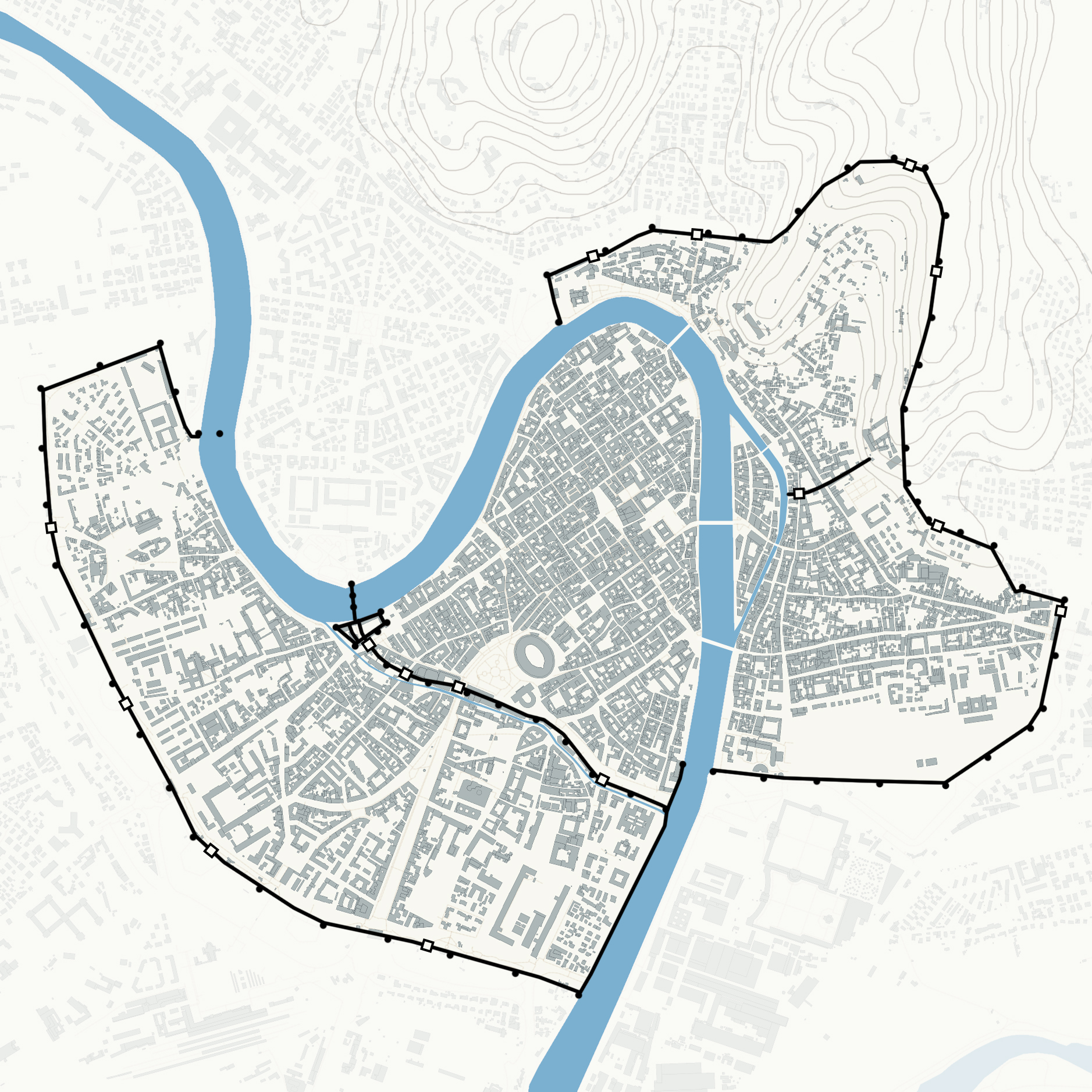
Scaliger period

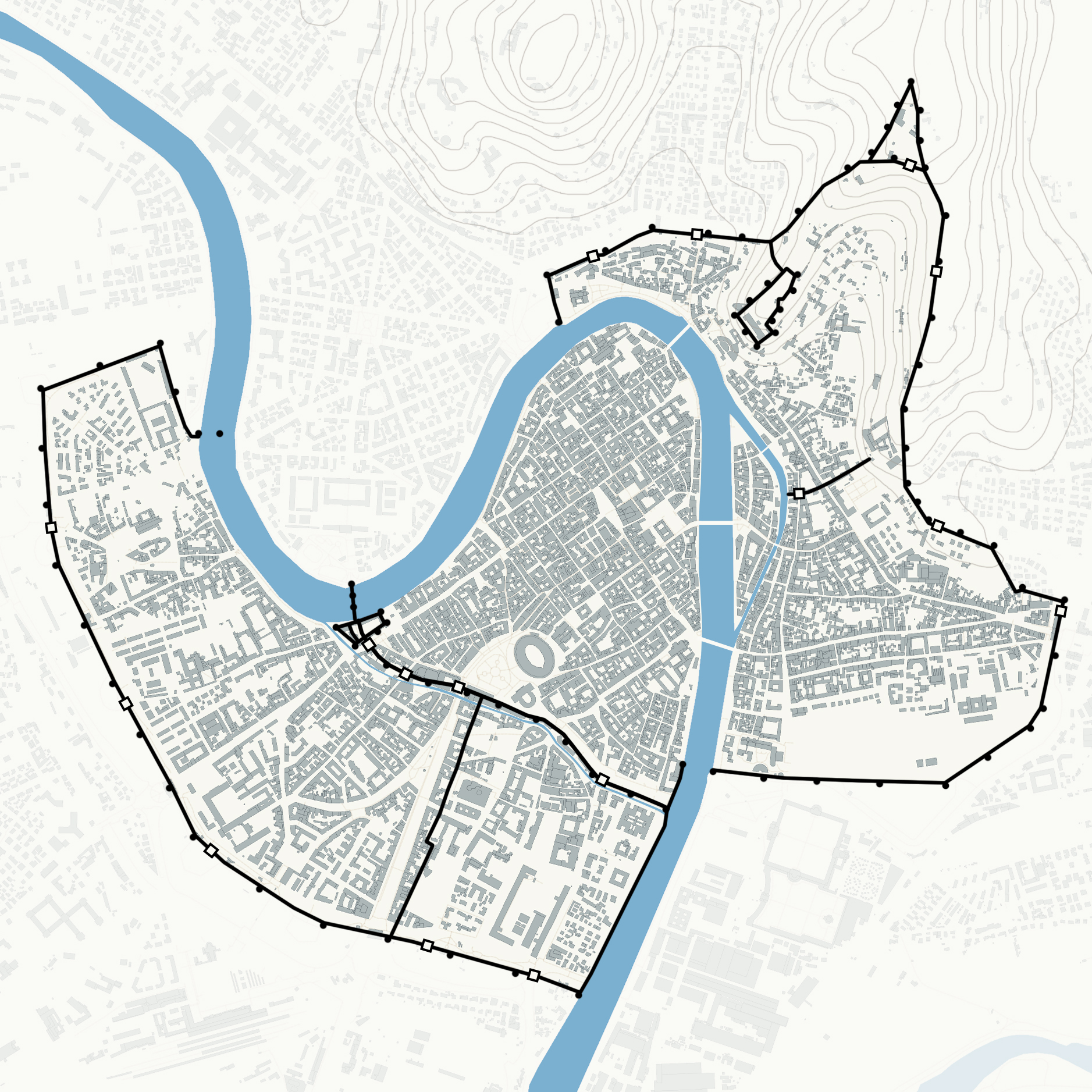
Visconti period

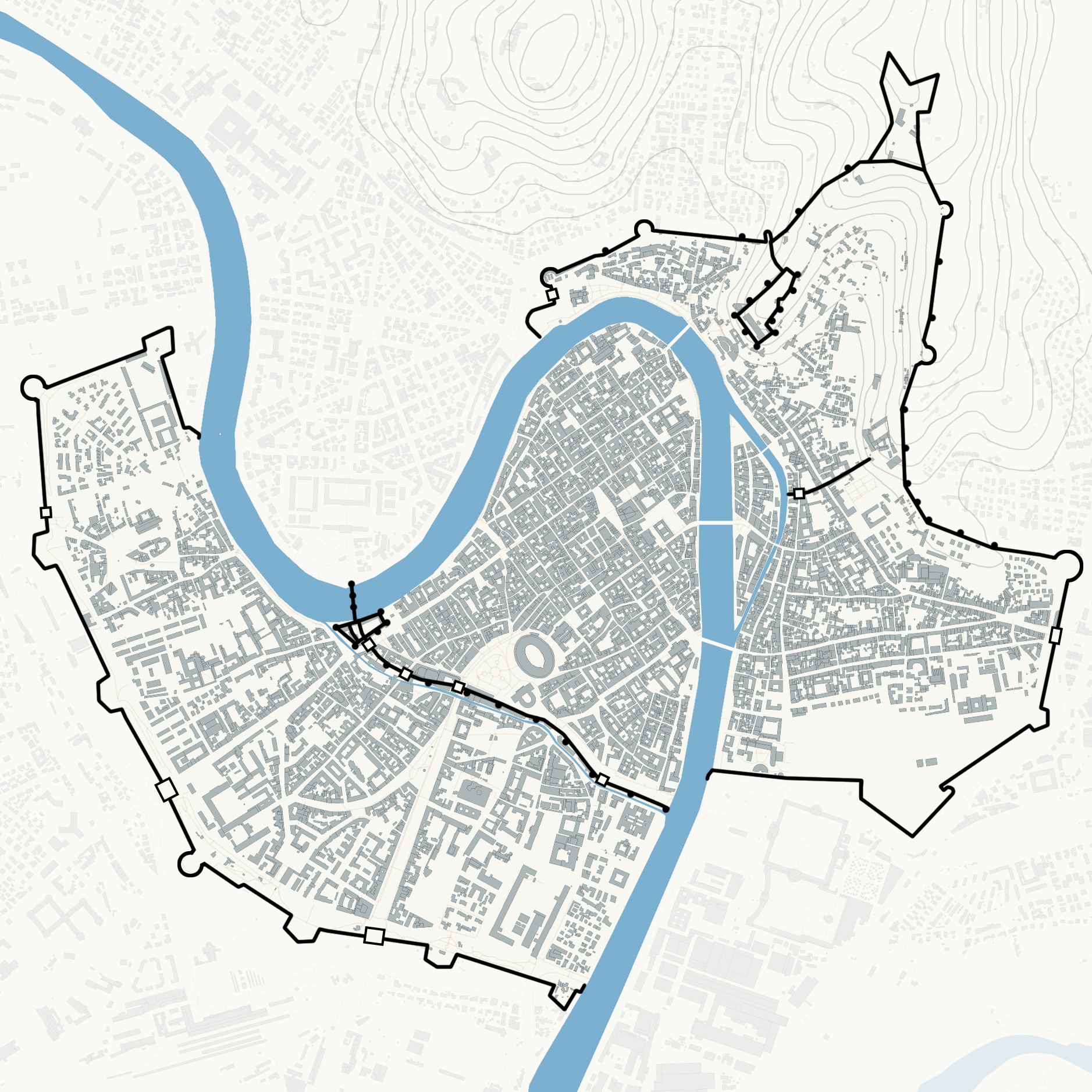
Venetian period

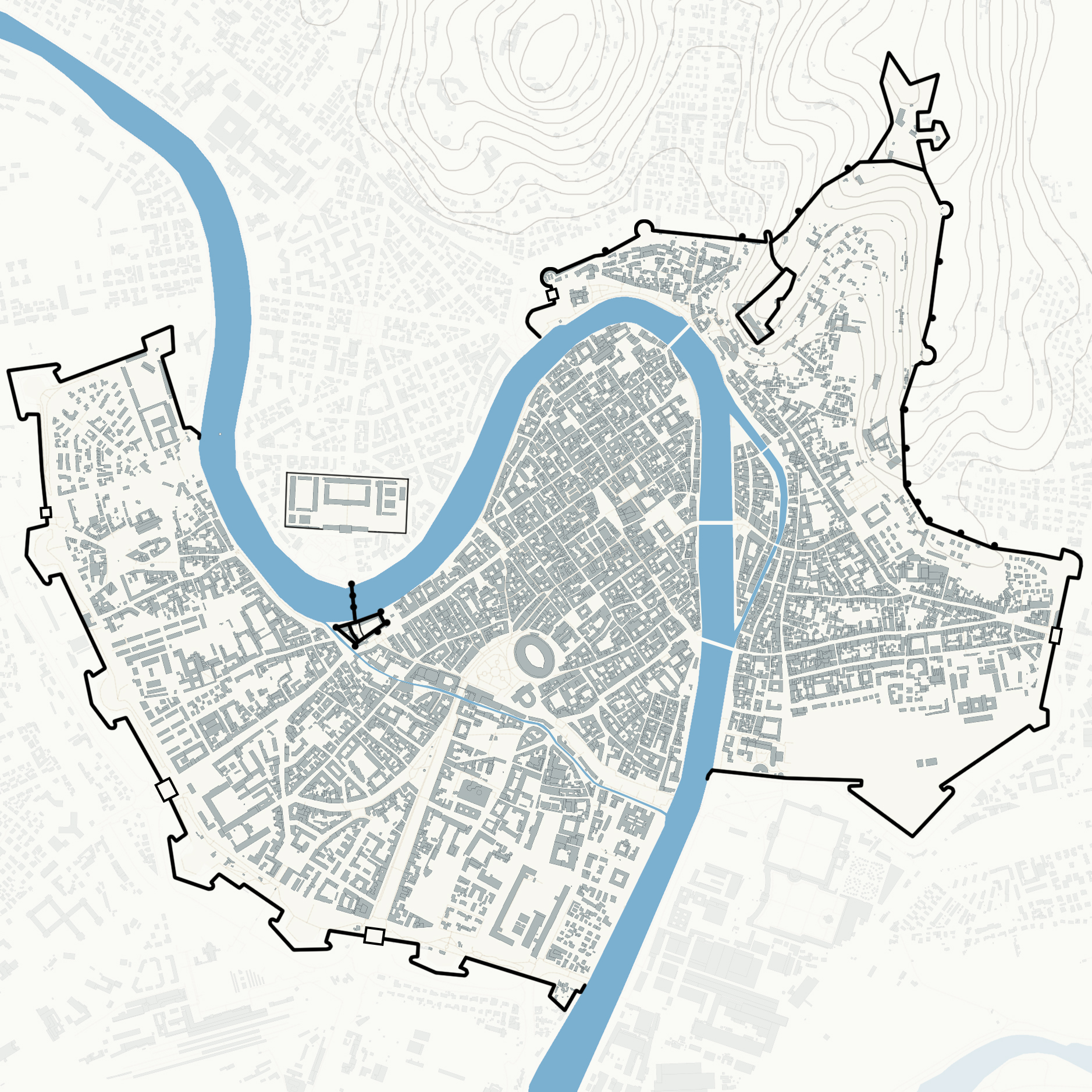
Austrian period

With the improvement of artillery, the defenses had to be made efficient again according to the new defensive criteria of modern-style fortifications. Thus, in 1530, the well-known Renaissance architect Michele Sanmicheli was called upon by the Venetian Republic and commissioned to rebuild the curtain wall to the right of the Adige River, as well as to carry out a general overhaul of the city's defensive system. His works remained essentially unchanged until the entire eighteenth century, as the Serenissima experienced a long period of peace that ended only with the arrival of Napoleon Bonaparte, who occupied Verona in 1796. The French and the Austrians contested the city and in alternating phases tried to restore the curtain wall and build temporary field works, of which no trace remains.

Following the Treaty of Lunéville (Feb. 9, 1801), the French withdrew to the right bank of the Adige while the other bank was ceded to the Austrians, resulting in a paradoxical situation whereby the city was split in two between enemies. However, before surrendering the left side, it was decided by the French to dismantle the defenses of the now lost part of the city, so the left Adige curtain was partly spoiled and castel San Pietro, castel San Felice and the country side tower of the Castelvecchio bridge were demolished. They then devoted themselves to tearing down the defenses of their part of the city, demolishing all the bastions except the bastion of San Francesco and the bastion of Spagna, the only ones that have thus survived in the forms given by Sanmicheli. The reason that prompted the Napoleonic forces to carry out these destructions was the concern that the Austrians might take possession of that part of the city by a coup d'état, establishing a dangerous bridgehead against the French armies coming from the Mincio and barring their way to Venice. Thereafter, both sides attempted to undo the damage of the reckless demolitions: in particular, the French, in late 1813, reinforced castel San Felice, Porta Vescovo, Porta San Giorgio and restored the moat of Castelvecchio, while new semi-permanent field works were prepared in the Campagnola.

In 1814 the city definitively fell to the Habsburgs: if at first the Austrians did not feel the need to strengthen the defenses, as the newly formed Holy Alliance had become the guarantor of peace in Europe, in a second phase the military assets would be restored and further strengthened, so that the city was transformed from a bastioned fortress into an entrenched camp and then into the main stronghold of the fortified region of the Quadrilatero.

=== Destabilization of the political framework and restructuring of the magisterial belt ===
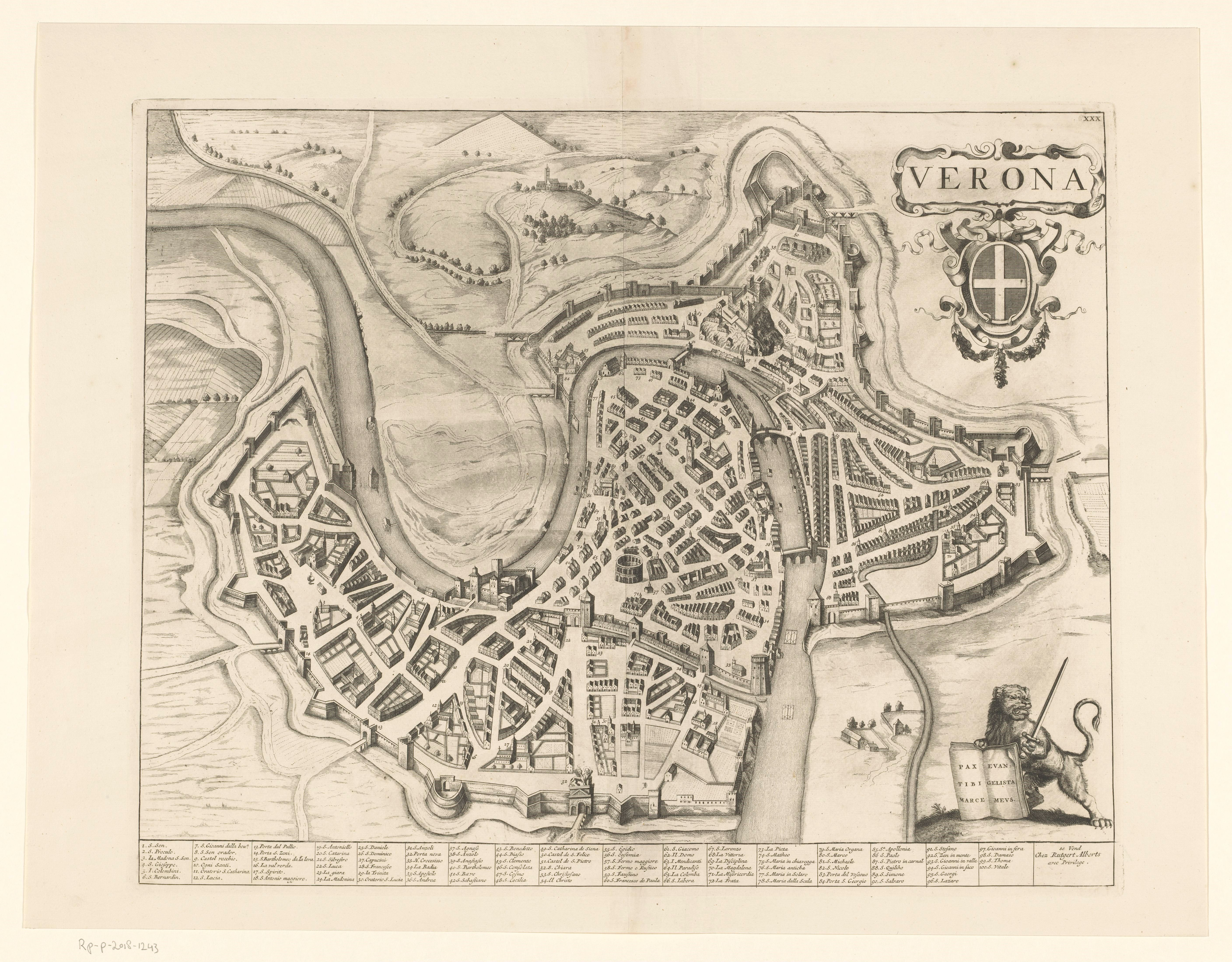
The final state of the Venetian walls of Verona as of 1724

As mentioned, during the years of the Conservative Order, following the Congress of Vienna, the European political situation appeared calm; in 1830, however, a new period of serious instability, culminating in the July Revolution in Paris and the liberal and revolutionary uprisings, made the Austrian Empire fear that a new conflict with France might originate. It became quite evident that the empire's security was directly linked to the defense of the eventual southern theater of war, which would take place in the Kingdom of Lombardy-Venetia; it was a common opinion among military experts, based on previous experiences (such as the Napoleonic wars), that the lines of the Rhine and Danube were as valuable as those of the Mincio and Adige, resulting in the need to strengthen the military garrisons in Italy.

The military leadership then decided that it would be necessary to fortify the large area between the Verona and Mantua territories (which would later be named the "Quadrilatero"). Moreover, the entire region, given its geographical location, had already undergone numerous fortification works in previous centuries, so it was possible for the imperial commands to take advantage of the already existing structures, renovating and reinforcing them where necessary, achieving considerable savings in time and money. In particular, the localities that best suited this rationale, and which they decided to strengthen, were Verona and Legnago on the Adige, Mantua and Peschiera on the Mincio, and Ceraino at the mouth of the Adige Valley; all locations no more than a day's march apart.

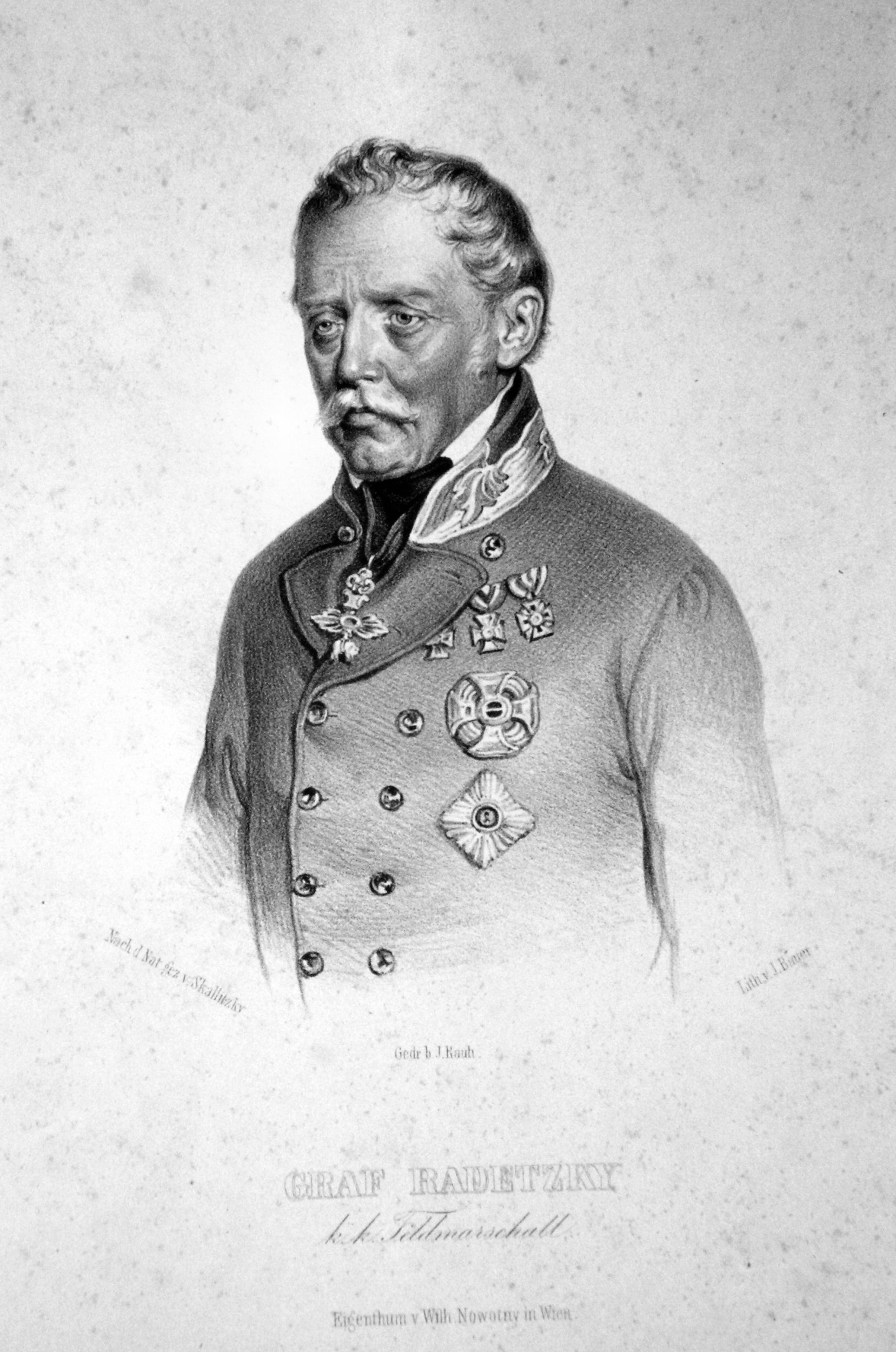
Josef Radetzky, among the first to sense the strategic importance of Verona in the Kingdom of Lombardy-Venetia

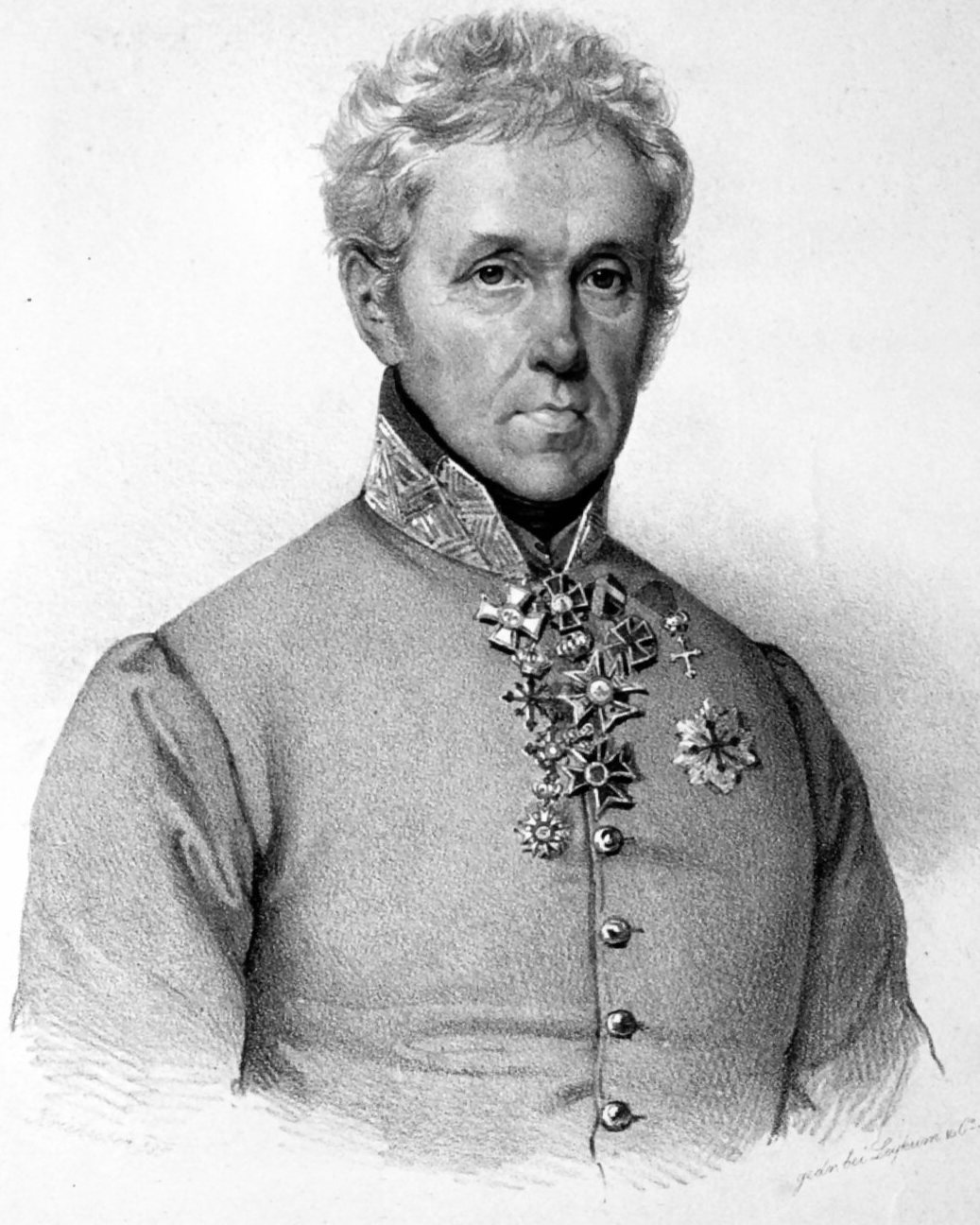
Franz von Scholl, the protagonist of the renovation of the magisterial wall and the construction of numerous detached forts

Austria decided to send General Johann Maria Philipp Frimont with a corps of troops, soon replaced by Marshal Joseph Radetzky, who arrived in Verona with a selected staff and a trained group of military engineering officers headed by General Franz von Scholl, a military engineer in charge of studying the new defensive system, who in 1832 became director of the city's fortifications. By a resolution of February 8, 1833, Emperor Francis I "deigned to decree the reestablishment of the fortifications of Verona and the Mincio line," and on February 15 the War Council in Vienna charged General von Scholl with the study and execution of these works.

Since there was no emergency, as also advised by the director general of engineers von Scholl, the in-depth study of a defensive arrangement with permanent fortifications was begun; Archduke John of Austria thus went to Verona to define with Radetzky and von Scholl the overall arrangement of the magisterial wall. The latter decided to preserve as much as possible of the pre-existing works, thus maintaining the original layout of the medieval and 16th-century city walls and integrating the ramparts that had not been destroyed. The works, which started between 1832 and 1833 and lasted a few years (they were finally completed between 1841 and 1842), (Note: Work start and completion dates vary according to sources.) were directed by von Scholl himself and Johann von Hlavaty and concerned in particular the enclosure to the right of Adige, whose strong point became the ordering to offensive returns, or to "active defense." The bastions of San Zeno, San Bernardino, Santo Spirito, Riformati and Santissima Trinità were all designed on the same planimetric and functional scheme: they were equipped with embankments on which to place the gun ports, with sloping earthen escarpments, at the foot of which the detached "Carnot wall" was built, equipped with embrasures for riflemen and close defense. Along this wall, at the level of the moat, was also placed the defensive caponier on the central point and two "earwalls" along the shoulders, recessed so as to conceal large portals from which offensive sorties could be undertaken.

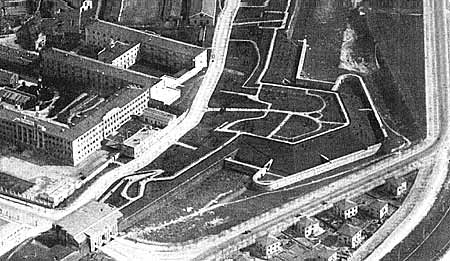
Top view image of the bastion of Holy Spirit, the plan development of which can be observed

The only Sanmichelian bastions that survived the French demolitions, namely those of St. Francis and Spain, were duly respected by the Austrian engineers: the modifications concerned only the earth ramparts for the new artillery emplacements in barbette, the construction of additional defenses in the talus and the opening of posterns for sorties. Equally careful attention was paid to the interventions carried out at the half bastion of the Upper Chain, where there were numerous vestiges of the communal, Scaliger, and Venetian periods: numerous additions and transformations were carried out there, but all easily distinguishable from the pre-existing structures, which were preserved. Finally, between 1837 and 1842, the Scaliger-Venetian curtain wall on the left side of the Adige was restored, in some cases with the rebuilding of some bastions and towers, and it was decided to refurbish castel San Felice, which was in a serious state of neglect at that time. Externally to the castle it was decided to add a ravelin connected to it by a protected corridor, while inside, barracks and storehouses were added.

The firepower assigned to the curtain wall turned out to be considerable, so much so that even during the War of 1866, even though the entire entrenched camp outside the city was complete and in perfect working order, the armament of the Adige right curtain reached the number of 72 guns. However, at the end of the reinforcement of the curtain walls, the tactical problem of the rideau, that is, the natural terracing extended from the built-up area of Santa Lucia and San Massimo to that of Chievo, west of the city, still remained unresolved, a line of natural emplacements against Verona from which, moreover, the enemy could have obstructed external sorties from the magisterial wall.

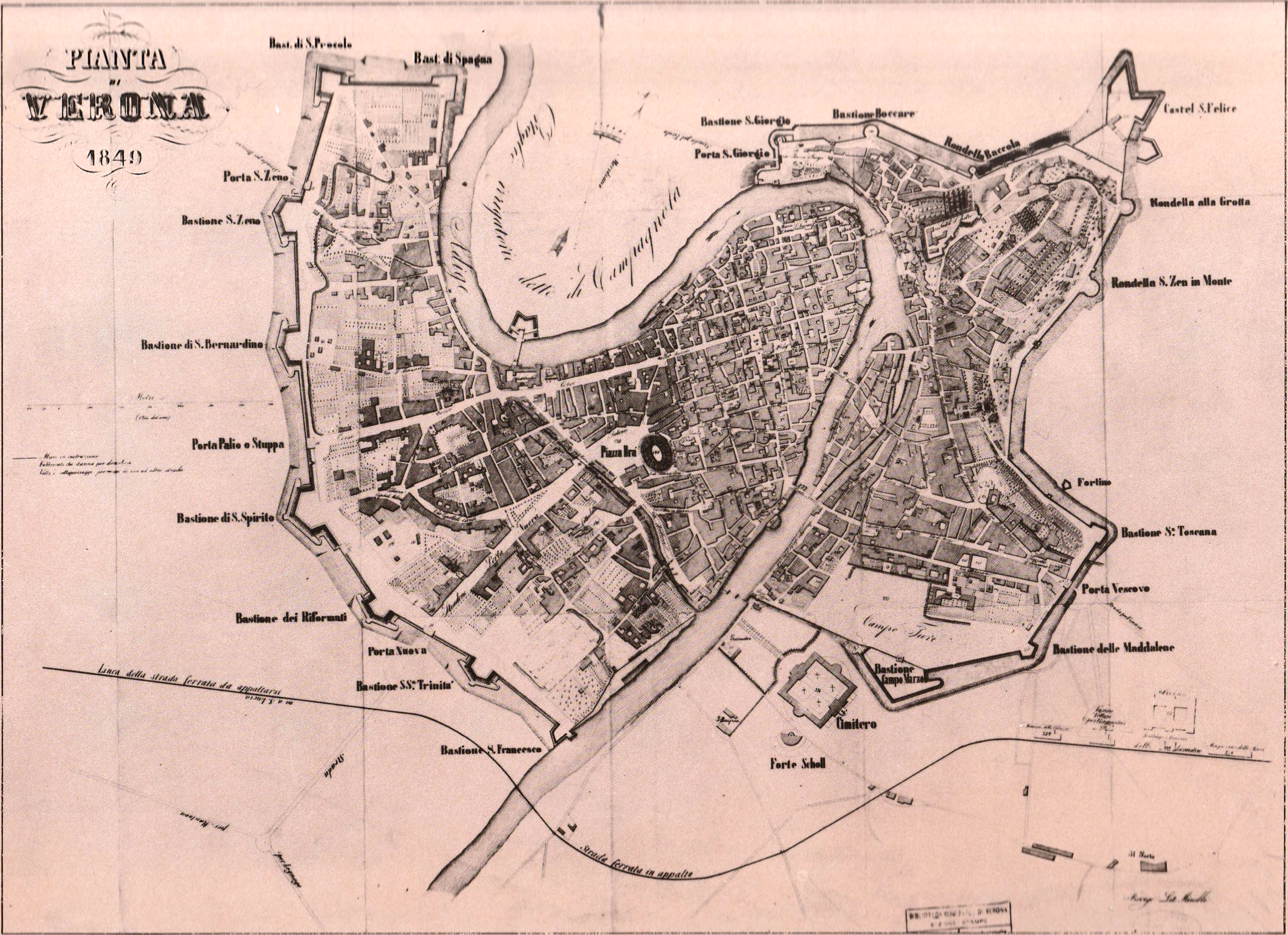
The city's magisterial wall in 1849, upon completion of the work of arranging the parts that had been demolished by the Napoleonists

These works aimed to achieve the goal outlined by Radetzky, which was to convert the city of Verona into a pivot of maneuver and a depot square for the army in the countryside, from which to support defensive and counteroffensive operations in the territory between the Mincio and Adige rivers, also with the support of the strongholds of Peschiera, Mantua and, secondarily, Legnago. Despite the interventions carried out, this program was incomplete at the time, as the stronghold would still not be able to sustain a siege on its own, thus jeopardizing the imperial army's operations.

=== Construction of hill forts and advanced lowland forts ===
In order to give Verona the ability to withstand a siege and thus make it suitable for guarding the army's resources, Franz von Scholl felt the need to provide the city with an additional fortification extension with detached works. He then outlined an initial defensive formulation projected outside the body of the square, traceable to the new theory of the 19th-century entrenched camp with detached forts. The plans prepared in the years between 1834 and 1838, which were not implemented because of the limitations imposed by the imperial treasury, envisaged the arrangement of forts on the natural ledge of Santa Lucia and on that of Santa Caterina to close the great bend of the Adige at San Pancrazio, so as to form a powerful offensive bridgehead.

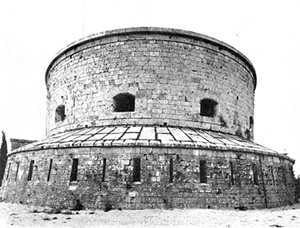

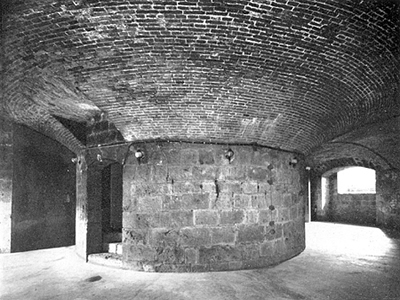
Exterior and interior of the annular artillery casemate of one of the Maximilian towers

In the work carried out from 1837 von Scholl pursued more circumstantial aims, the need to eliminate the tactical and defensive deficiencies of the magisterial wall prevailing. Thus, on the left side of the Adige, to prevent outflanking maneuvers to the north (already carried out by the French in 1805), four casemate towers, called Maximilian towers because of their similarities to the towers built in Linz a few years earlier, conceived by the war theorist Archduke Maximilian of Austria-Este, were built on the ridges of Santa Giuliana. Between 1838 and 1841 the hill entrenched camp was completed to the south, on the heights of St. Matthias and St. Leonard, by the sequence of two other forts and a Maximilian tower complete with perimeter enclosure (Fort St. Matthias and St. Leonard, from the heights on which they were built, and Fort Sofia, designed on the model of the Maximilian towers). These works were assigned the additional function of taking away from the enemy dominant positions close to the western sector of the magisterial enclosure, from the San Felice hill to the church of San Giorgio on the river bank. In the hilly area, but on the opposite slope, a small fort saw the light of day on Biondella Hill, which could not be beaten from any position in the magistral wall behind. Constructed in 1838, Fort Biondella reached the eastern slope of the hill, which was otherwise covered by a dead angle, and thus prevented the enemy from approaching the hill wall, unseen, from the Valpantena. As a whole, this hill fortified system controlled the Avesa valley and the Tyrol road to the west, the Campagnola valley to the south, the Valdonega valley in its interior, the ridges of the last offshoots of Lessinia to the north, and the Valpantena valley to the east.

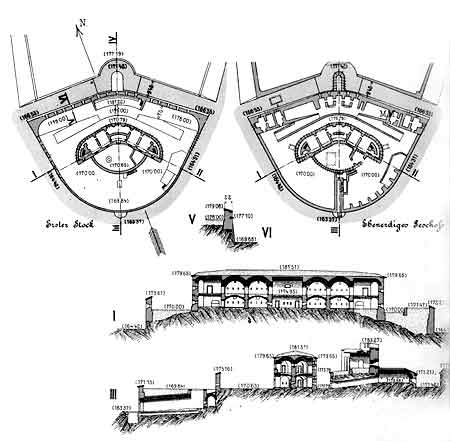
Plans and sections of the hill fort San Leonardo, before its transformation into a sanctuary

The fortifications of the hillside entrenched camp were connected to the magisterial wall by a network of military routes, suitable for the rapid transport of troops and horse-drawn artillery. The most famous of these is the so-called "lasagna," which outside Porta San Giorgio climbs, in the deep trench dug into the tuff and therefore protected from view and firing, toward Fort Sofia and Fort San Leonardo, whose popular name derives from the stone lanes, still present today, suitable for bearing the heavy artillery wagons and the march of the troops that came and went.

In the design and construction of the eight hill forts, von Scholl faced complex problems of adaptation to the morphology of the very rugged site, which he solved with forms of striking planimetric and volumetric articulation. Moreover, based on the eighteenth-century theories developed by Marc René de Montalembert and taking his cue from earlier Swedish artillery towers (built between 1689 and 1731), he worked out an original model of a fortification with a circular layout, integrated with an advanced polygonal enclosure. Archduke Maximilian's models for the Linz towers and almost coeval solutions for the coastal towers at Trieste and Pula also appear in von Scholl's design.

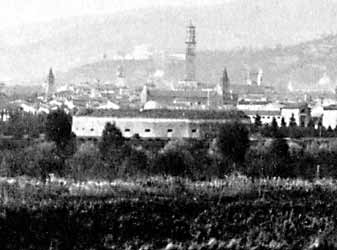
Photograph of Fort Gazometro, one of the advanced lowland forts, with the city of Verona in the background

The same program of fortification integration of the magistral wall was also applied on the plain. On the left side of the Adige River, the construction of military works was required to make compatible the presence of the new monumental cemetery, built in front of the enclosure at the Campo Marzo bastion starting in 1828. A mighty two-story casemate tower-segment battery (or Segmentthurm) then was placed in front of the cemetery toward the Adige, while in 1838 a detached fort named after engineer von Scholl, who had given the design but died that same year during construction, was built about 150 m south of the cemetery. It was later more simply named Fort Gazometro, from the presence of such industrial plants a short distance away.

On the right of the Adige River, a large fort was located in the northern sector, next to the river bank, only 300 m from the bastioned front interposed between the bastion of San Procolo and the bastion of Spagna. Its main function was to cover the depression of the esplanade in front of it and support the defensive function of the two bastions, particularly that of Spain, which had not been modernized by the Austrians. In its imposing layout, Fort St. Prokulus, built between 1840 and 1841, recalls von Scholl's style. It also reflects his early, unimplemented proposal for the indirect defense of the Santa Lucia-San Massimo ridge, which envisioned collateral fortified strongholds: on the left wing the Santa Caterina bridgehead, in the center three forts in front of Porta Nuova, on the right wing Fort San Procolo.

Von Scholl is considered the most eminent military architect of the Austrian Empire, as he had, with an eclectic spirit, experimented with new systems of fortification in Verona, adapting them to the site, to the terrain of implantation, in accordance with the pre-existing magistral walls. He passed on a legacy of building and urban planning wisdom, aesthetic and landscape sensibility that gave foundation to Habsburg fortification culture and would be put to good use in subsequent plans for Verona's detached forts. In the architecture of the hill forts, in the unimplemented plans for the plain forts, von Scholl exemplified in grand style the new fortification theory of the mixed polygonal system, elaborated by the Neo-German school in the original synthesis between the theories of Montalembert and Nicolas Léonard Sadi Carnot.

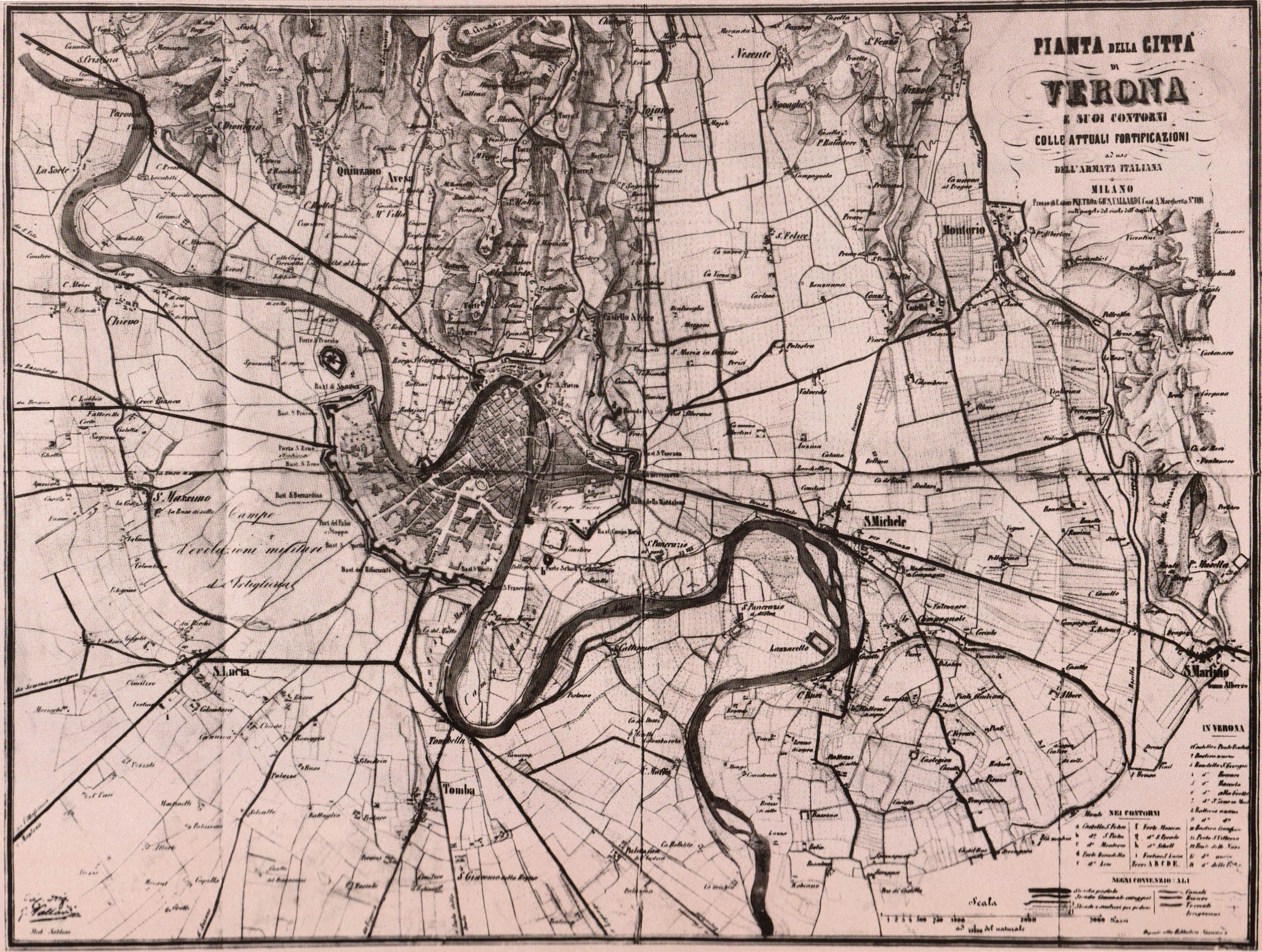
The status of the stronghold and early detached works as of 1848

After his death and the completion in 1844 of the works he had begun, disagreements arose within the general staff. The calming of the European political situation seemed to make the defensive reinforcement of Lombardy-Veneto, and thus the completion of von Scholl's costly plan for Verona, less urgent. In the end, the idea of suspending further development prevailed, thus leaving a city well defended (partly due to favorable morphology) to the north and west, but with several weak points to the south and east, i.e., on the very sides that would be attacked by the Piedmontese during the first Italian War of Independence.

=== Construction of the first plain entrenched camp ===
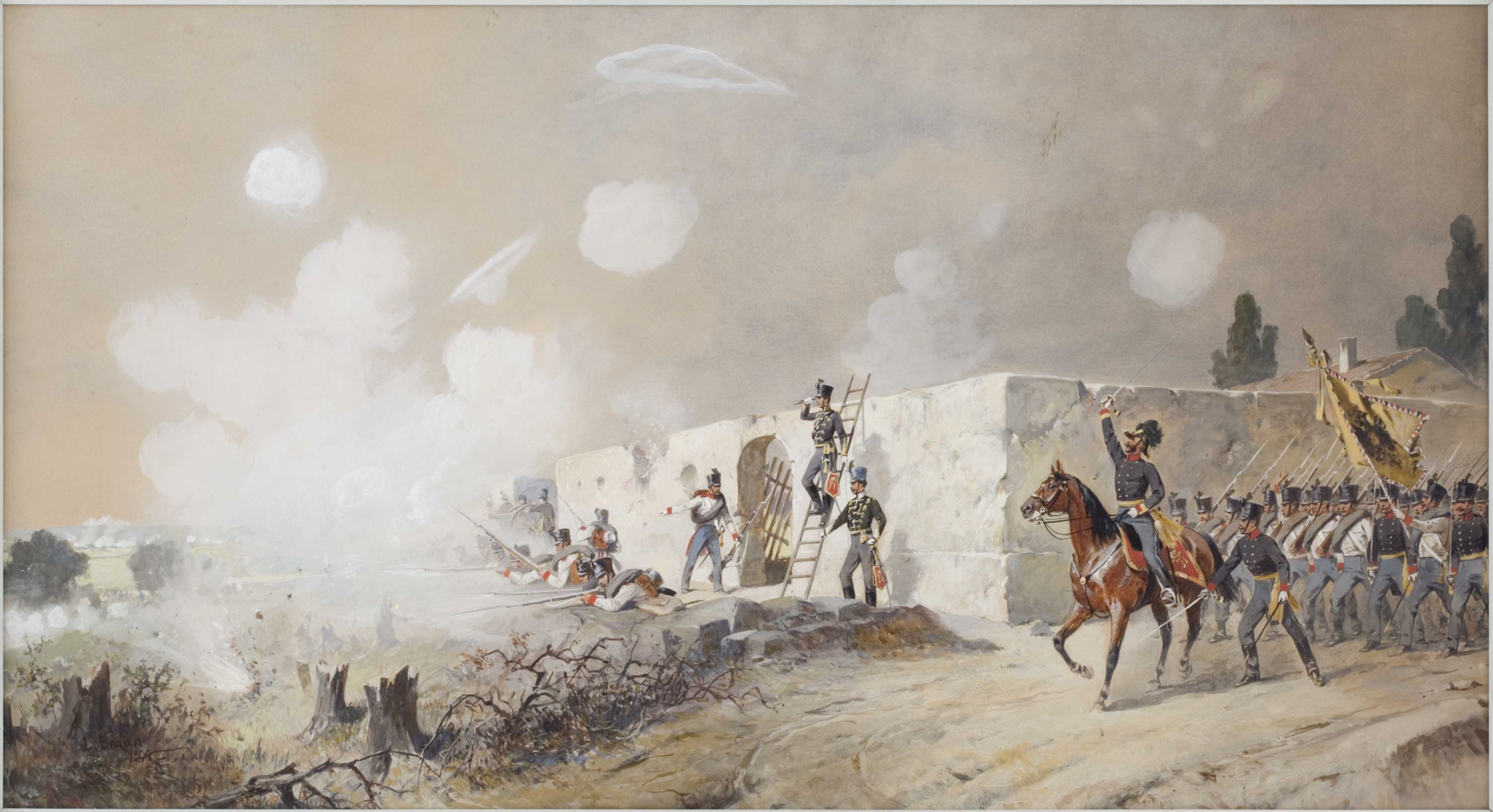
Austrians at the Battle of Santa Lucia: the episode demonstrated the need to include the village in the fortified camp

In May 1848 the Royal Sardinian Army had marched up to the gates of Verona and was confronted by Austrian forces in the Battle of Santa Lucia, which took place in front of the stronghold and only 1,300 m from the magisterial walls. On the day of May 6 precisely along the rideau of Santa Lucia, near the village of the same name, the major clash took place; these were the places that as early as 1833-1838 von Scholl had wanted to secure for defense with the three outer fortified strongholds of Santa Caterina, Porta Nuova, and San Procolo, or to garrison directly with detached works, but which Field Marshal Radetzky ultimately decided not to concretize as he was convinced that the natural esplanade itself could constitute a viable defense and was in any case sufficiently protected by the batteries placed along the magistral enclosure and in field works.

Immediately after the battle, on May 15, 1848, Radetzky then ordered the construction of seven redoubts (of ground only) to be placed to the right of the Adige, along the edge of the rideau, the arched natural terracing overlooking the esplanade ahead of the Venetian city. They formed the line of the first entrenched camp: to the east it is connected to the Adige near Tombetta (Basso Acquar, Campo del Matto), then follows the ridge to San Massimo, finally declining toward the esplanade, in the direction of the existing fort San Procolo, where it ends.

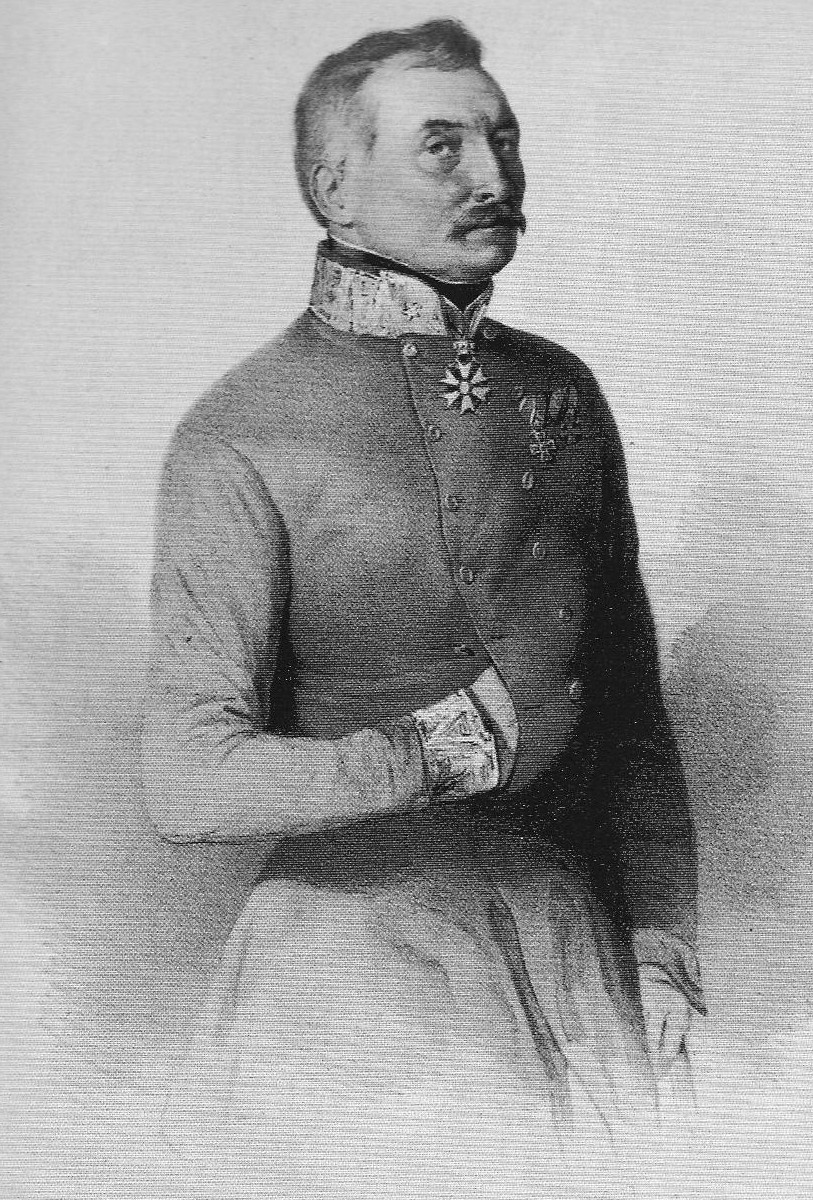
Johann von Hlavaty, director of the k.k. Genie-Direktion Verona and designer of the first forts of the lowland entrenched camp.

The design of the polygonal earthen redoubts was prepared for the later construction within them of bomb-proof towers attached to the gorge front. The redoubts were completed at the end of 1848, while the casemate towers, with a circular layout, were built in 1849 inside the Radetzky (or Fort San Zeno), d'Aspre (or Fort Fenilone), Wratislaw (or Fort Palio), and Clam (or Fort Porta Nuova) redoubts, which thus became true detached fortifications; in the same period the isolated tower Culoz (or tower Tombetta) was built near the descending bend of the Adige River, in front of the settlement of the same name. The design of these first forts of the entrenched camp - whose works were named after commanders who had distinguished themselves during the Battle of Santa Lucia - was due to the director of engineering von Hlavaty, who was succeeded in 1850 by Conrad Petrasch.

Between 1850 and 1852 the Austrians resumed reinforcement work. They completed the first entrenched camp by extending it on the wings so as to hook it, upstream and downstream, to the right bank of the Adige: on the ledge, in front of Chievo, the Chievo and White Cross forts were built; on the Santa Caterina ledge the great fort Santa Caterina, a work that became fundamental following the construction of the high embankment of the Ferdinandea railway in 1849, which had definitively limited the action of the Gazometro fort and the artilleries placed on the magisterial wall. Between 1854 and 1856, on the left bank, the entrenched camp was completed by Fort San Michele, near Madonna di Campagna, straddling the road to Vicenza, and the field post attached to the medieval castle of Montorio Veronese.

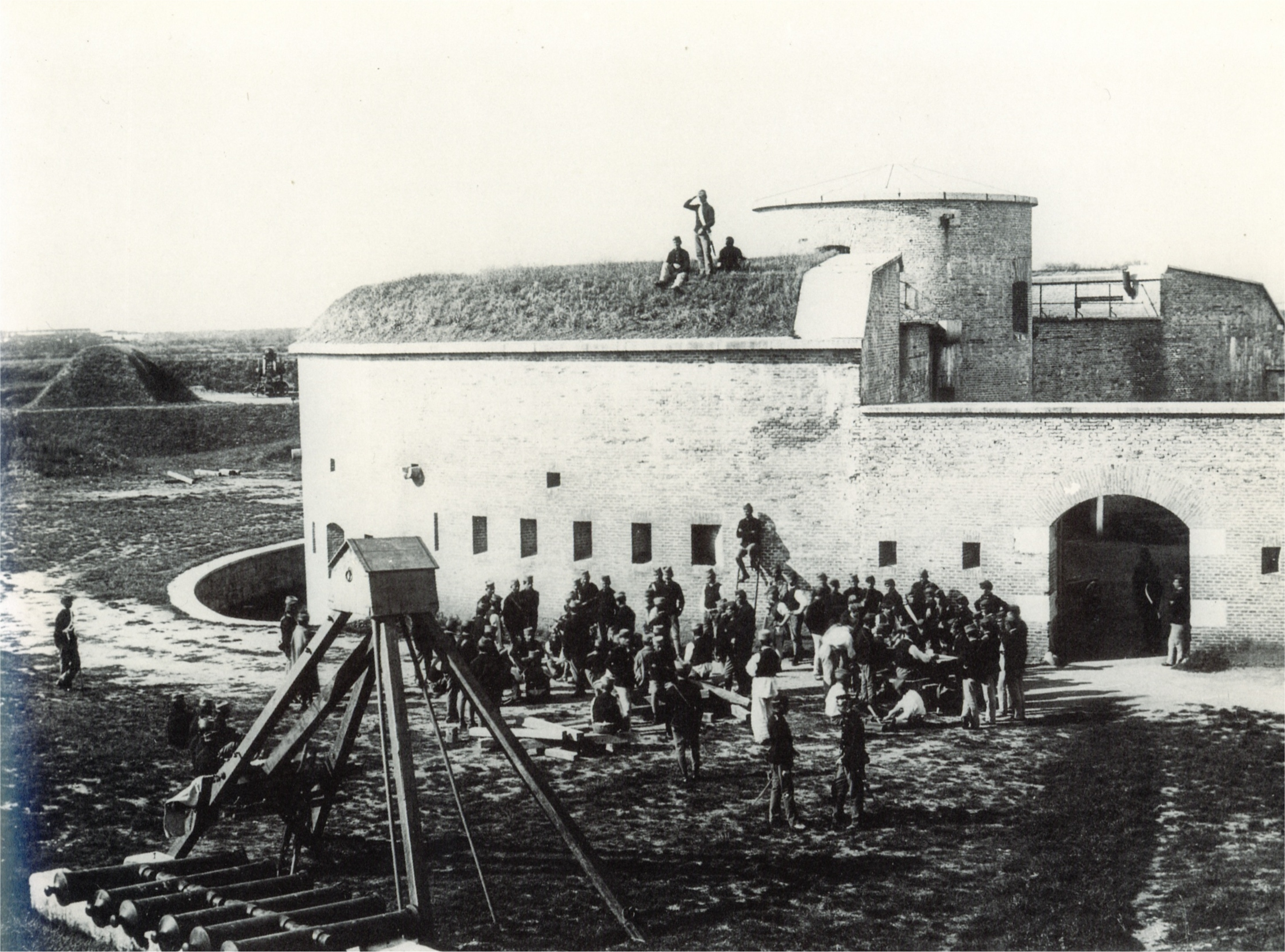
Fort Porta Nuova following the completion of the permanent works in 1849

On the right of the Adige, the eleven new forts were between 800/1000 m and 2300/2400 m away from the magistral wall, according to the position forced by the natural line of the rideau and the new railroads to Venice and Brescia, to Mantua, and later to Trentino; the interval between one and the other measured 800/1000 m on average. (Note: Distances vary from source to source.) On the left of the Adige, where only one fortification was built, Fort San Michele was 3200 m from Porta Vescovo; its position was collateral to the fortified high ground of Montorio and it made a system with it. It was kept, moreover, the necessary distance from the rear village of San Michele extra moenia.

When the Second War of Italian Independence ended, with the Armistice of Villafranca on July 11, 1859, some of the forts of the rideau were then completed with bodies for close defense: detached Carnot-style walls, caponiers, and closing walls of the ravine front. The work involved forts San Zeno, San Massimo, Fenilone, Palio, and Porta Nuova. At the same time Habsburg military commanders began to assess the need for a new, more advanced line of detached forts to cope with the increased range of the new rifled-core artillery, already deployed on the battlefield.

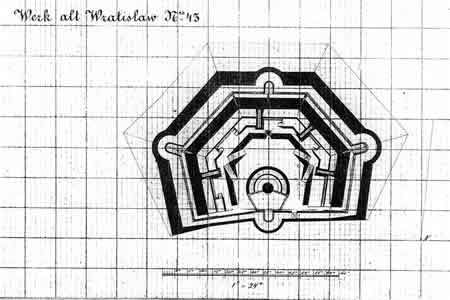
Planimetry of Fort Palio from 1865, where the Carnot-style wall and the three caponiers from 1859 can be distinguished

The forts of the first entrenched camp also belong, like those designed by von Scholl, to the new mixed polygonal system of the Neo-German fortification school, which was tested after 1820 at the sites of the federal strongholds, on the Rhine and the Danube. The forts consisted of the polygonal system embankment, prepared for barbette artillery, defended on the outside by the detached Carnot-style wall, with caponiers for close defense, and the dry ditch in front. Inside the work, in a central position, stood the casemate redoubt, whose plan could vary and articulate according to specific defensive functions. The irregular boundary of the entrenched field, discontinuous but perfectly enclosed by the intersection of artillery shots, was fixed by the terracing of alluvial origin and geometric considerations. The irregularity of the terrain was reflected both in the arrangement in the field space of the individual works and in their planimetric configuration, both of which were conditioned by the mutual flanking and effectiveness of the offensive action.

Because of this articulated system, the Verona stronghold became able to withstand a regular siege and to serve, as per Radetzky's wishes, as a "square of maneuver and depot." In the space of the entrenched camp, the Austrian army would in fact find safe protection in retreat maneuvers, having then the possibility of resuming offensive action. In addition, the built-up area was shielded from bombardment, so it was possible to place logistical equipment within the urban core according to a large-scale urban arrangement plan led by Conrad Petrasch.

=== Construction of the second plain entrenched camp ===
After the defeat of 1859 and the subsequent treaty of Zurich on November 10, 1859, the fortified system of the Quadrilatero took on vital importance for the security of the remaining Habsburg dominions in Italy: following the cession of Lombardy to the Kingdom of Sardinia, the state frontier came to coincide with the line of the Mincio, i.e., precisely with the western front of the Quadrilatero. The establishment of the Kingdom of Italy in 1861 and the unconcealed aspiration to annex Veneto as well made it necessary for Austrian commanders to plan the defense according to a strategic design with a regional dimension.

The Quadrilateral fortifications were coordinated in a larger system extending from Venice, an imposing land and sea stronghold, to Rovigo, a formidable offensive bridgehead on the lower Adige River, characterized by the presence of four forts built between 1862 and 1863. The Quadrilatero itself had been supplemented and expanded with a double bridgehead on the Po River, at Borgoforte, with a total of four more forts built in the years 1860–1861, with the hill fortifications of Pastrengo, to form a bridgehead on the right of the Adige, with a total of four forts built in 1861, and finally with the Chiusa Veneta barrage system at the outlet of the Adige Valley, which had already been fortified between 1849 and 1852, with the roadside cut-off and the three forts located on the dominant rocky surroundings.

In addition to the political and military reorganization of the territory, it was necessary to take into account the extraordinary technological innovations in armaments, with the advent on the battlefields of breech-loading and rifled-core artillery: devised by Piedmontese General Giovanni Cavalli, they were immediately adopted by the French Army and shortly thereafter by the newly created Royal Army, imposing a profound revision in the layout of the strongholds and in the constructive arrangement of the individual fortified works. This was due to the increased range of the guns (which could reach 4500–6000 m), the considerable increase in accuracy in firing, and the increased penetration and explosive power of the cylindrical-ogival projectiles.

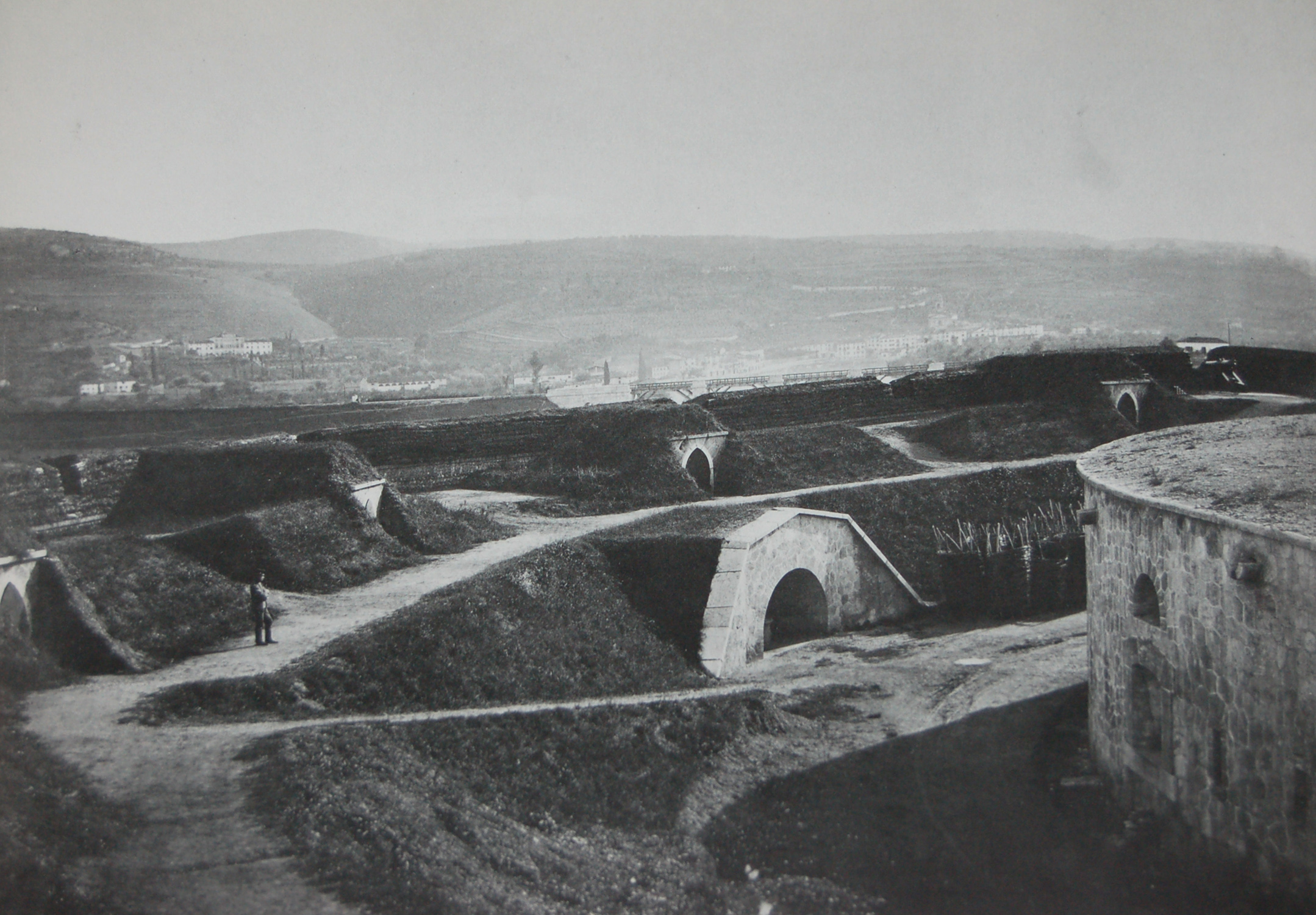
Fort Parona, built on the right bank to guard the new railway bridge

To protect Verona, the main depot and maneuver square of the Quadrilatero, the entrenched field of the rideau therefore became insufficient, as it was partly incomplete and, above all, too close to the magisterial wall with respect to the range of the new artillery. Immediately after the war, still in 1859, work began on a further extension of the entrenched camp at the ends of the existing fortified line: on the right bank of the Adige, to the northwest, Fort Parona was built, to guard the new railway bridge at Parona; to the northeast, on the hill of Montorio near the old Scaliger castle and already during the war, temporary batteries were arranged to complete the defense of the eastern sector: later the fortification was made final and took the name Fort Preara, assisted by Fort San Michele. These fortifying extensions were a prelude to the final expansion of the entrenched camp with a new, more advanced line of detached forts, in order to remove the body of the square, with its fundamental military establishments, factories and barracks, as well as the civilian community itself, from artillery bombardment.

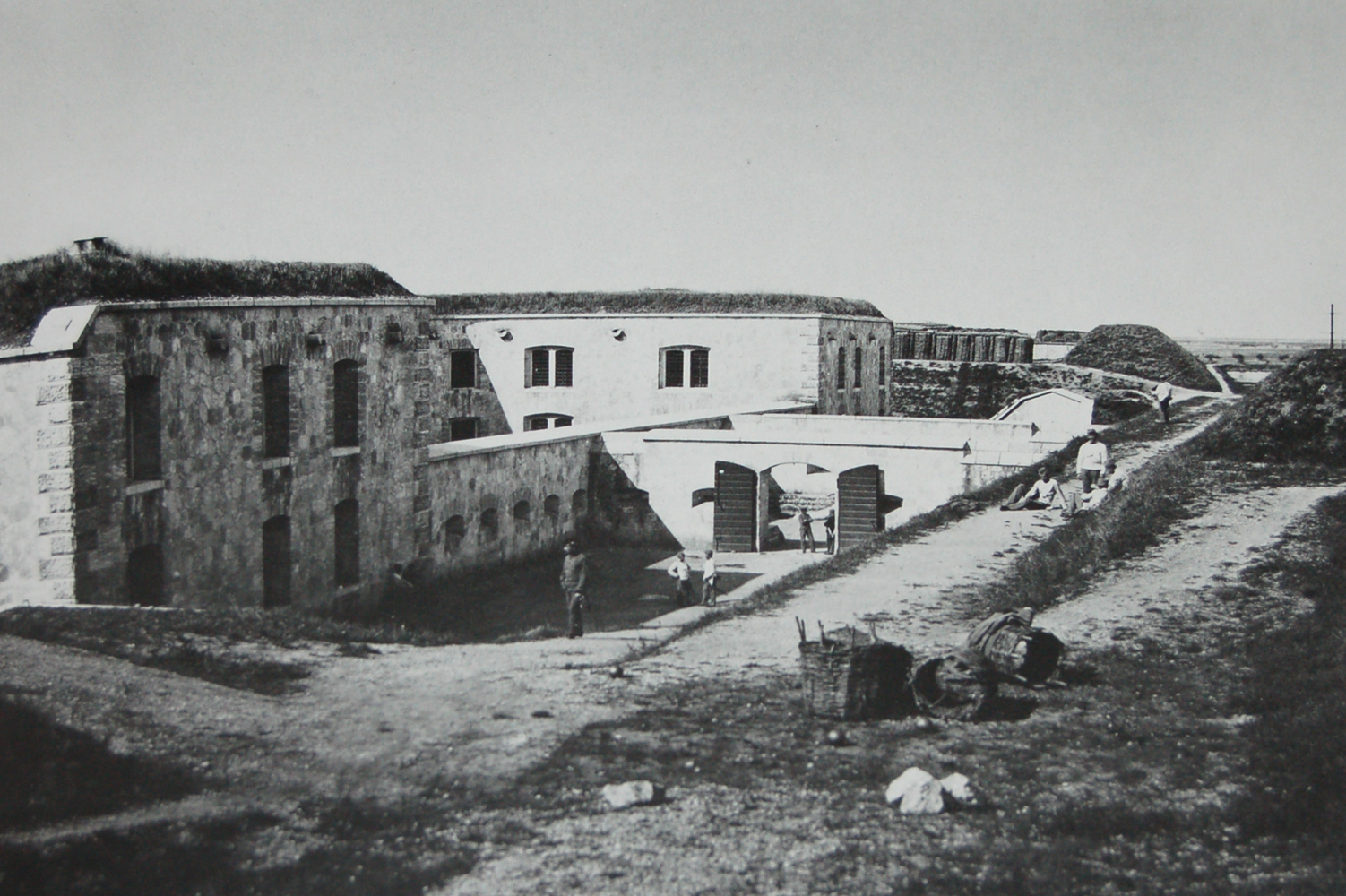
Fort Dossobuono in an 1863 photograph by Moritz Lotze

In the spring of 1860 Archduke Leopold, inspector general of engineering, presided in Verona over the commission assembled to determine the layout of the new detached forts, which were to form the most advanced line of the entrenched camp. On the main front of the stronghold, to the right of the Adige, the new fortified line unfolded along a 15-kilometer-long route. To the north it began, on the Adige, with Fort Parona under construction and included the pre-existing Fort Chievo; then it drew in the plain a large advanced arc, at the average distance of 3500–3800 m from the magisterial wall. On it, at intervals of 2000–2700 m, the construction of four forts was established, located respectively in front of San Massimo (Fort Lugagnano), in front of Santa Lucia (Fort Dossobuono), on the road to Azzano (Fort Azzano) and in front of Tomba-San Giacomo (Fort Tomba). To the southeast, the fifth position to be fortified near the bank of the Adige River, at Cà Vecchia, where the fort of the same name was later built, was also identified during the Third Italian War of Independence (1866). It was also decided to strengthen the eastern, left-bank sector with a new work on the Montorio hill (the aforementioned fort Preara) and with the adaptation of the Scaliger castle for the numerous fortress artillery positions. Finally, an intermediate position on the plain between Fort San Michele and Montorio Hill was identified, where Fort Cà Bellina was erected in 1866.

In the plan outlined by Archduke Leopold, with the director of engineering and the artillery commander, Verona reached its maximum extent as a fortified city, at the end of a long evolution that had lasted nearly two thousand years.

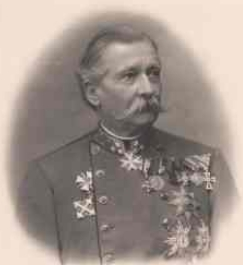
Daniel von Salis-Soglio, designer of the four detached right bank forts

The forts of the right bank entrenched camp were built according to a unique model, adaptable to different positions and specific defensive combat tasks. The guiding design, defined in Vienna by the General Genie Inspection, was derived directly from drawings prepared by Captain Daniel von Salis-Soglio, serving in the k.k. Genie-Direktion Verona. The captain, who in 1861 had designed and directed work on the four forts of the Pastrengo bridgehead and had recently begun work on Fort Parona, had taken into account for the latter series of fortifications a plan outlined in 1855 by his predecessor General Petrasch. Von Salis-Soglio, who became one of the most distinguished European military architects of the second half of the nineteenth century, gave the first proof of his technical and artistic talent precisely in Verona, in the four forts of the second entrenched right bank camp, designed and built in a single year: up to 13,000 workers worked daily at the vast construction site, which was completed in the spring of 1861, with the Austrian captain coordinating the group of executive planners and construction managers, consisting of eight officers of the Engineer Corps; he himself directed the construction site of Fort Lugagnano.

Von Salis's four forts (Lugagnano, Dossobuono, Azzano and Tomba) summed up the essence of the Austro-Prussian polygonal fortification system; there, the Neo-German school of fortification achieved a result of excellence and, moreover, the prototypes of the new fortification were born there in 1866 with the works of Lieutenant Colonel Andreas Tunkler, who had already worked together with von Salis-Soglio in the conception of this new defensive circle.

=== Completion of the second plain entrenched camp ===
By the imminence of the Third Italian War of Independence, Verona was one of the largest and safest strongholds in the Habsburg Empire and was equipped with the most modern logistical facilities, connected by an efficient railroad network to the other strongholds of the Venetian defense system, as well as to the center of the Empire, so much so that it became famous throughout Europe.

On April 22, 1866, a few days after the conclusion of the alliance between Prussia and the newly formed Kingdom of Italy, the engineer detachment at the army high command decreed in Verona the preparation of the state of defense in all the strongholds of the Veneto region. It was then decided to equip the permanent fortifications with complementary works, in order to increase the resistance capacity, security and effectiveness of combat action. Constructed from rammed earth, timbers, wicker gabions and other perishable materials, these measures concerned the artillery emplacements of the existing forts, where parapets were strengthened and merlons built; the emplacements, where embanked shelters for artillery gunners and for powder supplies were made, the powder magazines, which were strengthened with thicknesses of rammed earth, the outside of the fortifications, where passive obstacles were prepared, such as fences of sturdy sharp poles and cut trees with branches facing the enemy. In addition, new shelters for men and draught animals were built in the outer forts with armored wooden structures. Finally, between the forts of the entrenched camp, the intervals were supplemented with intermediate field batteries. All this had been largely completed by the start of hostilities on June 23, 1866, so Verona and the Quadrilateral forts were ready to withstand an enemy attack.

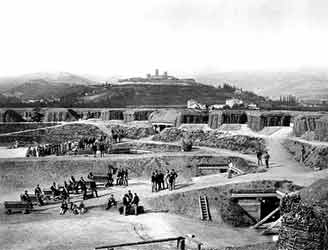
The main front of Fort Cà Bellina with fighting positions and, in the background, Montorio Castle; below, the embankment with garrison shelters and the palisades of the ravine front

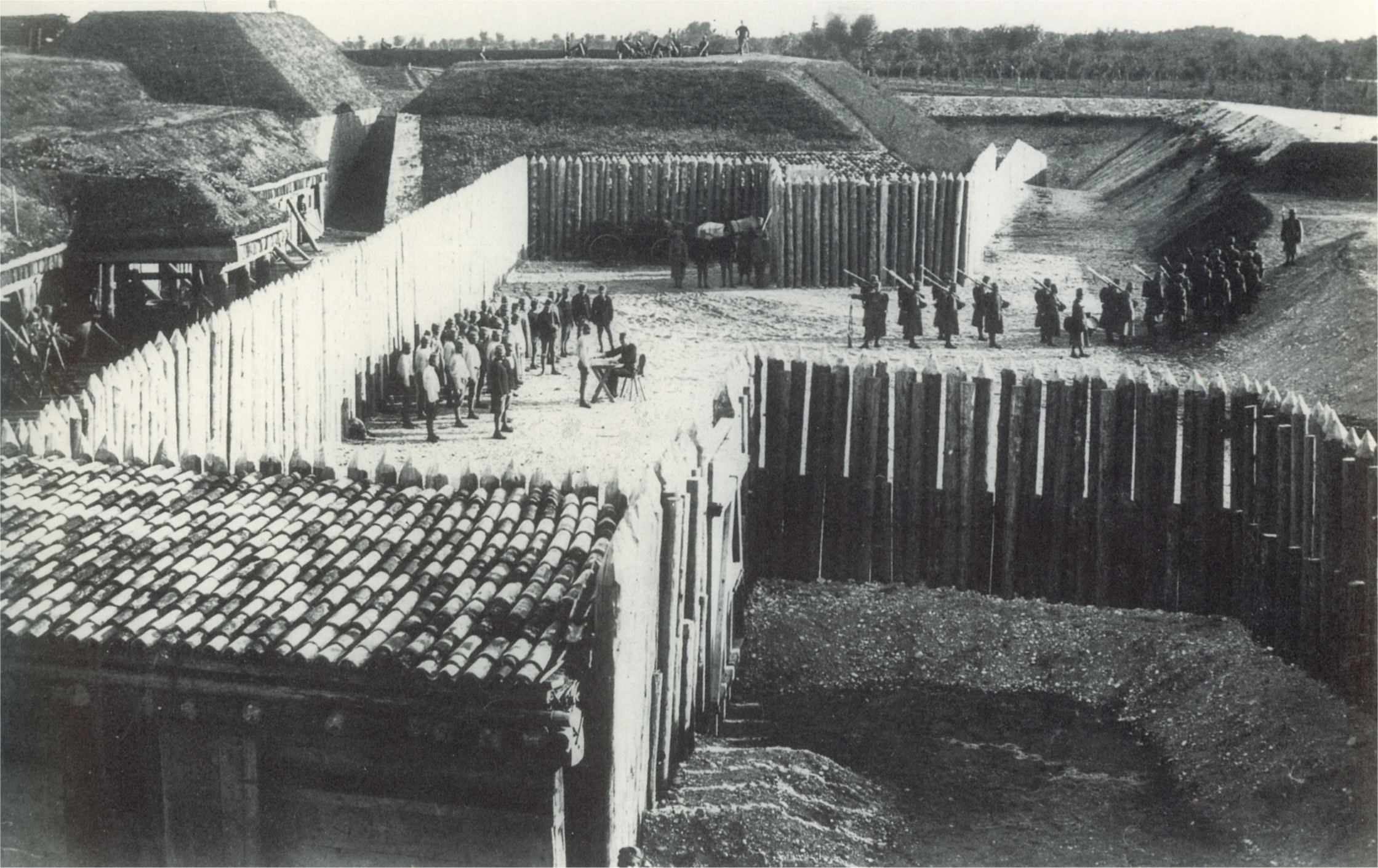

In Verona, in particular, the first line of the entrenched camp was supplemented by the construction of large field batteries erected in the intervals between the belt forts, some of which were named after nearby rural courts: on the right bank, from Fort Lugagnano to the Adige, the Fenilone, Martinelli, Torcolo, Legnago, Palazzina and Sant'Andrea batteries; on the left bank, the Casotte and Sandri batteries, located between Fort San Michele and the river bend of San Pancrazio.

In addition to these devices for the preparation of the defense, extraordinary interventions were added to complete the advanced line of the entrenched camp and to fill the gaps in the deployment. On the positions already identified and established by the commission chaired by Archduke Leopold in the great fortification plan of 1860, two large forts were erected: the first, Fort Cà Vecchia, to close the advanced line near the right bank of the Adige; the second, Fort Cà Bellina, on the left bank, to consolidate the eastern front between Fort San Michele and the hill of Montorio. The plans were drawn up with extraordinary celerity by Tunkler, who in the second half of the nineteenth century was considered one of the most distinguished practitioners of the Corps of Engineers in Europe, not least because of his considerable scientific and technical activity as a treatise writer on fortifications, at the Habsburg Academy in Kloster Bruck.

Tunkler, whose name is carved inside the catering establishment of Santa Marta, was the last great military architect in the history of fortified Verona. Given the urgency, he envisaged the construction of two forts in semi-permanent style, that is, consisting of earthworks, timber and with minimal use of masonry; however, they were designed so that when peace was restored, they could be completed, in permanent style, with masonry works: scarp revetments around the embankments, vaulted canopies, casemated caponiers and traverses, shelters and bomb-proof powder magazines. The work, completed on May 23, 1866, was conducted with great celerity and finished completely by mid-August, by which time the armistice had already been signed.

Tunkler was nonetheless awarded the Knight's Cross of the Order of Leopold for the extraordinary construction feat at the site and for the design of two forts considered as models for contemporary fortifications, from which originated the "Tunkler-type" fort, applied in the new permanent defenses of the major European strongholds of the second half of the 19th century, particularly in Prussia, and adapted to the technological evolution of the improved rear-loading field artillery. These two achievements of special technical and historical significance, however, were lost precisely because of the use of perishable material and the abandonment of transformation into permanent forts, caused by the annexation of the Veneto region to the Kingdom of Italy.

=== Handover of the stronghold to the Kingdom of Italy ===
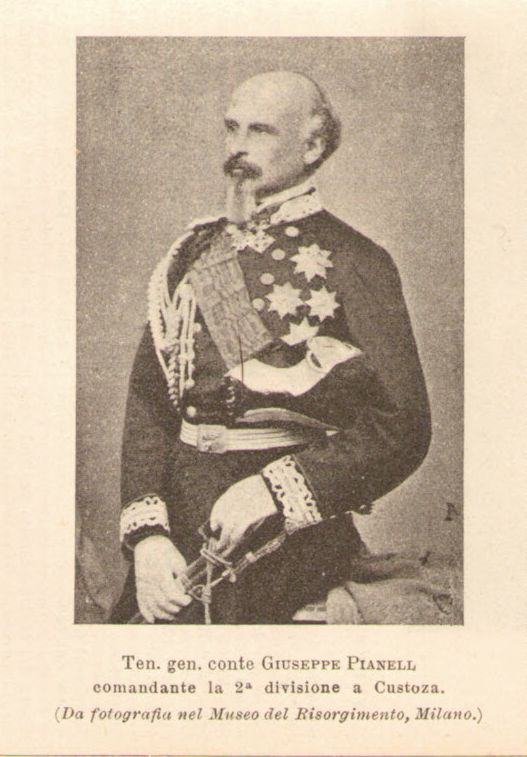
General Pianell, among the main promoters of the preservation of the Veronese stronghold

Veneto, at the end of the 1866 campaign, did not immediately pass into Italian hands, but remained under Austrian rule for some time longer. Before leaving the offices of the k.k. Genie-Direktion Verona, the Habsburg army therefore had the opportunity to pick up all documentation related to military works, which arrived in Vienna by rail convoy.

The stronghold of Verona and the rest of Veneto and Mantua were handed over to the Italian government through the mediation of the French general Edmond Le Bœuf: he stopped over in the city of Verona and, in the brief interlude before the final handover to the Kingdom of Italy, commissioned surveys of the newer fortifications, particularly those designed by Tunkler. Almost certainly the engineer Henri Alexis Brialmont, at that time head of the French fortification school and engaged in the construction of the Antwerp entrenched camp, had occasion to examine these studies; he described the forts of Cà Vecchia and Cà Bellina in his two-volume publication La fortification à fossés secs, in which he praised some of the design solutions adopted by Tunkler, which he later resumed in the construction of the Parisian forts of Haute Bruyères and Montretout.

Passed to the Kingdom of Italy on October 15, 1866, the Verona fort, although less garrisoned and armed with outdated artillery, was kept in perfect working order until the end of the century. It was in particular General Giuseppe Salvatore Pianell, who ended his career in Verona after the Third War of Independence, who promoted the integral preservation of the military works, while other voices began to argue about the actual validity of the Verona stronghold and the entire Quadrilatero: in the end, a military commission, chaired by Pianell himself, declared them still technically and strategically valid.

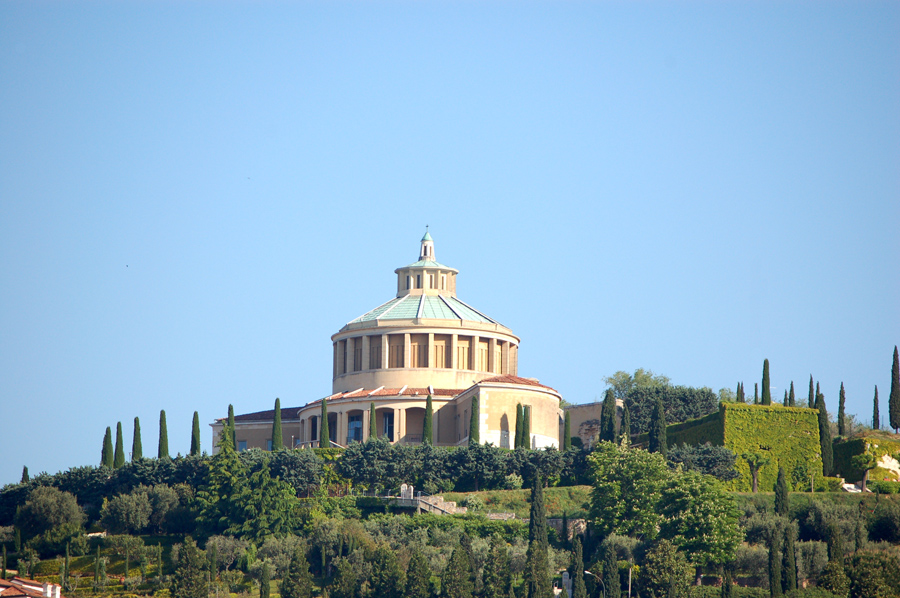
The former Fort St. Leonard, granted in 1952 by the military domain to the Stigmatines congregation, which repurposed it as a shrine

However, over the years, new and modern fortifications designed by Brialmont and Italian military engineers were erected near the border with the Austro-Hungarian Empire. In the last decade of the nineteenth century, moreover, armies adopted smokeless gunpowder instead of black gunpowder: increasingly disruptive shells and artillery with improved ranges eventually rendered the city's defenses, which were now too close together, unsuitable. At this point the Verona fortress was downgraded to a second-line structure.

During World War I the structures were not armed, but used simply as depots or as a stopover for the transit and rest of troops headed to the Italian front. Later, for the most part, they were abandoned by the military authorities, and some were tampered with or even demolished: nevertheless, of the thirty-one forts built in Verona in the nineteenth century, nineteen are still standing.

== Logistics ==
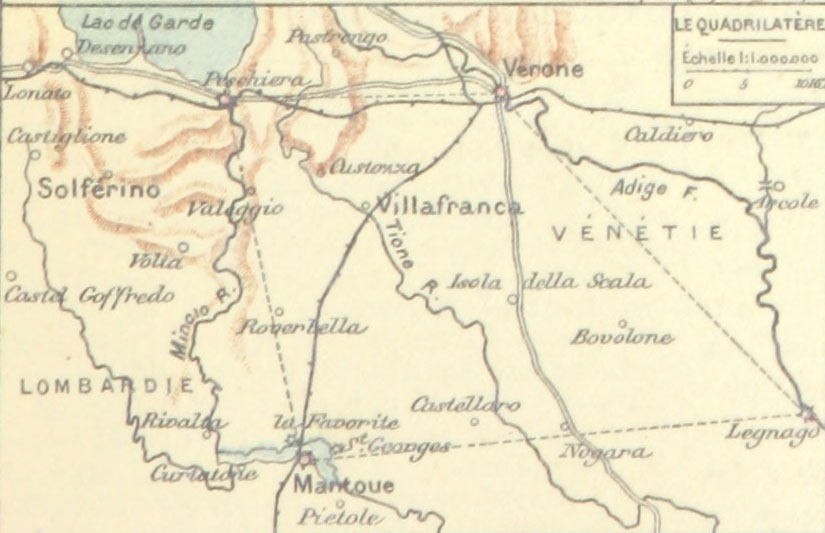
Map of 1888, showing the fortresses of the Quadrilatero

Between the mid-1830s and 1866, a plan for the gradual insertion of military buildings and establishments, intended for the various activities and logistical needs of the Habsburg army, was implemented in the urban core of Verona because of the strategic function that Field Marshal Radetzky had assigned to the city. In addition, after the War of 1848–1849, Verona became a vital center of the Quadrilateral fortification apparatus: the three advanced strongholds of Peschiera, Mantua and Legnago were responsible for the operational combat functions, as maneuver strongholds, while the city of Verona, in addition to its function as a maneuver stronghold, played the role of a depot stronghold, as its fortificatory arrangement guaranteed the Austrian army a support base for tactical retreats, offensive returns and war maneuvers. Finally, the city's geographical location, in direct road and rail connection with the center of the Habsburg monarchy, and its position in the theater of war, protected from the other advanced strongholds of the Quadrilatero, gave Verona the special characteristics necessary to stand as a depot stronghold.

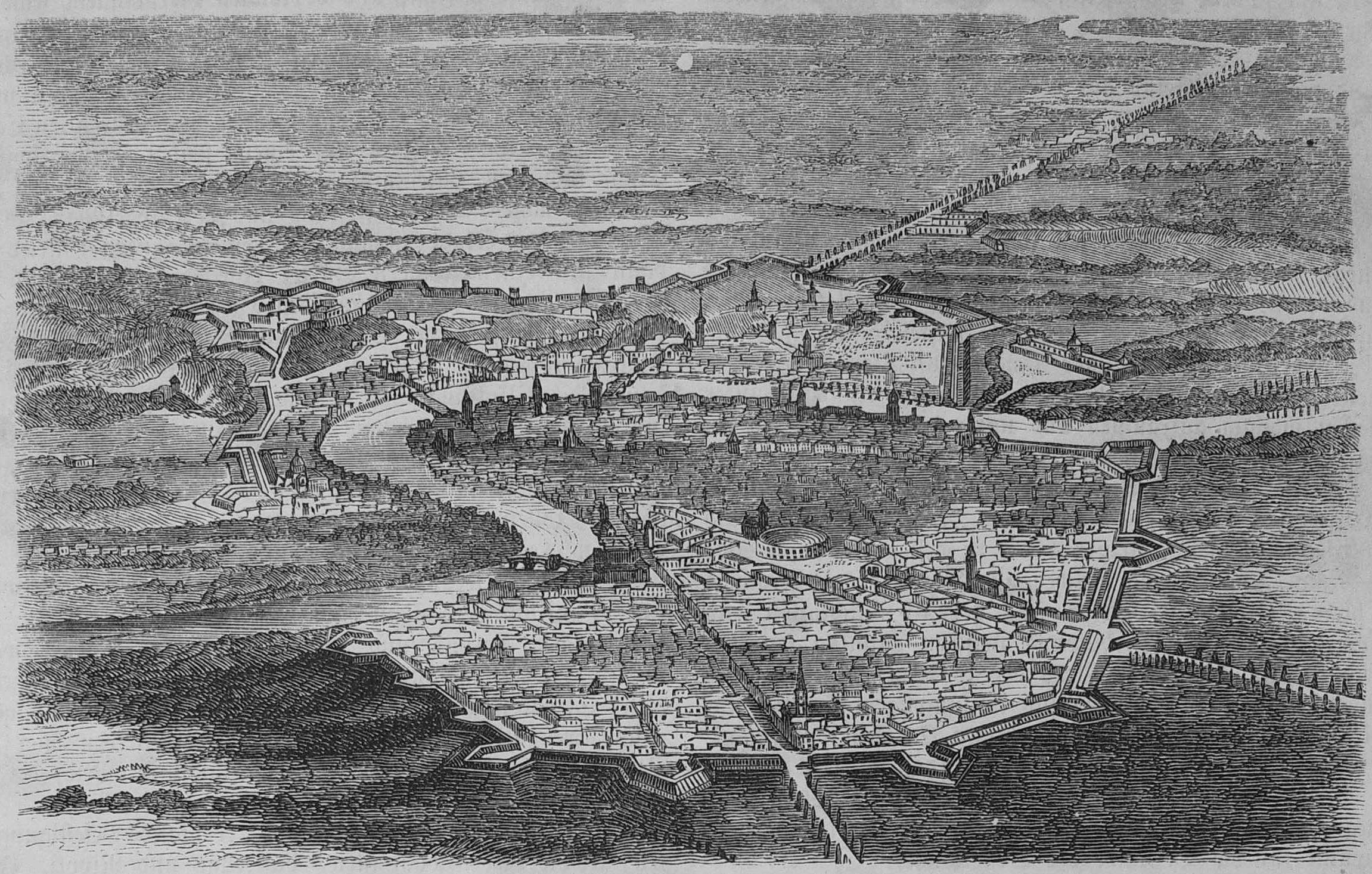
Bird's eye view of 1866 Verona

In view of the functions and importance assumed by the fortress, various organs were transferred there: in particular, after 1849, the operational headquarters of the Imperial royal civil and military government was relocated there from Milan, so that Radetzky, who until 1857 was commanding general of the troops stationed in Lombardy-Veneto, was housed in Palazzo Carli; the government offices, long held by Marshal Ludwig von Benedek, were instead transferred to the convent of the church of Sant'Eufemia, where there was already a barracks beforehand. The Imperial royal city and fortress command, on which both the garrison and the fortification works depended, was placed in the final headquarters of the Gran Guardia Nuova, an imposing and austere neoclassical palace located in the central Piazza Bra, rivaling the Gran Guardia Vecchia and the Roman amphitheater. That structure had been specially built and commissioned from architect and engineer Giuseppe Barbieri; construction, followed later by Francesco Ronzani, began in 1836 and ended only after his death in 1843.

Given its role, Verona was given a well-maintained fortified apparatus, such that it would not be subject to blows and would withstand regular siege operations, while also ensuring that the urban core, in which the military buildings and establishments were established, would be shielded from enemy bombardment: necessary security conditions that were guaranteed by the double line of the entrenched camp.

=== Articulation of military buildings and establishments ===
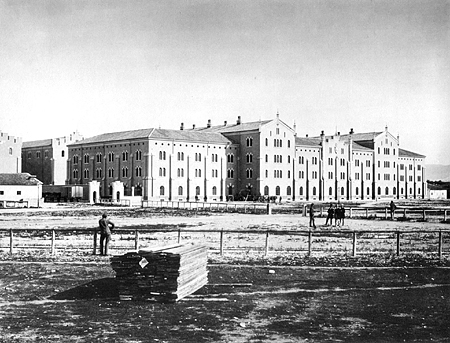
The catering establishment of Santa Marta, built between 1863 and 1865, could produce about 55000 kilograms of bread and biscuits every day, employing about 150 workers

Within the magisterial enclosure, the complex planning of military buildings and establishments therefore had to respond to two distinct operational orders: the first concerned the logistical services needed by the stronghold, and the second the logistical services functional to the army of Italy mobilized for the war.

At the time of the war in 1866, defending the stronghold, the square corps and the outer forts, there was a garrison consisting of as many as 13,000 soldiers, to which were added 1,600 horses for the various needs of mobility and transportation and a total endowment of more than 500 guns, (Note: According to Vittorio Jacobacci, the stronghold had reached its maximum number of 20000 soldiers, 6000 horses and 612 guns, to which could be added another 99 units in the Rivoli and Pastrengo group forts and 111 reserve units. In Jacobacci (1986, pp. 135, 143).) requiring barracks for quartering soldiers, factories and warehouses to produce and store ammunition, as well as all other equipment necessary for the life of the men, horses and for combat. Further planning then concerned the second operational order belonging to the depot square, namely the logistical services to support the field army: in 1850 Radetzky stipulated that the army of Italy, on the war footing, be given the strength of 70000-80000 men, but in 1859 the men on the battlefield even increased to 110000, with 384 artillery pieces and several thousand horses.

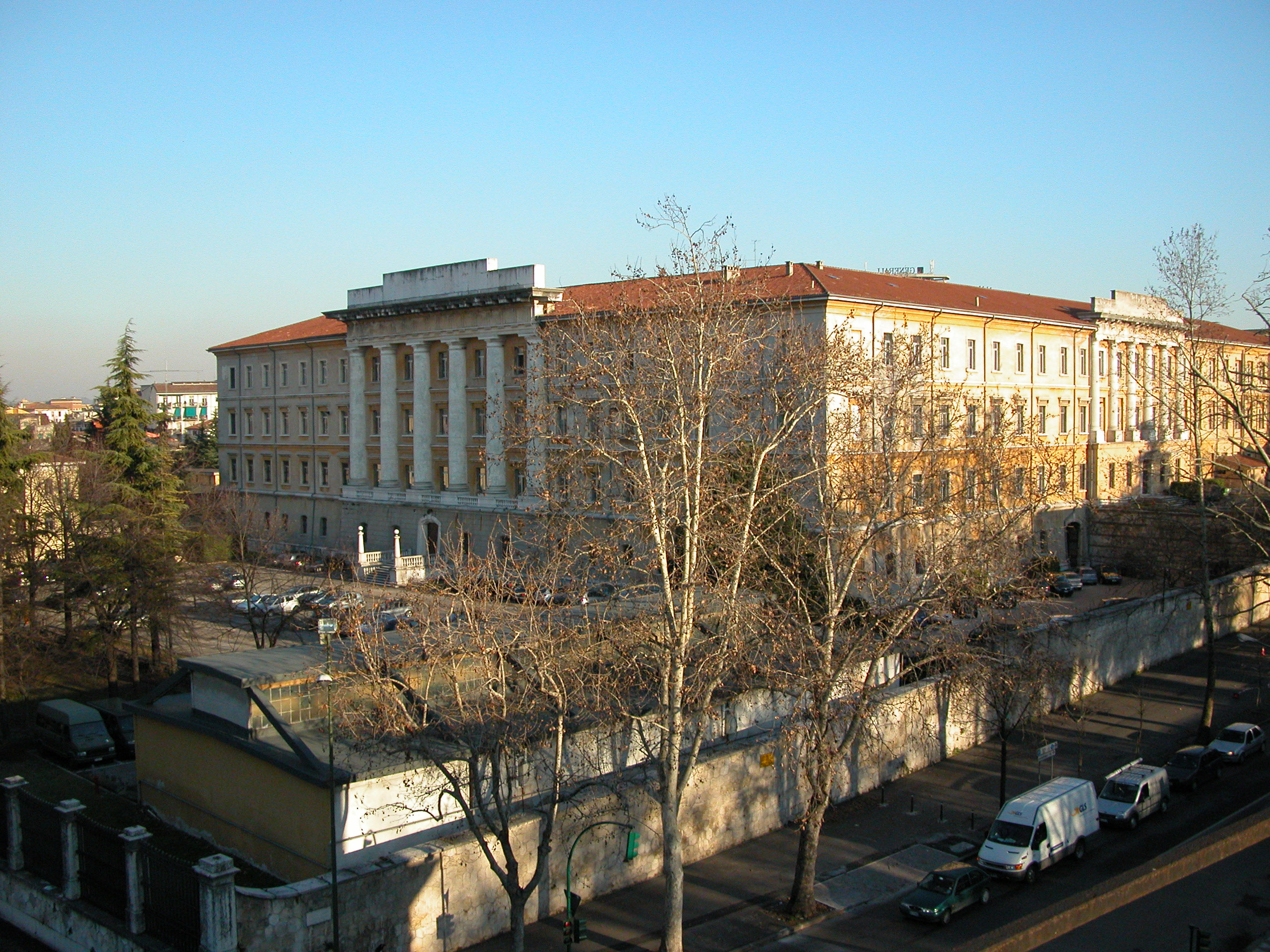
The Holy Spirit Hospital, characterized by its imposing giant-order colonnade facing along Porta Palio Street, was capable of accommodating up to 2,000 patients and met the most up-to-date rules of hygiene and medical science

Following the principles of nineteenth-century military town planning, it was consequently chosen to distinguish military buildings into two classes, namely, military buildings and establishments required for the exclusive needs of the stronghold and those aimed at the general needs of the army, with a supply of periodically renewed grain and hay reserves, which was capable of feeding the entire army on the battlefield without burdening the civilian community with requisitions or depredations.

Specifically, for the first group of priorities, the following were built: the infantry and cavalry barracks; the supply establishments with related warehouses and various stores for provisions; the mounts establishments, with related warehouses and stores of clothing for soldiers and harnesses for horses; buildings and other establishments for fortress artillery; fortifications yard, in which all materials and equipment for the work of the engineers were kept, related warehouses and stores, with workshops and rooms for storing fire-fighting equipment. Furthermore, the garrison hospital, the stronghold command and the commander's residence with related personnel for the stronghold command, military justice, chaplain and military commissar; the directorate of engineering, with offices for engineer officers and technical construction personnel, and with the director's quarters; and finally the prisons were built.

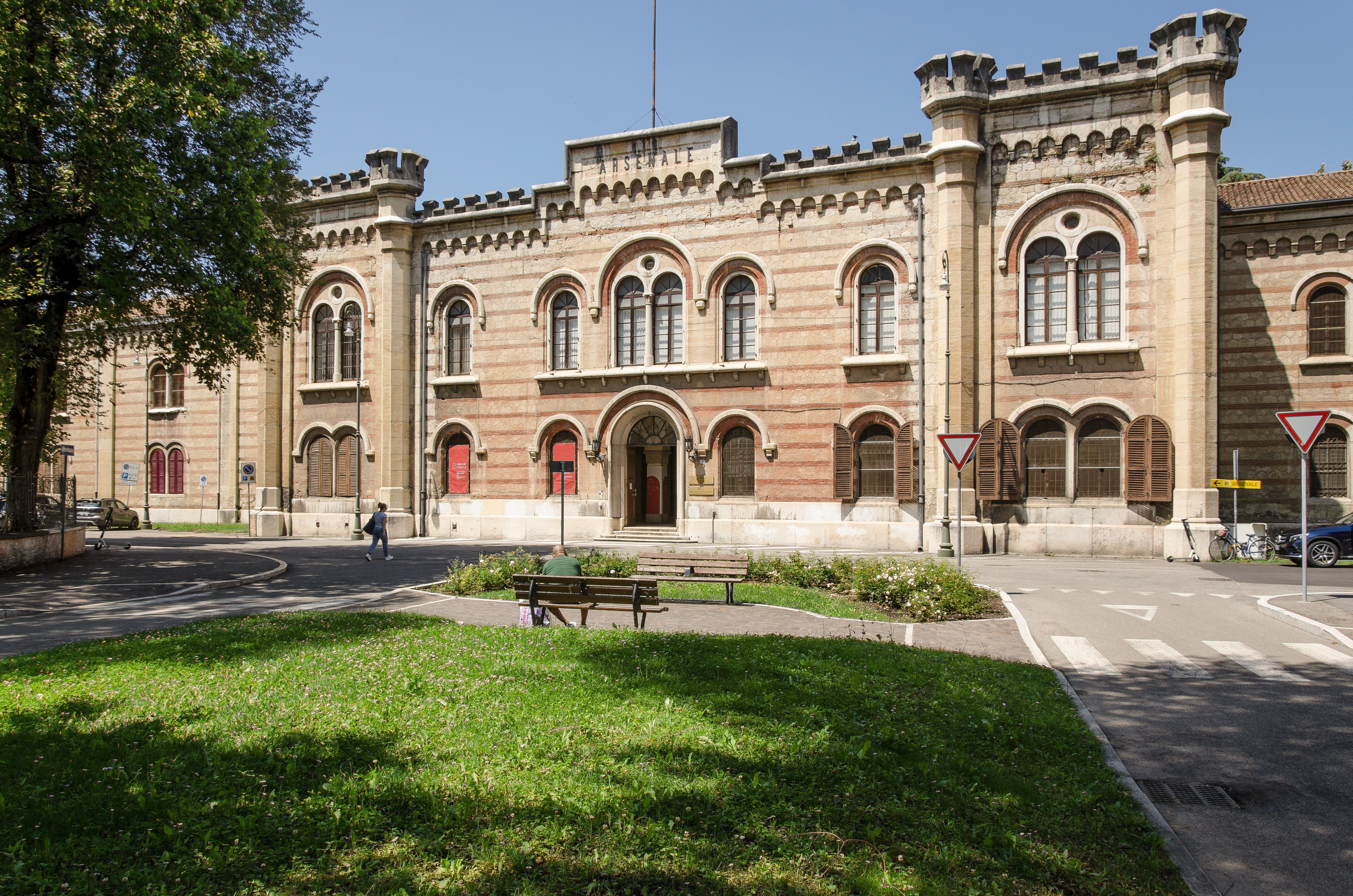
The command pavilion of the artillery arsenal of the Campagnola: built between 1854 and 1861 on the model of the Viennese one, it extended over 62000 m^{2} on which 10 buildings were built for warehouses and workshops

For the general needs of the army, the following were completed: a provision establishment with regard to the wartime supply of the army; buildings and establishments for the country artillery; the pioneer barracks, with warehouses and depots for bridge equipment; warehouses and depots for the siege artillery park, with associated equipment and materials, as well as barracks for artillery and engineer troops assigned to siege operations; a large army hospital; warehouses and depots for accompanying equipment; large production arsenals with foundries and drill benches.

Thus, in more than fifty years of Austrian rule, more than fifty buildings or complexes of buildings were built, representing a rare repertoire of a specialized genre of architecture, with distinctive types and forms and with works newly erected or inherited from the past. The larger structures, built from scratch - most notably the Campone barracks, the Castel San Pietro barracks, the Campagnola artillery arsenal, the Santo Spirito hospital, and the Santa Marta barracks - went to fill in spaces interposed between the curtain wall and the urbanized territory, which had remained empty for centuries, or to occupy prominent positions in the urban landscape, visible from all over the city.

These buildings, instead of taking on aspects that could symbolize the strength of the occupying monarchy, went to blend in with pre-existing architecture: the Scaliger genius loci thus converged with the Rundbogenstil, resulting in new buildings designed in the style of Romantic, Neo-Romanesque or Neo-Gothic historicism. The results obtained are due to the workers of the Imperial Royal Office of the Fortifications of Verona, cultured designers who were trained for the most part at the Genie Akademie in Vienna: they showed themselves to be attentive to grasping the peculiarities of the place in which they worked, as well as connoisseurs of medieval and Renaissance Veronese architecture, whose qualities they understood. Probably the reference to elements of the city's language, with results that were far from obvious, was felt necessary by the designers, since through the recognizability of these stylistic features the integration of the otherwise "foreign" structures would be established.

=== Barracks ===
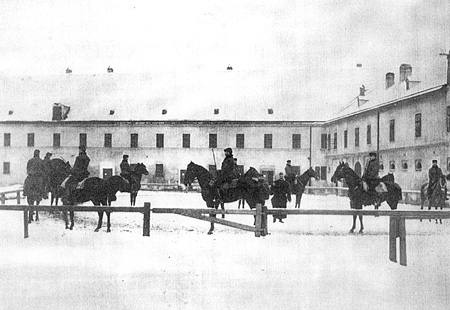
One of the two barracks at Campone, built between 1844 and 1850, which could accommodate a thousand soldiers each as well as 370 horses

In the architecture of the nineteenth-century barracks, the high technical and artistic level of the design of the Habsburg officials can be recognized: attentive to functionality, to the salubriousness of the interiors, and to the right economy in construction, they nevertheless succeeded in asserting a monumental figurative character, of civilian representation, with solutions inferred from the stylistic orientations proper to the time.

Two interventions were the most prominent for their technical and artistic significance. The first is the great complex of the Campone, consisting of the body of the building equipped with 185 rooms for infantry and 251 rooms for cavalry, which in 1841 initiated the impressive cycle of Habsburg military buildings in the city; this was an exemplary intervention, which has its direct architectural antecedent in the late 18th-century barracks in the classical style of the Bohemian stronghold of Theresienstadt.

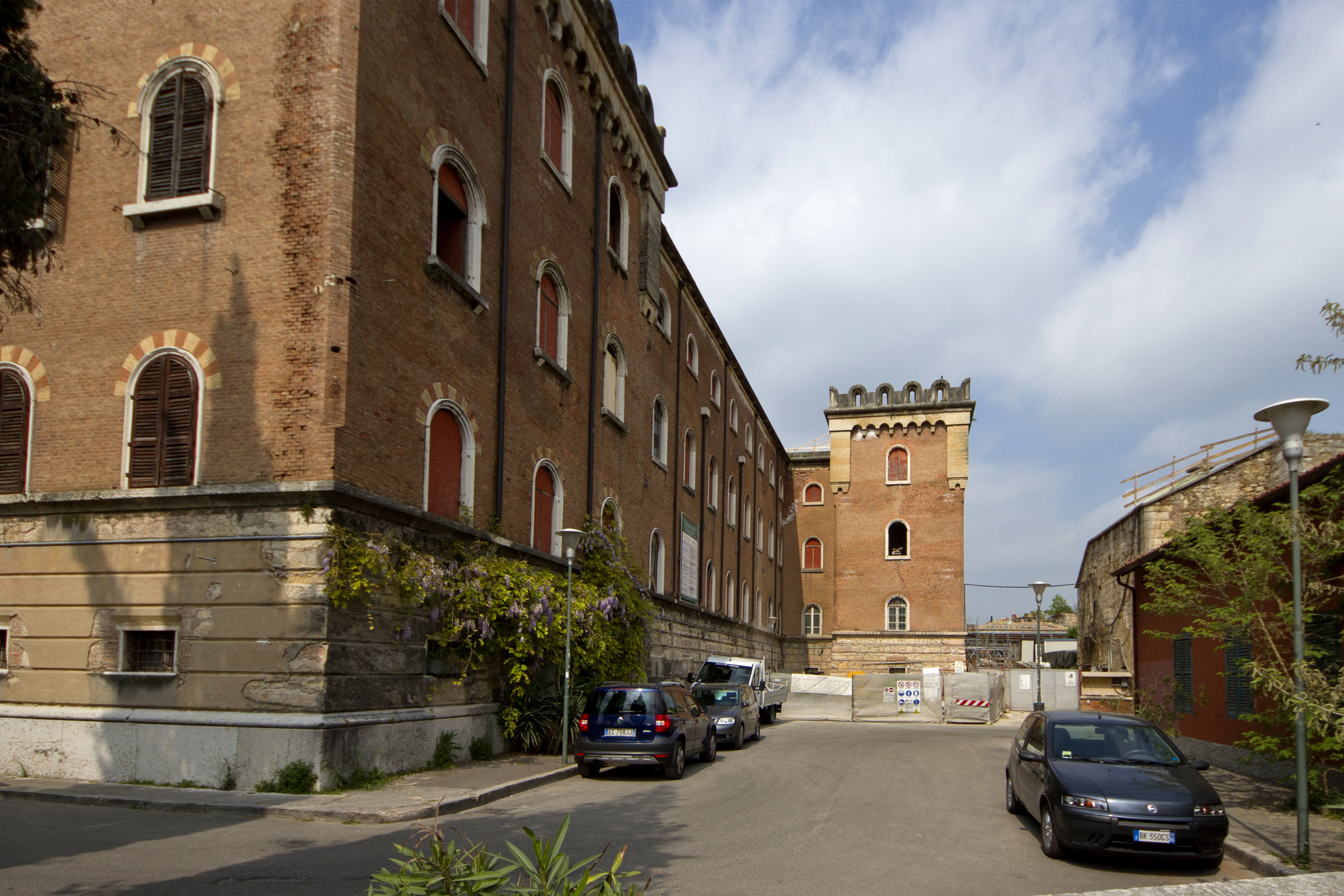
The rear front of the Castel San Pietro barracks, containing as many as 87 vast rooms

Also of singular interest is the Castel San Pietro barracks, for infantry with artillery detachment, built between 1854 and 1856 on the ruins of the Visconti castle and the church of San Pietro: it was its architecture that introduced the new Rundbogenstil style to Verona. Situated on the hill of the same name, the barracks became a scenic landmark and, at the same time, from its crenellated terrace roof, it is possible to observe the entire fortified city; given its panoramic position, the forecourt was equipped with 10 artillery pieces, which in case of need could strike the entire city, as, moreover, had already happened during the Veronese Easter by the Napoleonic forces.

In addition to the newly constructed Habsburg buildings, a conspicuous set of barracks can be identified in the religious buildings that were demanized by Napoleon Bonaparte as a result of legal measures in 1805-1806 and 1810, and intended for military use. The conversion to barracks and other services for the French army of thirteen churches and convent complexes made it possible to cope with the new urban dimension of the military function imposed on the city by a large standing army. After 1814, the same buildings were mostly kept in the service of the imperial army, with subsequent functional adjustments, adaptations, or expansions.

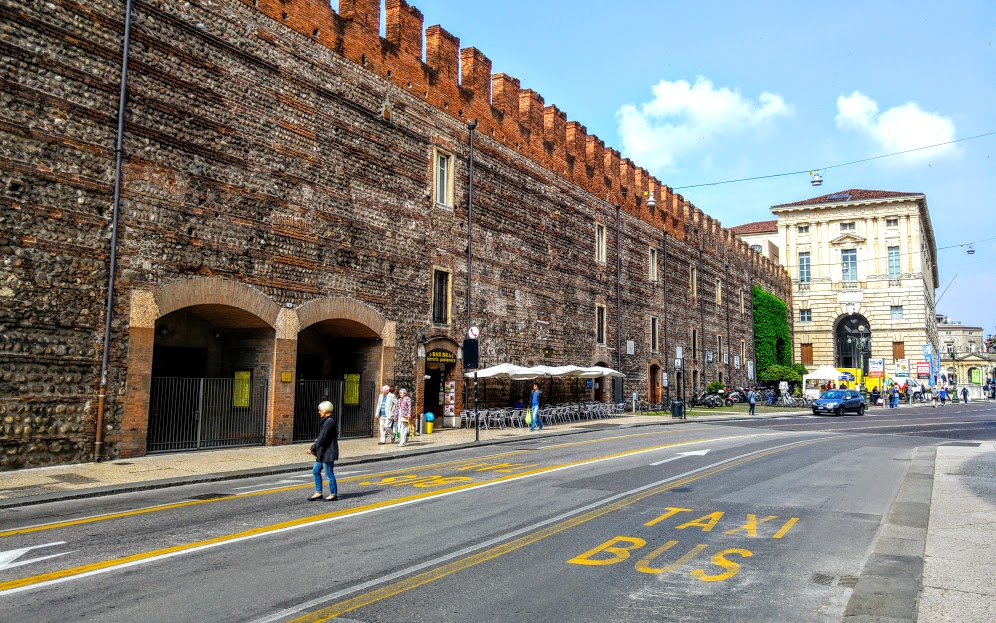
Verona's municipal walls, on which buildings intended to contain military barracks were built in adherence

Among the military buildings in the stronghold there is a set of special historical interest, since they had originated precisely for the purpose and had retained their original function for centuries. In the nineteenth century, the barracks built by the Republic of Venice in the second half of the sixteenth century to guard the city gates were still in use, with the perceived need for adaptation to the new military techniques, as was the Catena barracks, from the early seventeenth century, a remarkable example of the courtyard type, used at first as a military hospital and expanded over the years to 150 rooms. Another important military artifact was Castelvecchio, which had housed the school for artillery and engineer officers of the Serenissima and where the mathematician Antonio Maria Lorgna also taught; during Austrian rule it was used as a barracks, court, and military prison. Other barracks, perhaps of Visconti or fifteenth-century Venetian layout, constitute a set of special functional persistence and original architectural structure, a linear and continuous sequence of buildings located along the municipal-scaliger wall facing the Cittadella: adhering to the south side, toward the Adigetto, such military buildings succeed each other from the Adige to the Gran Guardia.

=== Magazines ===
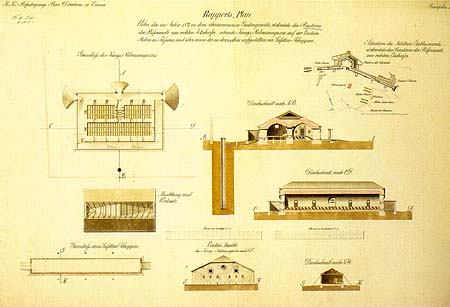
Planimetry, sections and elevations of the Riformati magazine, built between 1836 and 1837

For security issues, both wartime magazines, equipped with bomb-proof vaulting construction technology, and peacetime magazines, equipped with ordinary structure, were built in the stronghold. The location of the latter was relegated to the open countryside to preserve the city from devastation in the event of explosions due to lightning, fire or bombing. In the imminence of a conflict, however, the powders contained in them had to be transferred inside the fortified city, to the wartime magazines; these were then covered with a bomb-proof vaulted structure, that is, one capable of resisting enemy artillery strikes in the event of siege or bombardment.

The architectural layout of the Veronese magazines exemplifies the type of the nineteenth-century Habsburg magazine, derived from the powder warehouses devised in the seventeenth and eighteenth centuries: these are buildings with a longitudinal, rectangular plan, with a single or double nave, covered by a barrel vault with overlying earth-covering mass in the case of the bomb-proof structure. So-called Bohemian (hemispherical) vaults, without earth-covering mass, were instead put in place in peacetime magazines with ordinary building structure. The side walls, on the inside, are often articulated into arched niches, the piers of which act as buttresses for the horizontal thrusts of the covering vaults.

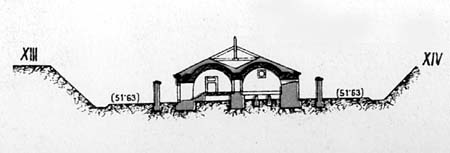
Project section of the Campo Marzo magazine, built in 1837

Small windows with metal doors and various ventilation intakes, with broken-track pass-through, ensured the necessary lighting and natural air circulation as well as security against the intrusion of incendiary substances. Internal salubriousness, required for the preservation of dust, was perfected by the wooden-framed floor, detached from the ground, with an underlying ventilated chamber communicating with the perimeter ventilation intakes.

In addition to the magazines, several other pyrotechnic workshops were also set up intra moenia. A "laboratory" consisting of eight bodies of buildings within which the packaging of cartridges, artillery cartridges, and the casting of rifle bullets was carried out was located near the San Bernardino monastery complex; more delicate operations took place instead in protected rooms within the adjacent San Bernardino bastion. A second pyrotechnic laboratory was located southeast of the military hospital, a short distance from the bastions of Santo Spirito and Riformati, where, within a large enclosed area, the loading of mine cartridges and artillery cartouches took place. A final workshop, planned but not completed because the Campone barracks were built in its place, was to be built near the Holy Trinity and St. Francis bastions and was to consist of nine buildings.

=== Infrastructure ===
The role assumed by the city in the strategic context of Lombardy-Veneto also affected the development of the main infrastructures built, especially the road routes and the railway.

Especially the construction of the Ferdinandea railroad brought with it certain risks related to the passage of the line in the vicinity of the magistral walls as well as related to the defense of the route: even if the railroad route was not built for military purposes, it could assume strong relevance in case of war. Precisely for this reason, the project planner Giovanni Milani had to discuss the planning of the route with a mixed commission, composed of a significant proportion of army representatives: in addition to the provincial delegate Baron De Pauli and the director of the Office of Public Construction Matteis, it included Colonel Hlavaty, director of the Imperial Royal Office of Fortifications, and Captain of the General Staff Huyon.

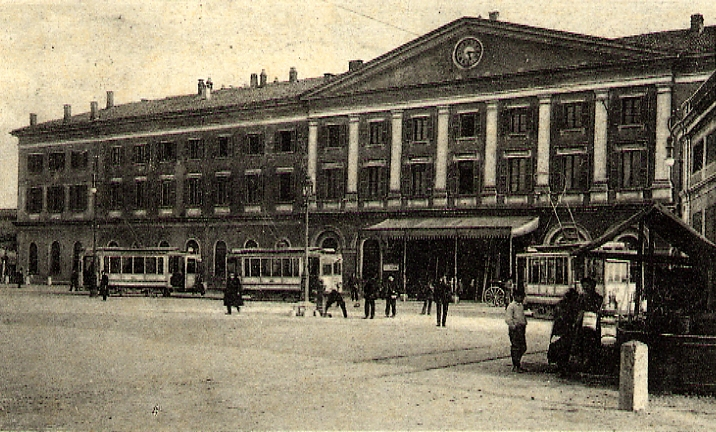
The Porta Vescovo station in an early 20th century photograph

Among the problems that the commission had to face was in particular the construction of the Porta Vescovo station, to be built a short distance from the military gate of the same name, and the route that proceeded from it, past the Adige on a railway bridge, to the minor stop of Porta Nuova, near, on the other hand, the Sammichelian gate: this route came dangerously close to the walls, so much so that at the height of the Campo Marzo bastion it was only a hundred meters from them. Such a route therefore required a strengthening of the defenses and some protective works.

The main one concerned the large Porta Vescovo station, with its various service buildings and works, since it interfered with the artillery of the bastioned fronts that ran from the Santa Toscana allure to the Campo Marzo bastion; moreover, in case of war, enemies could take the station and establish an offensive stronghold there against the city. Between 1857 and 1859 this disadvantage was remedied by enclosing the entire station complex with a fortified enclosure, ordered for gun defense, equipped with three large casemate caponiers for flanking the long sides of the enclosure by artillery shots.

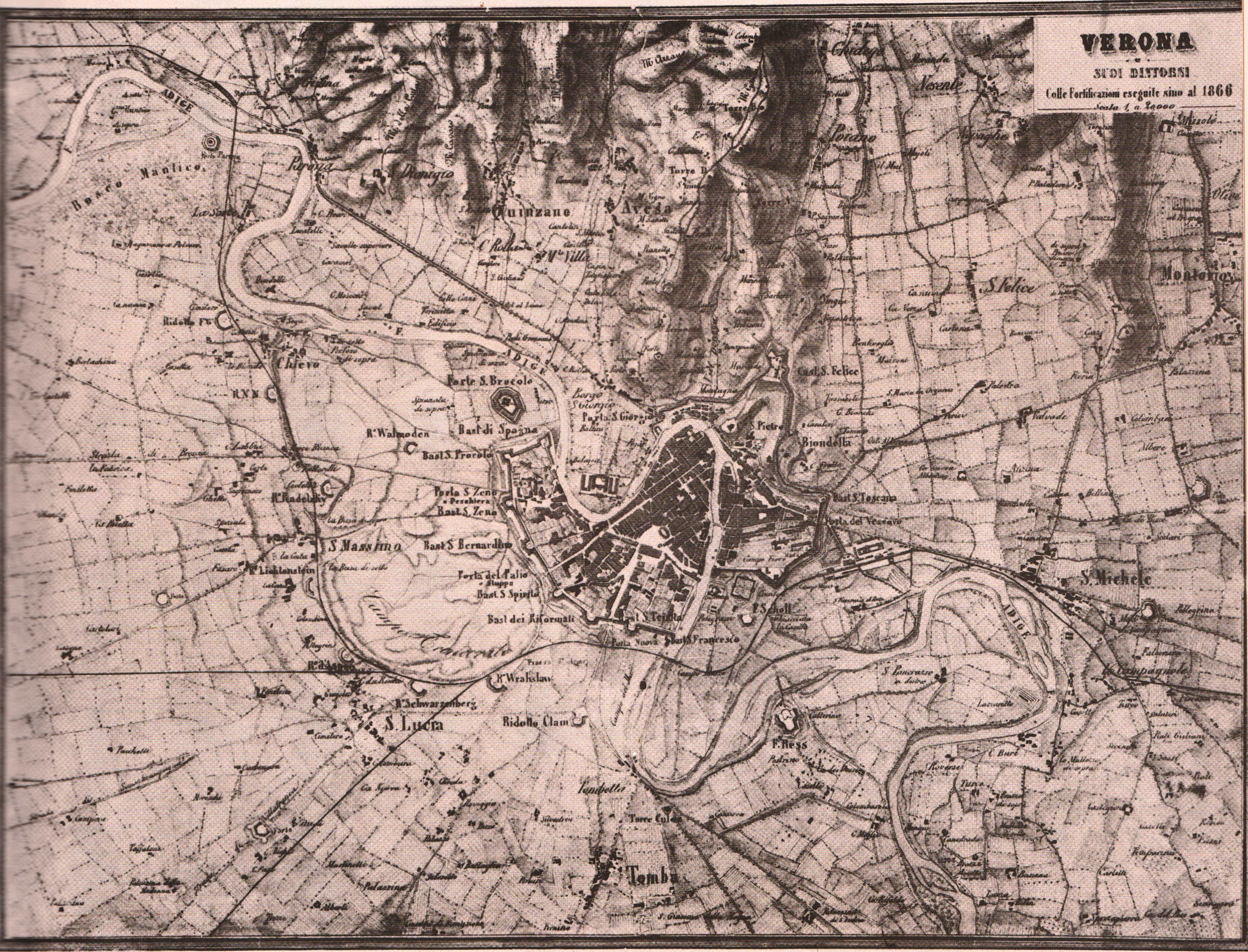
Verona and its surroundings in 1866: railway lines, postal roads, and detached fortifications are visible

The First Italian War of Independence highlighted the tactical importance of the railway, which was largely damaged by the war operations, being unusable: in a few months, under the supervision of engineer Luigi Negrelli, the connection between Venice and Vicenza, where the section ended at the time, was restored, and it was possible to extend it as far as Verona, so that vehicles and men could be moved with decisive promptness. When the conflict ended, it was therefore decided to extend the railway line to the other fortresses of the Quadrilatero: in 1851 the Mantua section was completed; in 1853 Peschiera was connected, for continuation to Milan; and finally in 1858 work on the Verona-Trento link was completed.

Work on the road infrastructure was also significant, as the movement of troops, supplies and connections between fortresses had to take place on quick and easy routes. For these needs, in addition to the maintenance of post roads connecting neighboring towns, efforts were made to build new driveways for military use, some of which were also accessible to civilians, the design, construction and maintenance of which was entrusted to the k.k. Genie Direktion Verona. In particular, these reached an extension of almost 100 km, most of them (about 52) built around Verona.

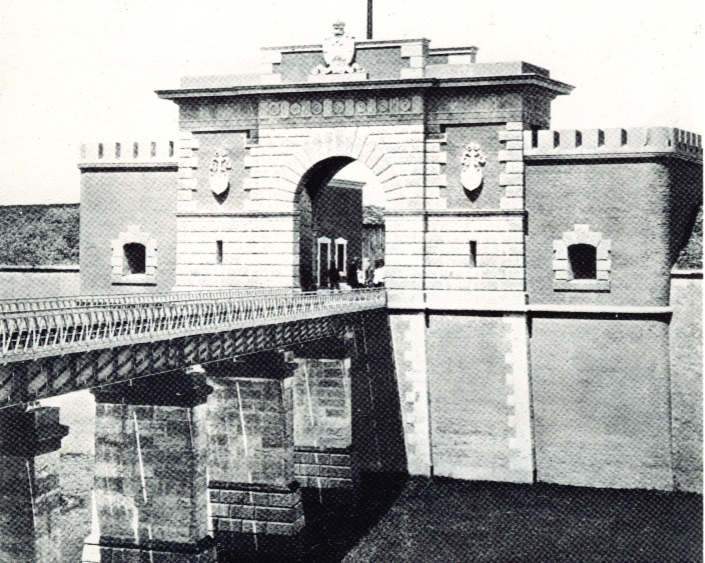
Country side view of Campofiore Gate in 1863, showing the railroad bridge

Fundamental from an urban planning point of view turned out to be the construction of the outer and inner ring-roads of the magisterial enclosure having a development of more than 11 km, with the 25 gates connecting the two (of which only 10 could be used by civilians, which were in any case manned). This double system allowed a fast and protected connection for soldiers and supplies, including war material. Since the magazines on the ramparts had a limited reserve, it was important to allow easy access to the four larger magazines and the artillery workshop.

Of the major gateways, Porta Nuova, Porta Vescovo, and Porta San Giorgio had to be partially renovated, while two were built from scratch: Porta Vittoria, designed by Giuseppe Barbieri and built in 1838 to allow easier access to the new monumental cemetery, the medieval gate of the same name having been closed in 1818 and the Aleardi bridge not yet built; Porta di Campofiore, built during the last years of Austrian rule to allow the transit of military trains heading to the military area of Campo Fiore, where the Santa Marta factories were located.

Finally, for the rapid connection of the square with the main forts of the defense system, a long-distance communication system was installed, namely a series of optical telegraphs. Dispatches were transmitted by means of Morse code and a "flash of color" system during the day and "flash of light" at night; sent from the keep of Castelvecchio to Fort San Mattia, on the hill of the same name overlooking the city, from there they were repeated to the other forts. When the atmosphere was sufficiently clear, moreover, it was possible to transmit the same dispatches to the forts of the Rivoli and Pastrengo group, or even to the fortresses of Peschiera and Mantua. This optical system underwent a gradual conversion with the addition of electromagnetic apparatus, reporting to a central station installed in the Campone barracks and operated by a specialized department of the Engineer Corps.

== Consequences for the local economy ==
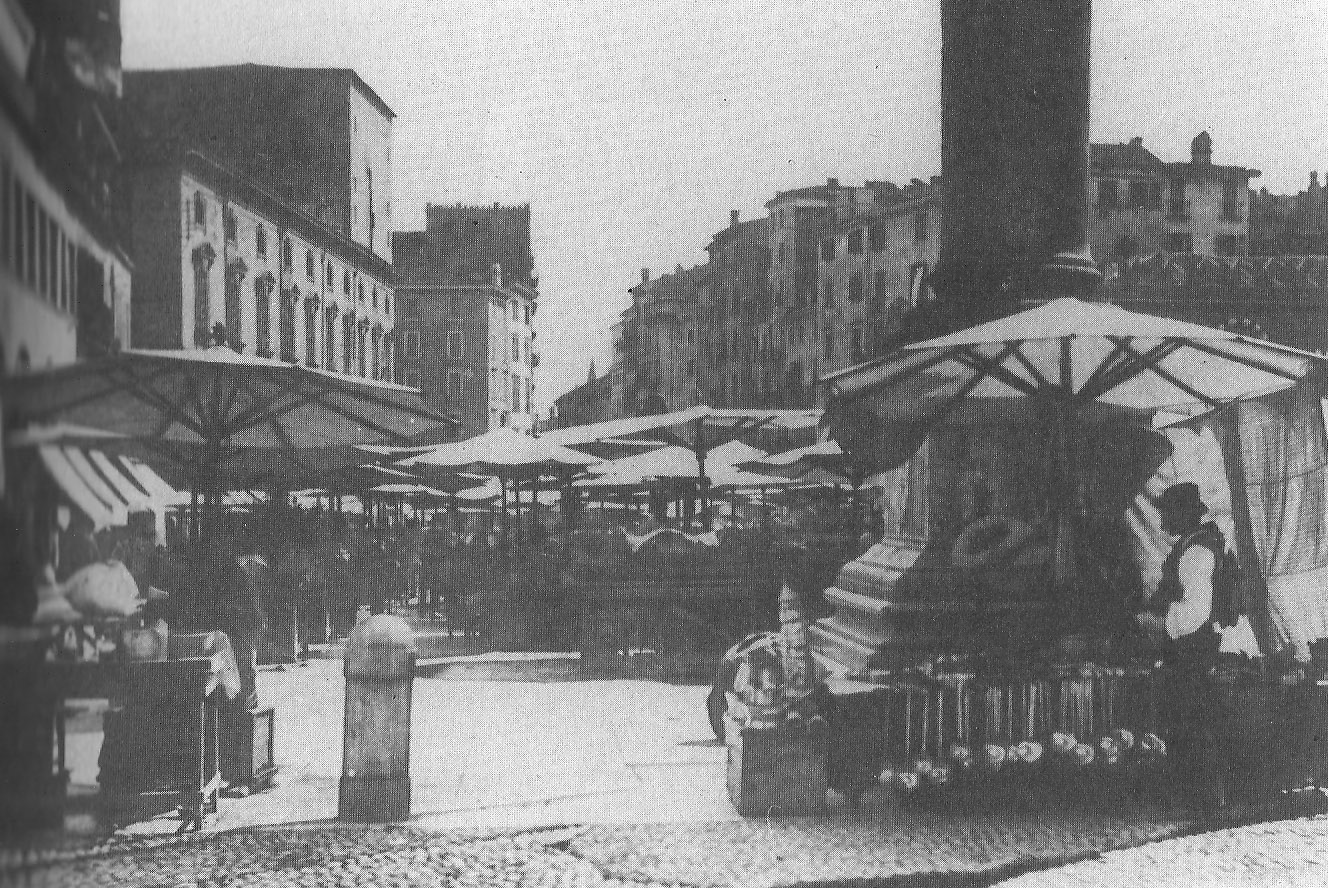
The market in Piazza delle Erbe in the mid-nineteenth century

The effects of such a high military presence in the city were naturally seen on the economic component as well. The historiography of the Risorgimento gave a negative view of that aspect, considering the building sector unimportant and emphasizing the difficulties of the manufacturing sector, more likely related to the increase in taxation and the diseases that affected the grapevine and the silkworm. Instead, it seems more likely, from the evidence of the period, that business increased considerably and that there was widespread prosperity.

Construction was one of the leading sectors, as the imperial garrison needed a whole range of services and works related to the construction, restoration, maintenance and preservation of all structures intended for military use. One of the main contractors was the Veronese Luigi Trezza, to whom the military entrusted construction sites, even of considerable importance, the largest of which was the construction of the "Franz Josef I" artillery arsenal, the estimated cost of which as of 1854 was as much as 2821500 Austrian liras. He was not, however, the only one to benefit from this situation: if in 1836 there were only 13 building contractors in Verona, by 1852 this had reached the considerable figure of 42 firms.

The real estate market also underwent a revolution, both to meet the housing needs of soldiers and the need for office space. Renting became a particularly lucrative practice for private individuals (but there was also greater income for the contractors who carried out the housing renovations and for the artisans and merchants who supplied the furnishings): officers, coming mostly from noble families, sought housing suited to their needs and status; lower-ranking soldiers often found placement by landlords or in private lodgings or premises; finally, many properties were rented out to meet the need for offices and barracks.

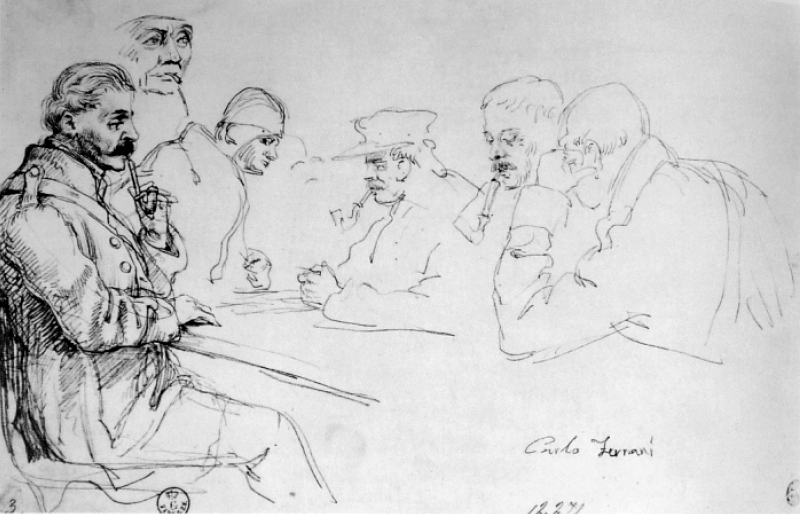
Austrian soldiers at the café in a drawing by Carlo Ferrari. Their presence had become a characteristic feature in nineteenth-century Verona

In addition to housing, soldiers also needed basic necessities, clothing and accessories, thus contributing to the enrichment of town merchants. Within a few years, places of entertainment increased considerably in number, in a far greater proportion than the growth of the civilian population: from 1822 to 1861, distilleries, cafes, taverns, inns, hotels and billiard halls grew from 466 to 559 establishments.

However, there was no shortage of negative effects, especially related to the vast area subject to military servitude surrounding the city. This entailed a number of restrictions, including: a ban on approaching fortified works; limits on transit on some military roads; and the impossibility of building or planting tall trees in the so-called "esplanade," a large area used for militia exercises. There could, however, be exceptions to the latter limitation; in particular, it was possible to plant vines consisting of trees with a maximum height of 120 cm, and in the case of repeated requests, following inspections by the Engineer Corps, building permits could be granted.

Nevertheless, the structures had to be temporary in nature since, in the event of an ordinance, the owner had a 48-hour window to provide for the demolition of the building. These restrictions, which persisted beyond 1866, also prevented the city's industrial and commercial development outside the walls. The first industrialization of Verona therefore concerned the "Basso Acquar" area, which, being located in a depressed area near the Adige River, did not unduly disturb the contours of the land and the action of military works.

== List of military structures ==
Verona's fortifications as of 1866, with the magisterial wall and the outer entrenched camp highlighted: Hilly forts and advanced lowland forts (1837 – 1843) First entrenched camp (1848 – 1856) Second entrenched camp (1859 – 1866)

=== Magisterial belt ===
==== Gates of entry ====
- Porta San Zeno
- Porta Palio
- Porta Nuova
- Porta Vittoria
- Porta Vescovo
- Porta di Campofiore
- Porta San Giorgio

==== Defenses on the right side of the Adige River ====
- Bastion of St. Francis
- Bastion of the Holy Trinity
- Bastion of the Reformed
- Bastion of the Holy Spirit
- Bastion of San Bernardino
- Bastion of San Giuseppe
- Bastion of San Zeno
- Bastion of San Procolo
- Bastion of Spain
- Half Bastion of the Upper Chain

==== Defenses on the left side of the Adige River ====
- Pellegrini Battery
- Bastion of Campo Marzo
- Maddalene Bastion
- Allure of Santa Toscana
- Counterscarp battery XXII
- Scarp Battery XXI
- Allure of San Zeno in Monte
- Allure of the Cave
- San Felice Castle
- Allure of the Baccola
- Allure of the Boccare
- Allure of San Giorgio
- Ravelin of San Giorgio

=== Entrenched camps ===
==== Hilly forts and advanced lowland forts ====
- Maximilian Towers
- Fort Sofia
- Fort San Leonardo
- Fort San Mattia
- Fort Biondella
- Fort Gazometro (demolished)
- Fort San Procolo

==== First entrenched camp ====
- Fort Chievo
- Fort White Cross (demolished)
- Fort Spianata (demolished)
- Fort San Zeno
- Fort San Massimo (demolished)
- Fort Fenilone (ruins)
- Fort Santa Lucia (demolished)
- Fort Palio (demolished)
- Fort Porta Nuova (demolished)
- Torre Tombetta (demolished)
- Fort Santa Caterina
- Fort San Michele (demolished)

==== Second entrenched camp ====
- Fort Parona (ruins)
- Fort Lugagnano
- Fort Dossobuono
- Fort Azzano
- Fort Tomba (ruins)
- Fort Cà Vecchia (demolished)
- Fort Cà Bellina (demolished)
- Fort Preara

=== Establishments and barracks ===
- Artillery arsenal of the Campagnola
- St. Thomas garrison prison
- Barracks of castel San Pietro
- Catena barracks
- Campone barracks
- Engineering Directorate of Saint Lucia
- San Bernardino fireworks workshop (ruins)
- Garrison hospital of Santo Spirito
- Catering establishment of Santa Marta
- Catering establishment of Santa Caterina da Siena
- Artillery establishment at the Riformati (demolished)

== See also ==
- Quadrilatero
- Verona
- Kingdom of Lombardy–Venetia
- Verona Arsenal

== Bibliography ==
- Bozzetto, Lino Vittorio; Perbellini, Gianni (1990). Verona: la piazzaforte ottocentesca nella cultura europea. Verona: Cassa di Risparmio di Verona Vicenza Belluno e Ancona. ISBN 88-85274-00-5.
- Conforti Calcagni, Annamaria (2005). Le mura di Verona. Caselle di Sommacampagna: Cierre. ISBN 88-8314-008-7.
- Ferrari, Maria Luisa (2009). "Verona piazzaforte d'Armata del Lombardo-Veneto. Le opere strategiche e le infrastrutture". In Savorra, Massimiliano; Zucconi, Guido (eds.). Città & Storia. Spazi e cultura militare nelle città dell'Ottocento (2 ed.). Roma: Università Roma Tre. ISSN 1828-6364.
- Jacobacci, Vittorio (1986). La piazzaforte di Verona sotto la dominazione austriaca 1814-1866. Verona: Cassa di Risparmio di Verona Vicenza e Belluno.
- Marinelli, Orietta (2001). "L'architettura militare austriaca". In Marinelli, Sergio (ed.). L'Ottocento a Verona. Cinisello Balsamo: Silvana Editoriale. ISBN 978-88-8215-364-9.
