= Torricelle =

Hills that enclose the city of Verona to the north

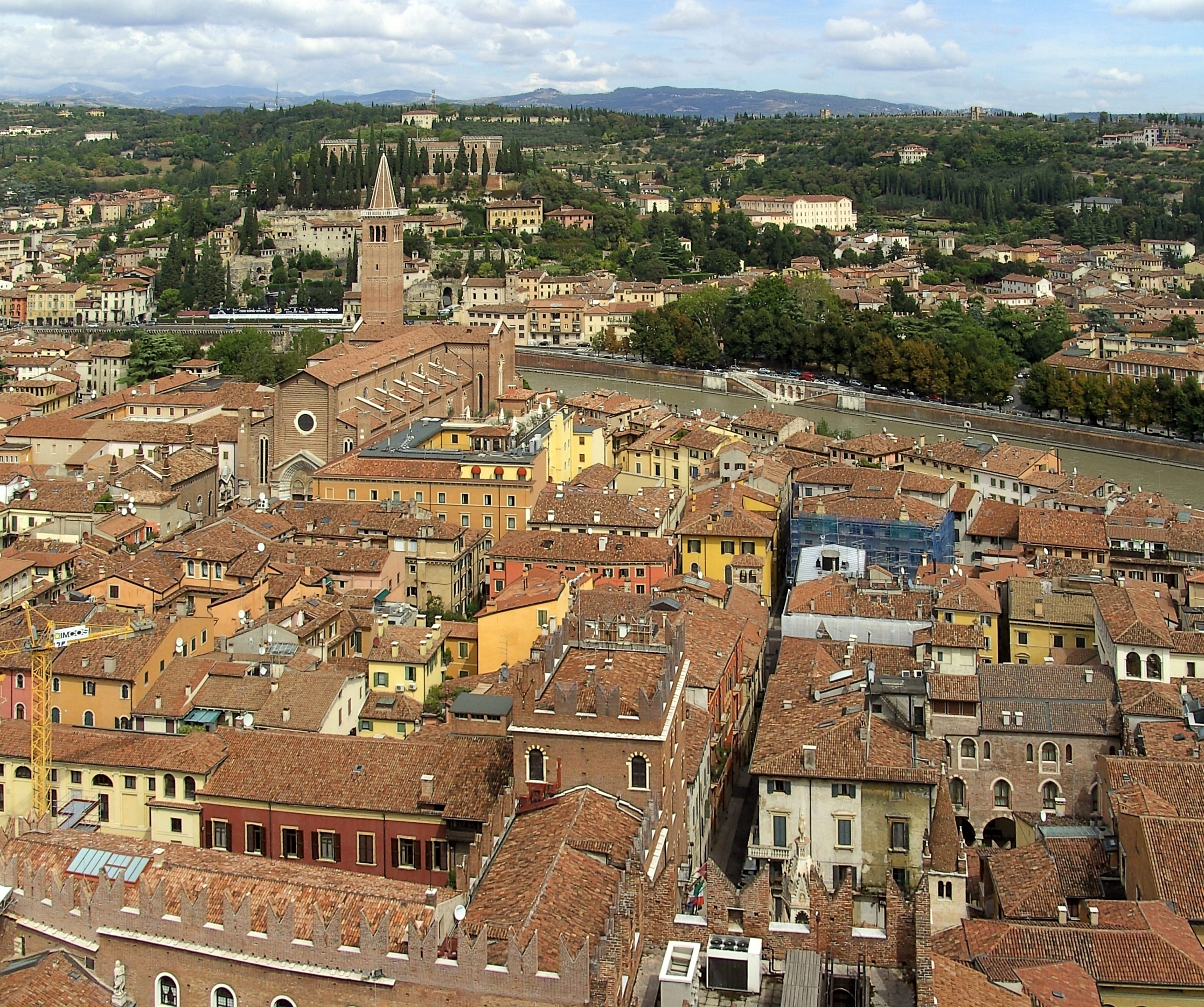
- View of the Torricelle from the Torre dei Lamberti

Highest point
- Elevation: 318 m (1,043 ft)
- Coordinates: 45°27′34″N 11°00′38″E

Geography
- Location within Italy

The Torricelle (Toresele in Veronese dialect) are the hills that surround the city of Verona to the north. The hills have been an integral part of the urban landscape since the founding of the city, whose first settlements in pre-Roman times saw the light of day on these very heights. From an orographic point of view, the Torricelle are the extreme southern offshoot of the Lessini Mountains included between Valpolicella and Valpantena; they therefore belong to the sector of the Venetian Prealps. In addition to various places of worship, villas and private homes, part of the Veronese city walls of the Scaligeri era are developed on the Torricelle, and various military fortifications built during the Austrian domination can still be found, which have become today a characteristic element of the Veronese hill and city landscape.

== Origins of the name ==
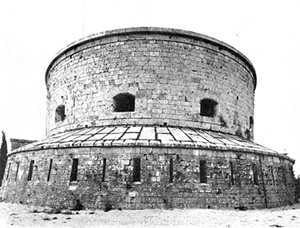
The Maximilian towers that give their name to the Torricelle free of vegetation in an old photograph.

The name by which the Veronese refer to the hills north of the city, Torricelle, is said to derive from the four Maximilian towers erected between 1837 and 1843 by Franz von Scholl, director of the Imperial Royal Office of Fortifications in Verona. The towers, which still exist, were built to enclose the complex hill defense system built by the Austrian Empire to the north: from there, artilleries could strike the Valpantena, Valdonega and the Avesa valley. The four round towers stand on the Santa Giuliana ridge and were at that time visible from the city, the vegetation being less dense, so much so that the Veronese called the entire hillside area by this name.

== Physical geography ==
=== Boundaries and landscape ===
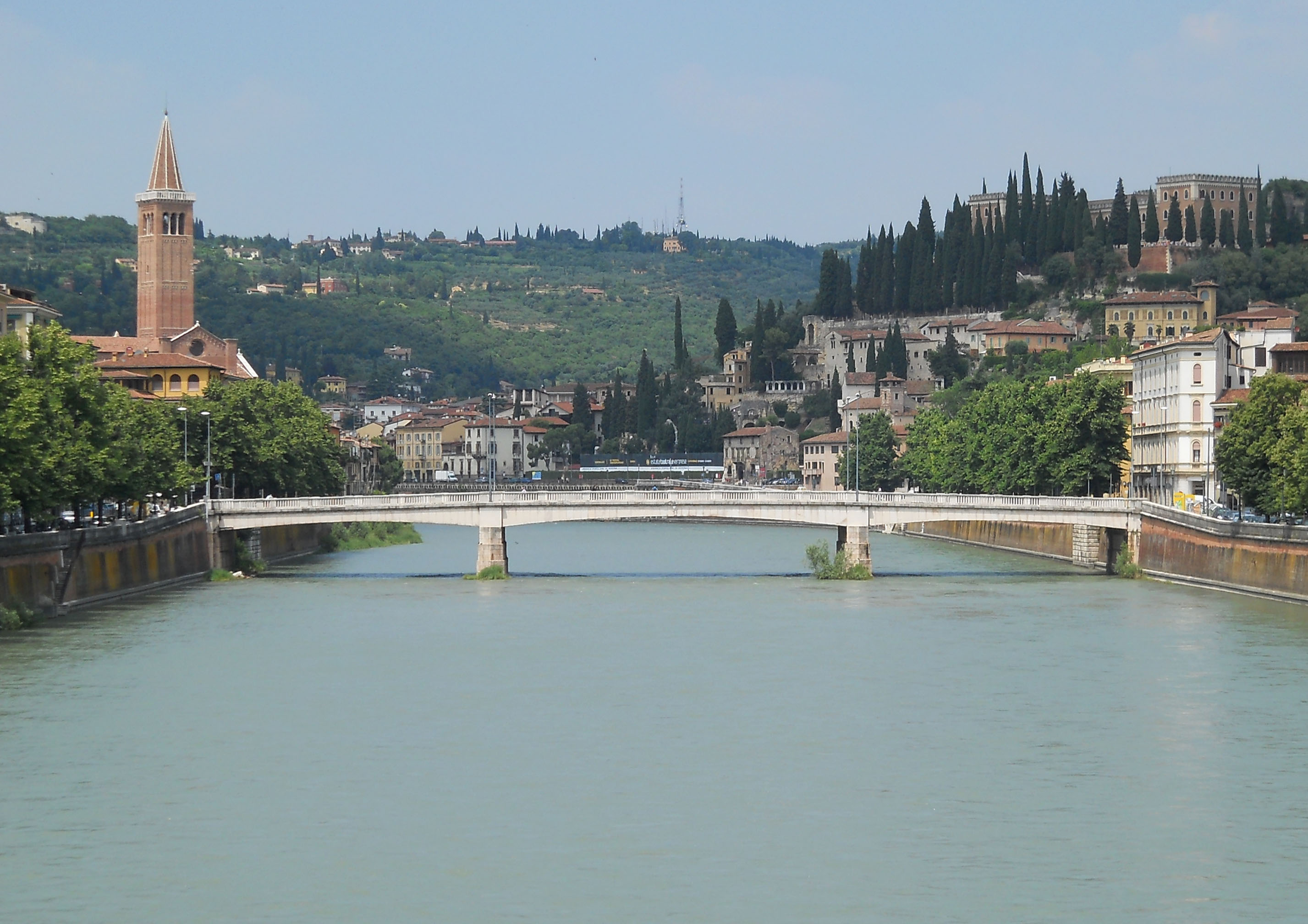
The Torricelle with San Pietro hill in the background of the Ponte Nuovo and the church of Santa Anastasia.

As difficult as it is to define a clear boundary between the hills north of Verona and the broader complex of the Lessini Mountains, the term Torricelle generally designates the hilly area located entirely within the municipal territory of Verona between Valpolicella to the west and Valpantena to the east, and more specifically the reliefs between the built-up area of Parona and the Borgo Venezia district. The area is divided into several cordons of hills that, starting from Monte Comun near Montecchio, fan out in a north-south direction towards the plain. As with the entire Lessinia, the reliefs are interspersed with narrow valleys, called vaj, crossed by streams, called "progni," that flow into the Adige River after crossing the city: their course is often silted up in the more densely urbanized neighborhoods.

Proceeding from west to east after the built-up area of Parona (a hamlet of Verona formerly included in Valpolicella), one encounters the hill of San Dionigi, Mount Cavro with the Hermitage of San Rocchetto, the Quinzano valley, Mount Villa, and Mount Ongarine, which separate the Quinzano valley from the Avesa valley, the Avesa valley traversed by various streams including the Borago and Lorì (which upstream divides into the Borago and Galina valleys, separated by Mt. Spigolo), Mt. Arzan dividing the Galina valley from the Valpantena, the hill of Santa Giuliana and Monte Calvo dominated by Fort San Mattia, and further south the Colle San Leonardo with the sanctuary of the Madonna of Lourdes, the Valdonega, the Colle San Felice and that of San Pietro (also known as Monte Gallo), where the first inhabitants of Verona settled, the valley of San Giovanni in Valle which houses the Romanesque church of the same name, and Monte Castiglione which separates the Veronetta district from the Biondella district and from the Valpantena, which closes the Torricelle area to the east.

The proximity of these valleys and hills to the city of Verona fostered their anthropization to the point where they became an integral part of the urban landscape, especially after the annexation of several autonomous municipalities in the hillside metropolitan belt (including Parona, Quinzano, and Avesa) to the City of Verona in 1927.

=== Geology ===
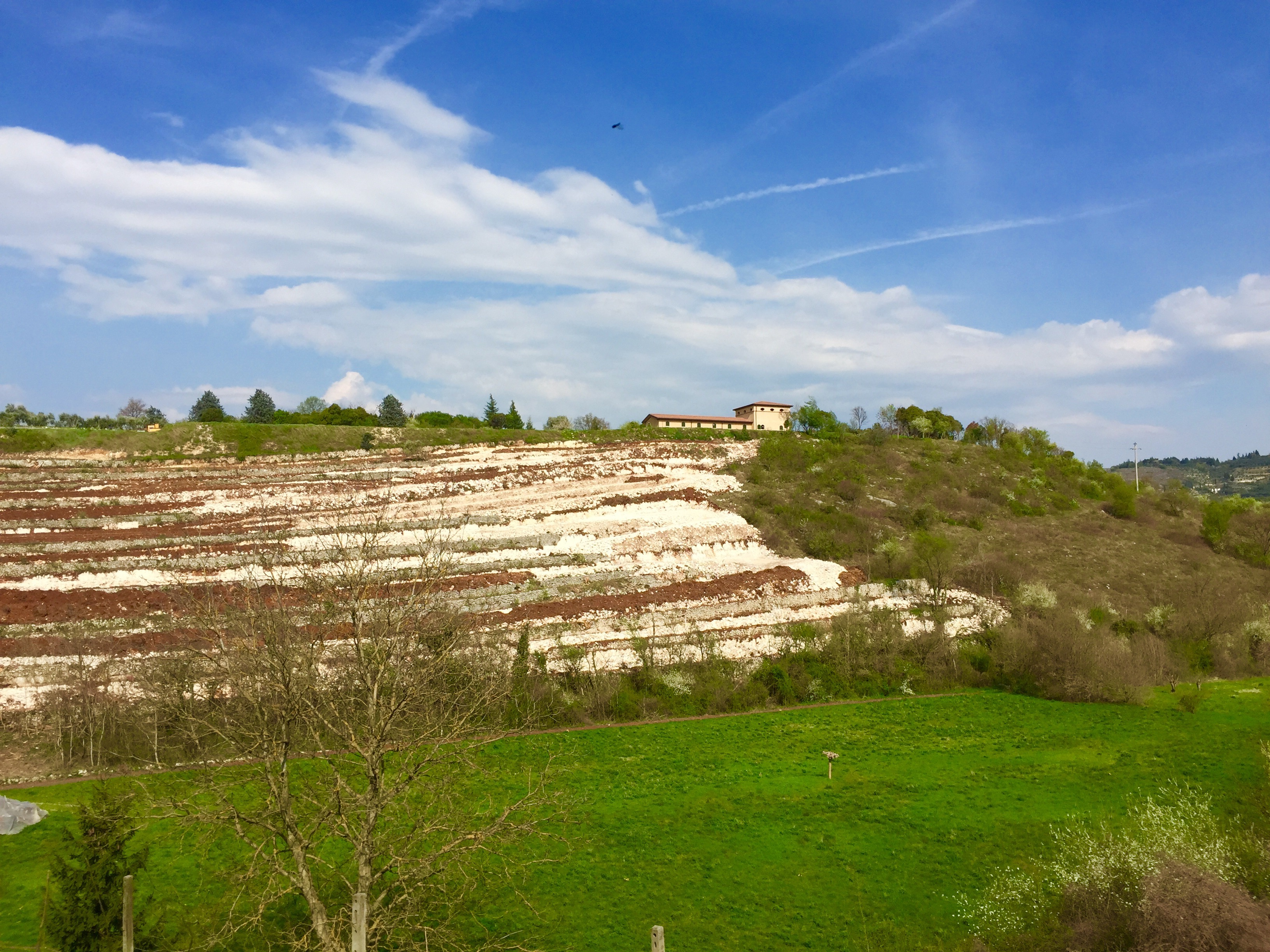
Tuff quarries in the hills near Avesa.

From a geological point of view, the Torricelle consists of limestone rocks whose date ranges from the Middle Eocene to the Upper Eocene. Like the nearby Lessini, this is a once submerged area whose emersion occurred between the Oligocene and lower Miocene. Paleokarst phenomena are present in the area, evident in the numerous cavities, caves, sinkholes, and underground tunnels, some inhabited since prehistoric times, and by streams flowing from karst springs. In the median belt, there are cores of igneous rocks: a basaltic seam crosses the Borago valley north of Avesa.

The valley area around Avesa has been affected in the past by intense mining of materials used in construction, such as Avesa Stone and Gallina Stone, the latter characterized by fossil deposits such as the better-known Veronese ammonitic red. Quarries, now abandoned, can still be seen on the sides of the Ongarine and Arzan mountains. The hills also yielded the so-called "yellow earth" of Verona, an ochre used for frescoes in the Renaissance period.

=== Hydrography ===
The Torricelle area has karst phenomena with surface streams of limited flow and intense subsurface water circulation. In the Avesa Valley, a foothill karst spring is the Lorì, a small watercourse that originates from resurgences near the hamlet and then develops its course only partially on the surface until it crosses underground the districts of Ponte Crencano and Borgo Trento and flows into the Adige near the Garibaldi Bridge. In Roman times, the waters of the Lorì were conveyed to the heart of the city through an aqueduct that crossed the Adige and continued to the Roman forum (today's Piazza Erbe).

The Avesa valley is also crossed by the Borago and Galina streams, which furrow their respective valleys north of the town to rejoin near Mount Spigolo in a single course. After crossing Avesa, the stream cuts through the Ponte Crencano neighborhood and flows into the Adige at the Ca' Rotta locality, not far from the Borgo Trento hospital.

To the west, the Quinzano valley is also crossed by a stream that, after cutting the hamlet in two, reaches the city near the locality Ca' di Cozzi and flows into the Adige at the height of Via Saval, just before the bridge of the same name.

A greater flow of water is found at the bottom of the valley where numerous water veils flow, including those of San Dionigi, Sommavalle, Valdonega, Fontana del Ferro, Castel San Pietro, the Roman theater, and San Giovanni in Valle.

=== Flora ===
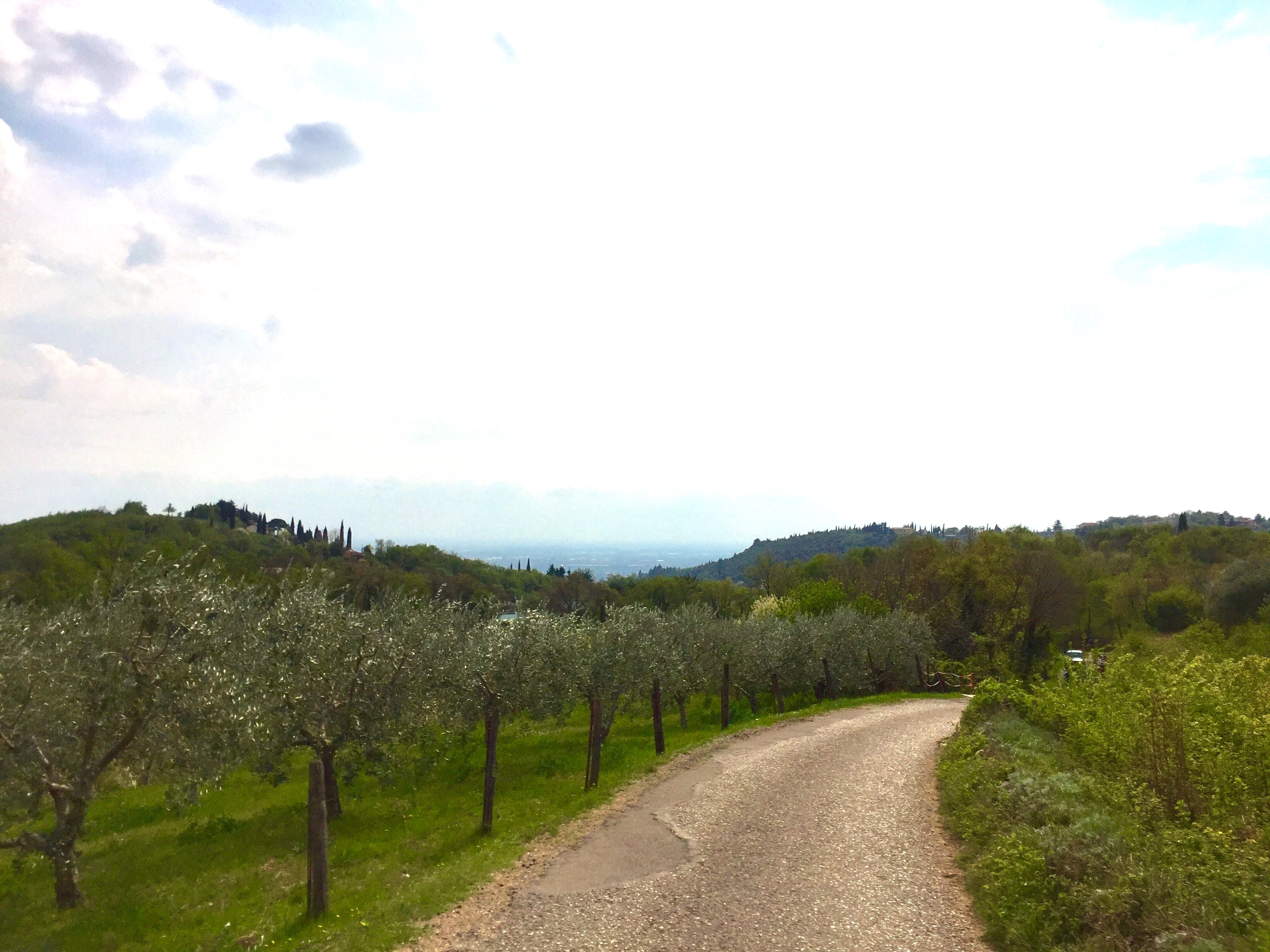
Olive trees between Avesa and Quinzano.

As with neighboring Valpolicella and Valpantena, the area's mild climate, sheltered from cold northern currents by the crown of the Lessini Mountains, has favored the cultivation of olives, vines, almond and cherry trees over the centuries. Typical of the man-made landscape are the terraces with dry stone walls spread on the hillsides, built over the centuries by man to facilitate cultivation (locally called marogne).

In wooded areas, the most common tree species are ash, downy oak and hornbeam. In wetter areas, however, European hornbeam and chestnut are encountered. There are also various coniferous species planted in more recent times (1950s) to curb erosion on hillsides with sparse vegetation: black pine, cypress, Aleppo pine, Atlas cedar, and stone pine.

=== Fauna ===
Vertebrate fauna includes:

- various species of mammals including hedgehog, common shrew, mole, cape hare, red squirrel, bank vole, European edible dormouse, hazel dormouse, striped field mouse, red fox, badger, weasel, and marten;
- amphibians such as the smooth newt, fire salamander, common toad, European green toad, tree frog, green frog, and agile frog;
- reptiles including the lizard, common wall lizard, slow worm, green whip snake, grass snake, smooth snake, and the asp viper;
- a hundred species of birds including the Eurasian blue tit, great tit, coal tit, nuthatch, jay, sparrowhawk, buzzard, hooded crow, chaffinch, cuckoo. In the bottom of the valley, kestrels, honey buzzards, ravens, and peregrine falcons are encountered. The golden eagle and eagle-owl have also been spotted. In olive groves the wryneck nests and hoopoe is often encountered.

The invertebrate fauna is characterized by various species typical of the Mediterranean region. Two endemic species are also present: the Niphargus canui, a groundwater amphipod crustacean that has its habitat in the Quinzano quarry "Il Busetto," and the Lathrobium pinkeri, an endogenous staphylinid beetle that lives in the Borago and Galina valleys.

== Main reliefs and places of interest ==
=== Hill of San Dionigi ===
A modestly sized hill between Parona and Quinzano, dominated by the medieval chapel of the same name flanked by the 19th-century villa Erbisti Rossi Chiampan, built in neoclassical forms in 1834 and surrounded by a 20th-century park with an artificial lake fed by springs in the area. The top of the hill can be reached from the Monti road, a side street of Via Preare, the provincial road leading from Verona to Parona.

=== Mount Cavro ===
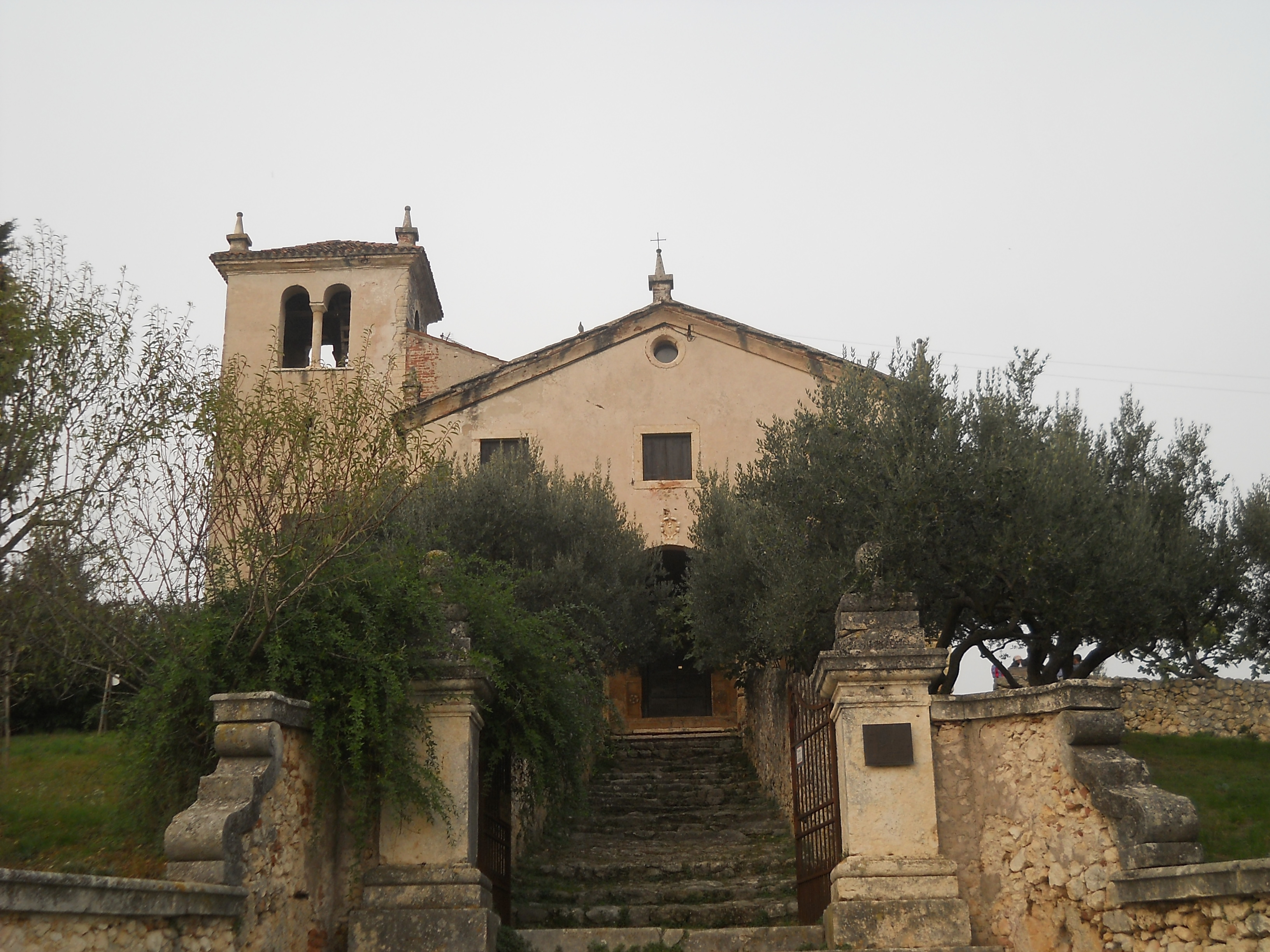
The hermitage of San Rocchetto on the summit of Mount Cavro.

The hill that overlooks the suburbs of Ca' di Cozzi and Saval and encloses the Quinzano valley to the west is overlooked by the hermitage of San Rocchetto, a small Romanesque-style church reached by an 18th-century staircase. The hill was attributed a religious connotation even in pre-Christian times: in the Bronze Age there was a hillfort on its summit, a place from which perhaps the sun and stars were divined. In medieval times, its peculiar shape led people to liken it to Mount Calvario, from which the present toponym would derive, and to erect three crosses on the summit. Between the 12th and 13th centuries, pilgrims from the Holy Land carved out of the rock a small chapel called the Holy Sepulcher on which the present church was later built in the 15th century. At the foot of the hill, on the other hand, stands the church of St. Roch, also erected in the late 15th century.

=== Monte di Villa ===
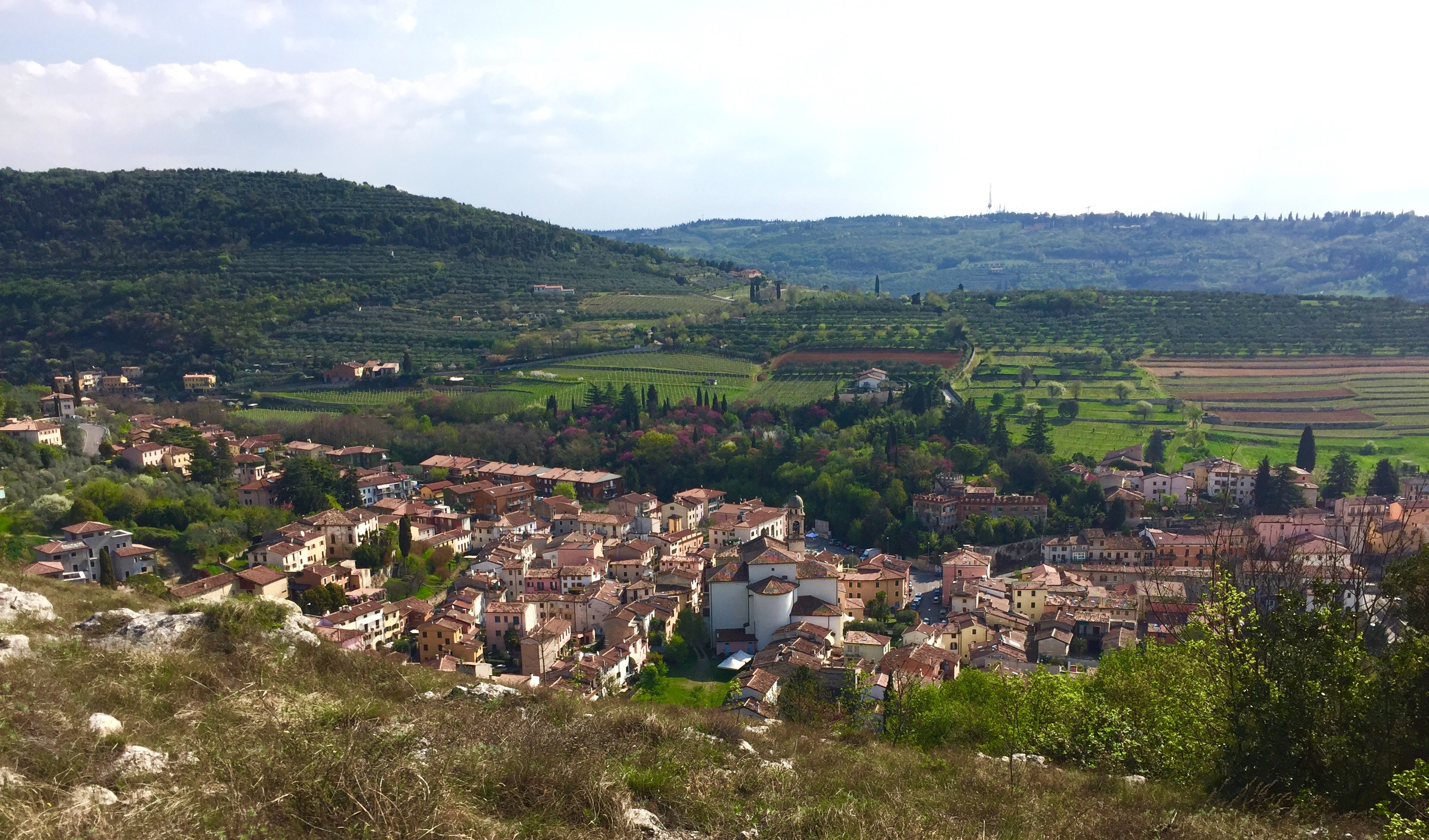
View of Quinzano and Mt. Villa from Mt. Cavro, with the characteristic Castel and, in the background, Mt. Ongarine and the Santa Giuliana ridge.

The small elevation (142 m) separates the Quinzano and Avesa valleys to the south. It derives its name from the district of the same name, once a hamlet of the autonomous municipality of Quinzano and now incorporated into the district of Ponte Crencano. Traces of a residential settlement dating back to the 1st century BC have been found in the settlement. The hill is dominated by the distinctive architecture of the 16th-century Villa Rizzoni known as "el Castel" for its late 19th-century neo-medieval restoration. The building and the top of the hill can be reached by driving along the Monte di Villa road from Ponte Crencano and via Cava Bradisa from the center of Quinzano.

=== Mount Ongarine (or Crocetta) ===
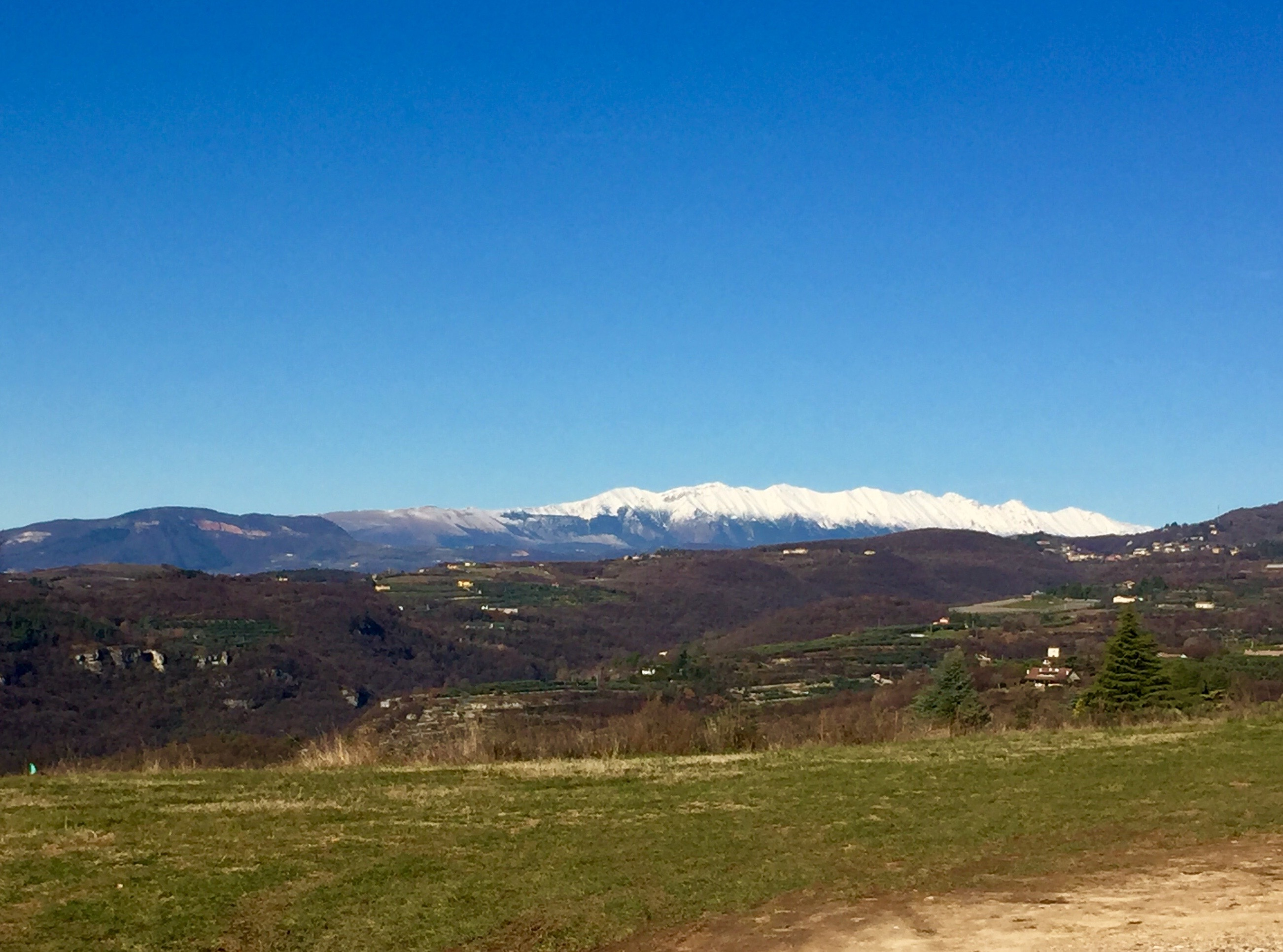
View of Mount Ongarine from the fourth Maximilian tower with snow-capped Mount Baldo in the background.

Mount Ongarine (also called Longarine or Longarina, 313 m) rises north of the towns of Quinzano and Avesa and separates their two valleys. It is also called Mount Crocetta because of the concrete cross placed on its southern summit (281 m), which is also visible from neighborhoods west of the city. At the base of the mountain are several quarries, called "i busi," from which Avesa stone, tuff used as a building material in the city, was extracted until the mid-20th century. Apparently, the mountain's name comes from "longarine," a term that would refer to the beams and columns made from the stone quarried there. Further north, the ridge of the mountain closes the narrow valley of the Borago stream to the west: in this section it is named Monte Cossa (385 m), Monte Tosato (436 m) and Maso (546 m); the latter relief marks the border with the municipality of Negrar. The hill is traversed by several paths that start from via Volte Maso in the Quinzano valley, and from via Monte Ongarine and the Borago road in the Avesa valley.

=== Mount Spigolo ===
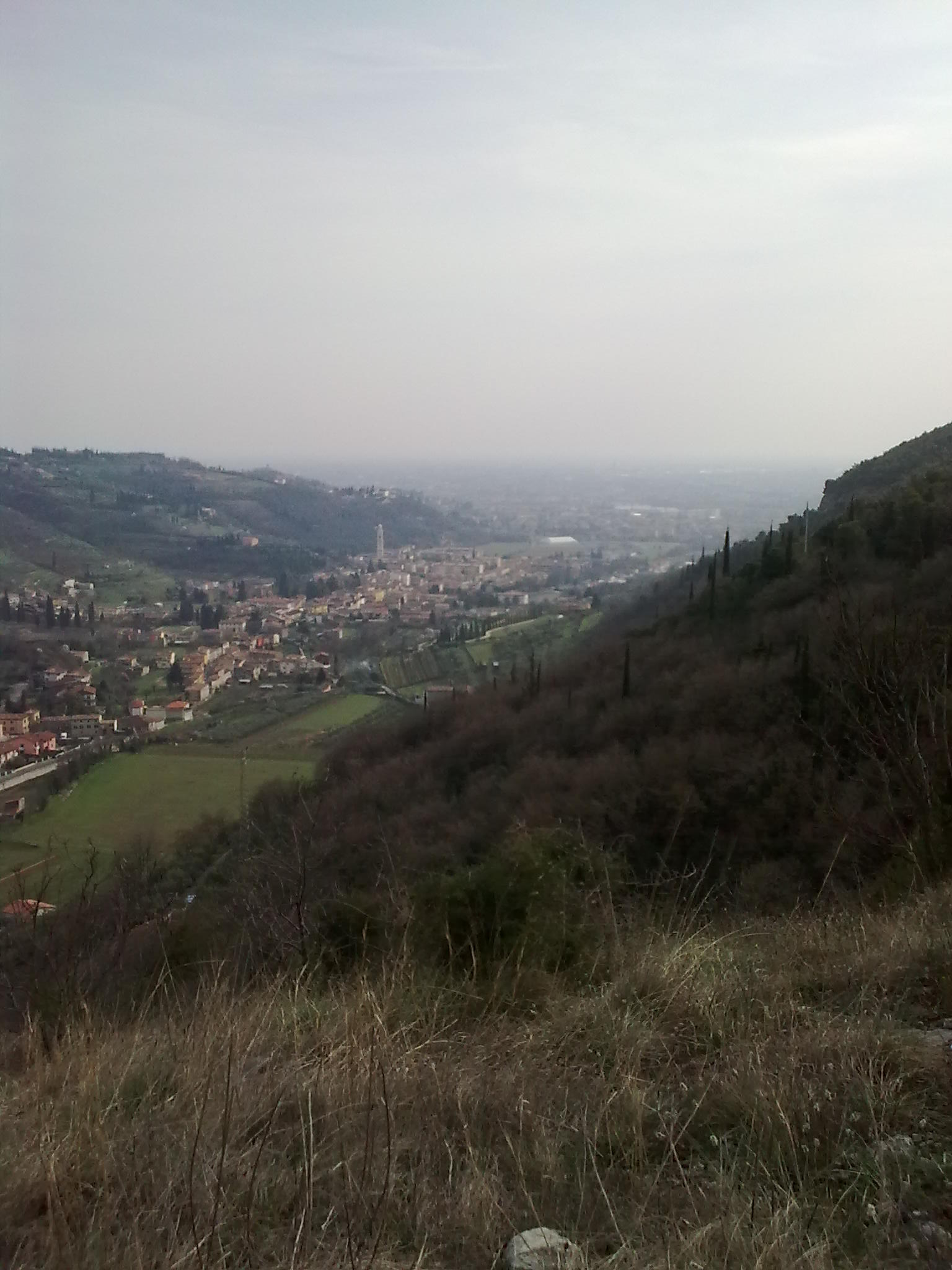
View of the Avesa valley and the village of the same name from Mt. Spigolo.

The hill (288 m) serves as a watershed between the Borago and Galina valleys into which the Avesa valley divides to the north, and overlooks the confluence of the streams of the same name that flow through the two narrow valleys. In a northerly direction, the mountain develops with increasingly higher peaks as far as the village of Montecchio (hamlet of Negrar): from south to north, one encounters Mount Tondo (347 m), Mount della Cola (385 m), known for its karst doline with an elliptical horizontal section known as the "Arena di Avesa" for its peculiar amphitheater-like conformation accentuated by terracing with dry stone walls, Mount Mezzano (380 m), and Costa Grande (503 m). The reliefs are bordered to the east by the road to Montecchio.

=== Mount Arzan and Mount Croson ===
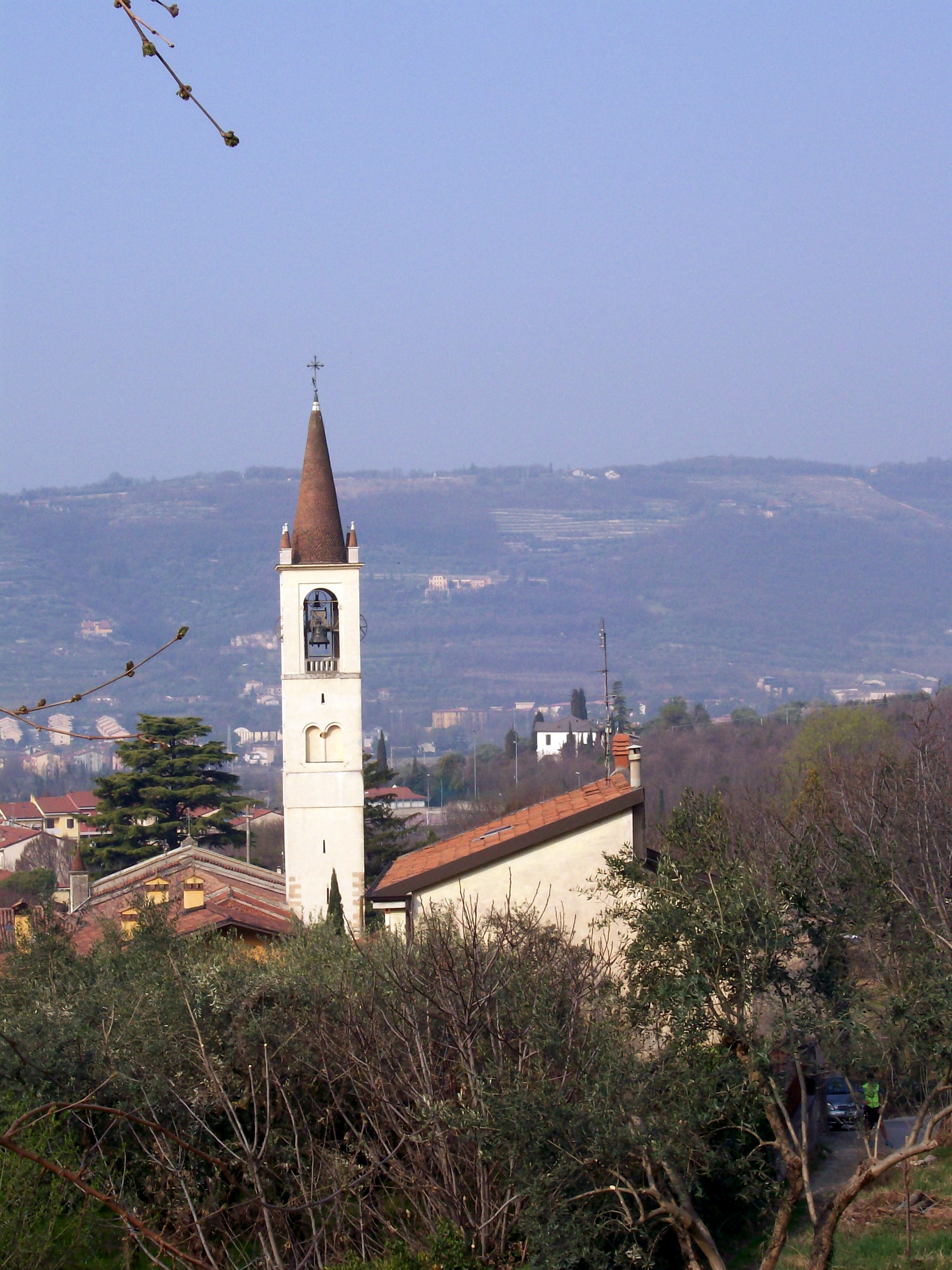
Mount Arzan seen from Santa Maria in Stelle in Valpantena.

The ridge of Mounts Arzan (257 m) and Croson (334 m) encloses the Galina valley to the east and thus separates the northern part of the Avesa Valley from the Valpantena. During World War II, the mountain's quarries housed a powder magazine blown up by the Germans on the morning of April 26, 1945 before fleeing the city. The victims of the explosion were contained (8 people) due to the intervention of the curate of Avesa, Don Giuseppe Graziani, who obtained permission from the German Command to empty the powder magazine until dawn, an undertaking in which several inhabitants of the hill town participated. The summit of Mount Arzan can be reached from the Monte Arzan road that starts north of Avesa, from Via Bonuzzo Sant'Anna that runs along the ridge between the two valleys for those coming from the city, or from Via Ronchi for those coming from Quinto di Valpantena. In a southerly direction, the hilly belt continues until it enters the historic core of the city with the Santa Giuliana ridge, Mount Calvo, and finally the hills of San Leonardo, San Felice, San Pietro, and Mount Castiglione that lap the left bank of the Adige River.

=== Torricelle (or Santa Giuliana Hill) ===
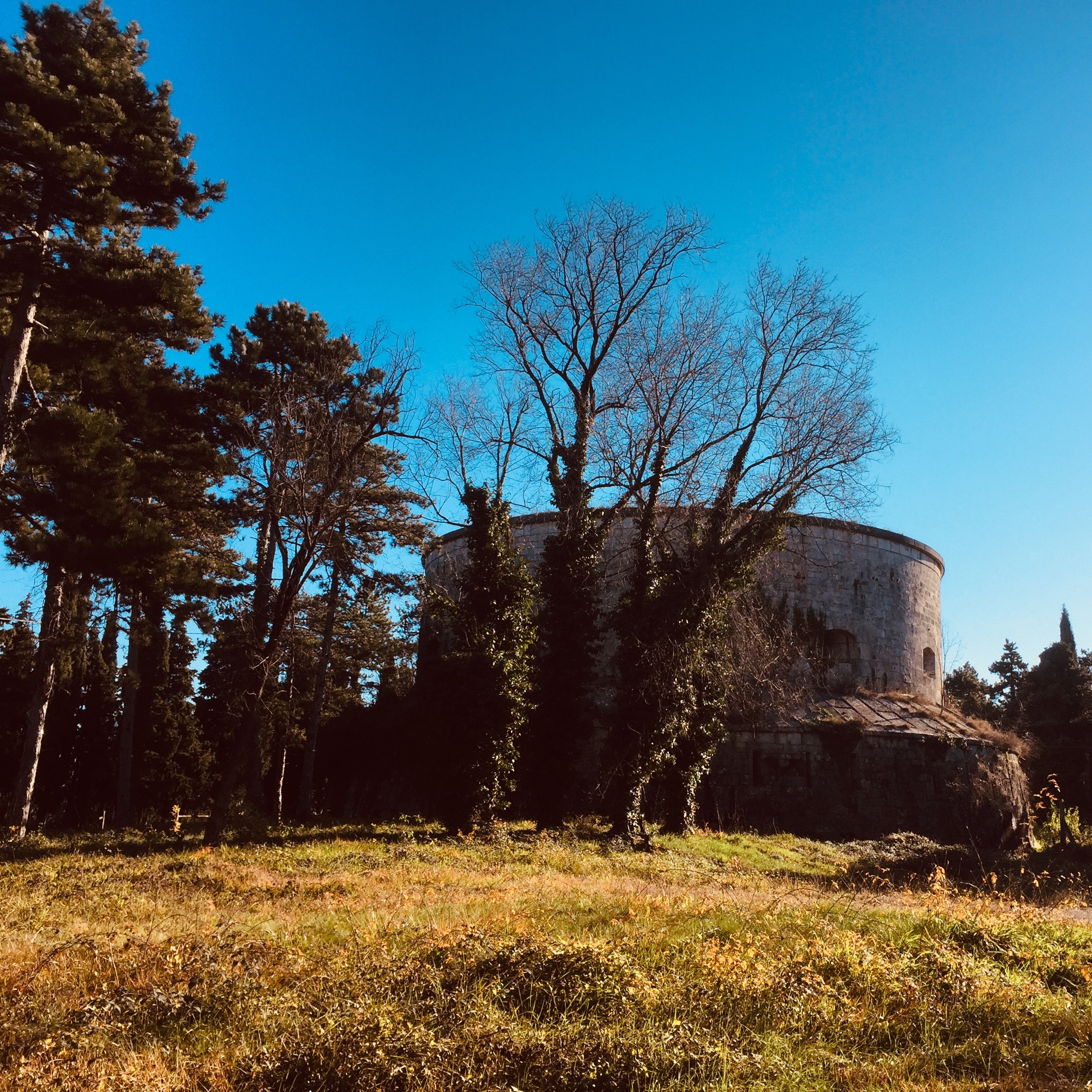
One of the four Maximilian towers on the Torricelle, now half-hidden by vegetation.

In a southerly direction, the ridge between the Avesa valley and Valpantena takes the name Torricelle at the height of the hamlets of Avesa and Poiano. This is the original nucleus that later gave its name to the larger hill system north of the city of Verona. The place-name derives from the presence in this area of the four Maximilian towers built by the Austrian army between 1837 and 1843 to defend the entrenched hill field to the north. Given the sparse vegetation, the towers in the 19th century were visible to the naked eye from the city. They still stand, a short distance apart, on either side of Torricelle Street, Santa Giuliana Street, and Bonuzzo Sant'Anna Street. The first tower (269 m) overlooks the Valpantena to the left of Via Torricelle for those coming from Verona; the second tower (280 m), erected to guard the Avesa valley, is on the right side of Via Santa Giuliana (coming from San Mattia) and is now occupied by various antennas and repeaters; the third tower (301 m) is located further north at the junction of Via Torricelle and Via Bonuzzo Sant'Anna; the fourth tower (312 m) is the northernmost and can be seen to the right as one continues north on Via Bonuzzo Sant'Anna. The second tower is opposite the Santa Giuliana Psychiatric Hospital, which bears the name of a small church built here in 1281 and destroyed in 1872.

Between the first and second towers, the ridge divides into two smaller ridges at the height of the Sommavalle fountain, an ancient spring that gushes from a rock ridge. The place-name is because the spring is located at the extreme northern apex of the valley known as Valdonega, squeezed between two minor ridges that penetrate into the city of Verona: the first to the west with Mount Calvo and San Leonardo Hill, the second to the east with the hills of San Felice, San Pietro, Castiglione and Biondella.

=== San Mattia Hill (or Mount Calvo) ===
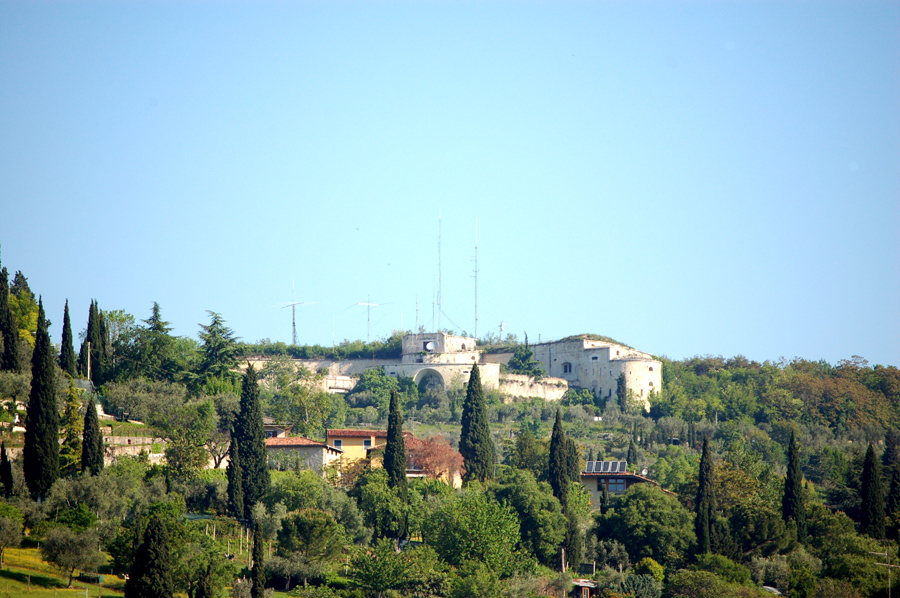
Fort San Mattia built on the hill of the same name by the Habsburg army between 1837 and 1843.

On top of the hill (220 m) stands Fort San Mattia, also built by the Austrian army between 1837 and 1843 to a design by Michael von Maly, a student of military architect Franz von Scholl. The fort's strategic location allowed it to look out over the Avesa valley, Valdonega and the entire city, crossing fire with the nearby Maximilian towers. The fort, visible from the center of Verona due to its location, takes its name from the nearby late medieval church of San Mattia (240 m above sea level), remodeled in neoclassical forms in the 19th century. The fort and the church can be reached along Viale dei Colli, a road that starts at the end of Valdonega west of Via Marsala. Several villas are also located on the hill, including the 18th-century Villa Fontana Ederle, known as "La Cipressaia," and Villa Bottico.

=== San Leonardo Hill (or Mount Donico) ===
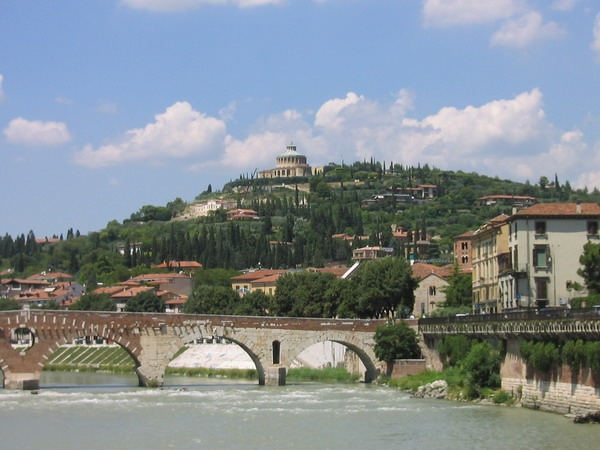
San Leonardo hill and the shrine of Our Lady of Lourdes in the background of Pietra bridge.

The hill, a natural continuation of the San Mattia ridge, lies between the extreme valley floor of Avesa to the west (occupied today by the Pindemonte neighborhood) and the Valdonega neighborhood to the east. On the highest peak (170 m) rises the shrine of Our Lady of Lourdes, built between 1958 and 1964 to a design by architect Paolo Rossi de Paoli on the centenary of the famous apparitions. The church was built by repurposing the former Austrian fort of San Leonardo, the forms of which are still clearly discernible in the circular plan of the worship building, one of the most iconic elements of the Torricelle hillside landscape. The fort, designed like the nearby Fort San Mattia in 1838 under the direction of Franz von Scholl, was granted in 1952 by the state property to the Congregation of the Stigmatine Fathers to relocate to it the shrine of Lourdes previously located in Piazza Cittadella in the city center, which had been destroyed by bombing in World War II. The new church would house the statue of the Immaculate found intact in the rubble, the work of sculptor Ugo Zannoni. From the square in front of the church, where the modern "grotto" with the statue of Our Lady stands, there is a view of the plain from the city center to the suburbs and the surrounding countryside.

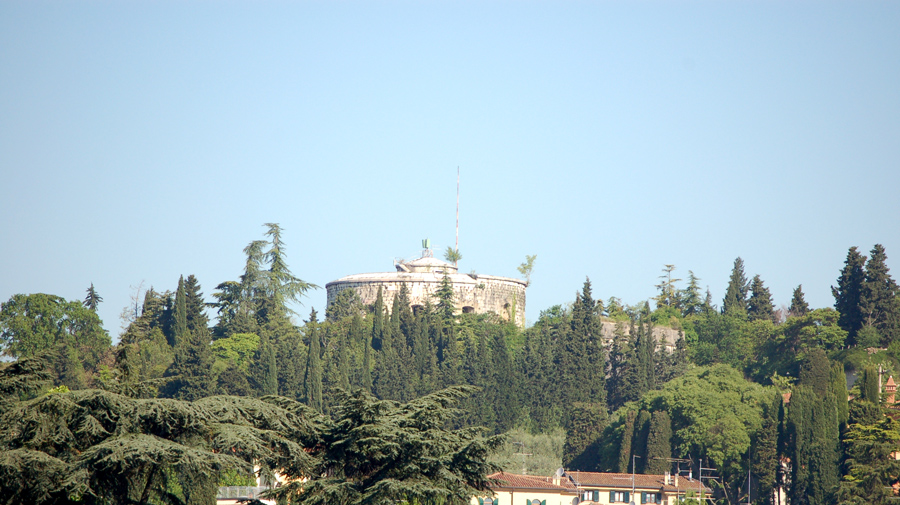
Fort Sofia, on the minor summit of San Leonardo Hill.

On a lesser peak of the hill (108 m), further south, stands Fort Sofia, also visible from the area of Ponte Pietra and Lungadige San Giorgio. The fort was also built in 1838 to a design by von Scholl to garrison the Campagnola area (today's Borgo Trento) and the territories west of the city. The military work owes its name to Archduchess Sophie of Bavaria, mother of the future Emperor Franz Joseph. After the unification of Italy, the structure was long used as a dovecote by the Italian Army Corps of Engineers for the training of carrier pigeons.

The hill and Fort San Leonardo owe their name to the church and monastery of San Leonardo in Monte Donico. The Romanesque-era complex, now deconsecrated, houses the Villa Caperle Arrighini Gerard, while preserving the bell tower and forms of the ancient religious building, visible on the side of Viale dei Colli at the intersection with Via San Leonardo and, downstream, from Lungadige Catena. Monte Donico (or mons Donicus) was the name that identified San Leonardo hill in ancient times: as with the nearby Valdonega (or Valdonica), donicus is a contraction of the classical Latin dominicus, meaning "mountain and valley belonging to the lord."

Given its proximity to the city center, on the western and southern slopes of the hill north of Via Mameli a number of small villas in eclectic style were built in the early twentieth century, reminiscent of those in the nearby Borgo Trento neighborhood: they are found mainly on Via Coni Zugna, slope Monte Grappa, Via Giovanni Vincenti, Via Giuseppe Sirtori, Via Gazzera, and at the beginning of Via San Leonardo. The latter, which runs along the western slope of the hill as far as the church of San Leonardo and then San Mattia (in the latter section it takes the name Via San Mattia) is actually an Austrian "lasagna," one of the many military roads carved out of live tuff by the Habsburg army. These characteristic narrow streets, paved with cobblestones or stones and protected by high walls, allowed troops to reach the various hill forts from the city safely and quickly.

=== Valdonega and Santo Stefano ===
Porta San Giorgio, so called because it stands near the church of San Giorgio in Braida, is also called Porta Trento because the road to Brenner corresponding to today's Via Mameli departed from there. From the gate begins the northern turreted enclosure of the Scaliger walls (datable to the 14th century), which develops on the left bank of the Adige River and encloses the districts of Santo Stefano and Veronetta as well as the hills of San Felice and San Pietro. The Santo Stefano district is developed on the first slopes of the hills: it takes its name from the church built on the river bank around the 5th century as one of the first Christian places of worship in the city and rebuilt in Romanesque forms in the 12th century.

The walls that enclose Santo Stefano to the north and separate it from the Valdonega were remodeled in Venetian and Austrian times: between 1522 and 1525 the Rondella di San Giorgio was built at the gate of the same name and the Rondella delle Boccare was built. From the San Giorgio gate, Via Ippolito Nievo climbs the hills, bordering the outer side of the walls and leading to Via Castel San Felice, which climbs the hill of the same name with a series of narrow hairpin bends. The Valdonega district, which runs north of the street, occupies the area of the narrow valley between the San Leonardo and San Felice hills enclosed to the north by the Sommavalle, where the two hillsides rejoin. This area facing the city has been urbanized since the early twentieth century on the model of English garden cities, but it was inhabited from earlier times: this is evidenced by the remains of a Roman villa dating back to the first century A.D. discovered in 1957 during the construction of an apartment building on Via Cesare Zoppi; the archaeological site is still visible. Although the neighborhood underwent intense urbanization after World War II, examples of small villas built there at the turn of the century still survive, as in the nearby Borgo Trento neighborhood.

=== San Felice Hill ===
The hill, which encloses Valdonega to the east, is the natural continuation of the cordon that descends from Sommavalle and divides the city from Valpantena. It derives its name from the fortified citadel erected in Visconti times (between 1390 and 1409) at the northernmost point of the Scaligeri magistral wall. To build the fortress, the church of San Felice and the adjoining monastery, attested at this location since 938, were demolished, hence the name of the citadel and the hill. The castle was remodeled by the Austrians in the 19th century and now lies in a state of neglect.

The apex of the hill where the remains of the castle are visible can be reached from Via Giovanni Francesco Caroto and Via Castellana for those coming from Borgo Venezia, and from Via Castel San Felice for those coming from Valdonega. Both streets run along the outer side of the city wall. Along Via Castel San Felice, a hairpin bend at an altitude of 170 meters leads to the Colombare Park, which covers about 32,000 square meters on the western slope of the hill outside the walls and offers various views of the city. From the top of the hill near the castle, the hill cordon divides into two distinct ridges that enclose the valley of San Giovanni in Valle: to the west is the San Pietro hill and to the east is Mount Castiglione.

=== San Pietro Hill (or Mount Gallo) ===
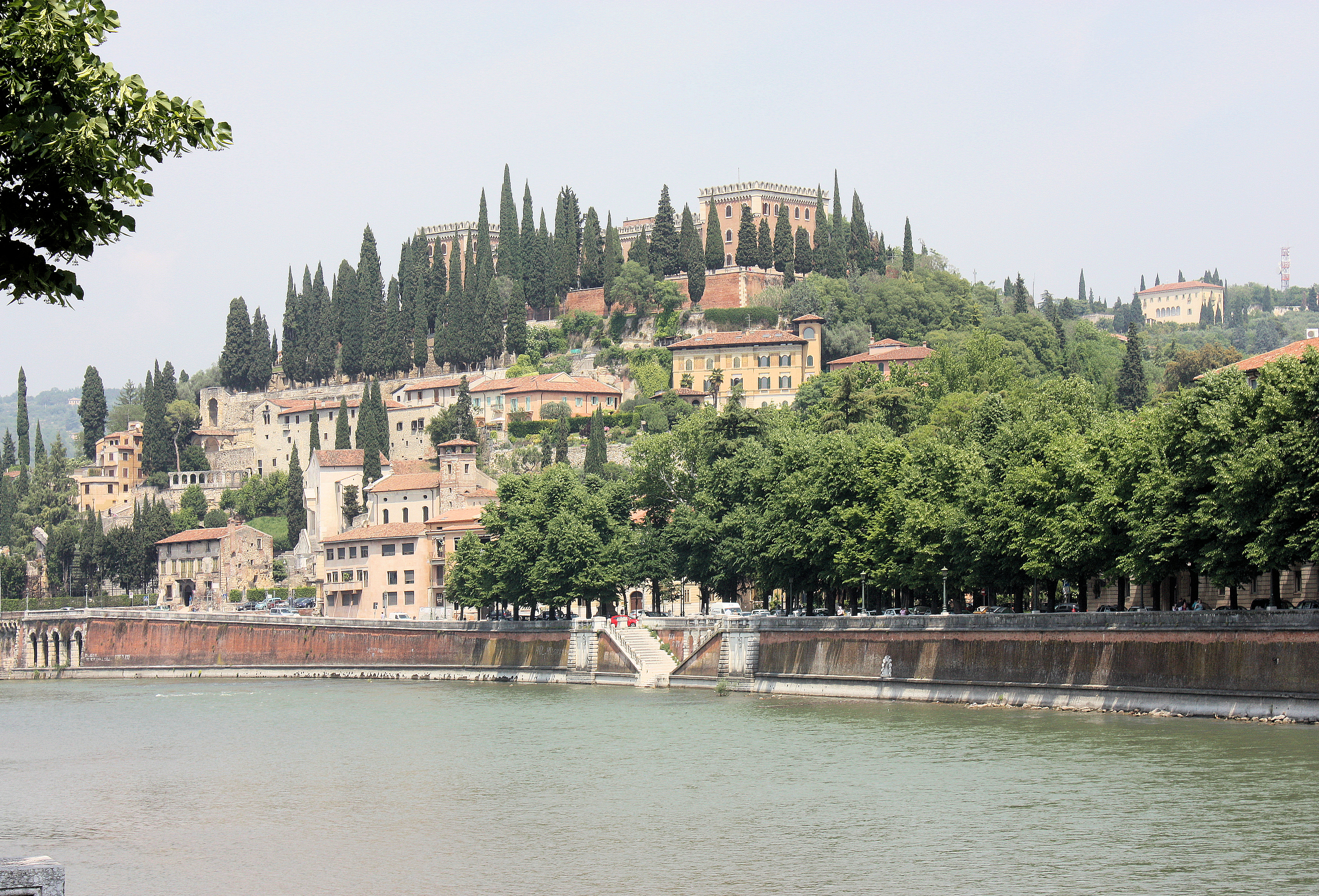
San Pietro Hill as seen from the Bra Molinari square.

To the east, the Santo Stefano district is enclosed by the San Pietro hill, the eastern continuation of the ridge that runs from Mount Arzan and divides at the Sommavalle fountain to the bend in the Adige River. The hill of modest height overlooks the city and is clearly visible in the stretch of the Lungadige between the Garibaldi Bridge and the New Bridge. Also known as Mount Gallo, it is the area where the founding nucleus of the city was settled in the Bronze Age. About 3,000 years ago, the first inhabitants built a small hill village in this strategic area from which they overlooked the course of the Adige River and the plain. According to one hypothesis, the very name of the city of Verona derives from the term "verone," or panoramic balcony from which it was possible to observe the plain.

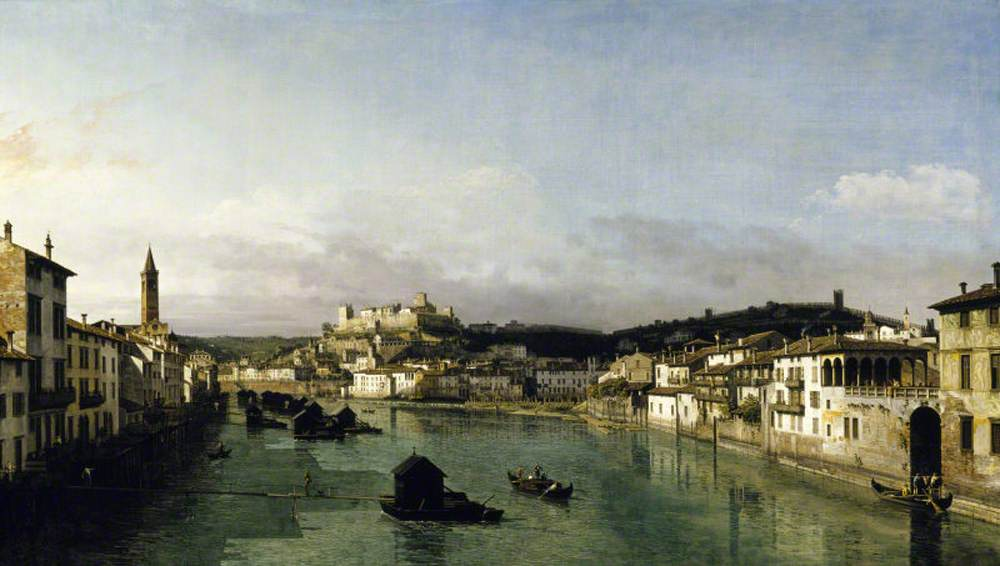
View of the Visconti castle on the top of San Pietro hill in an 18th-century painting by Bernardo Bellotto.

When Verona became Roman, the city moved to the castrum included in the bend of the Adige River where the historic city center still stands today. However, the hill overlooking the two main bridges in Roman times, the Pietra bridge and the Postumio bridge (the latter no longer extant) continued to be included within the walls. It was in this era that the hill took on a monumental function: on the southwestern slope that looked toward the city a theater (still known as the Roman theater) was built in the 1st century BC using the natural slope of the hill as a base for the cavea. A temple dedicated to Jupiter was also erected on the summit. On the remains of the pagan place of worship in Christian times a church dedicated to St. Peter was built, attested in sources from the 5th century. It is thought that the Ostrogothic king Theodoric built his sumptuous palace there in the 6th century; given the strategic location, King Berengar also had a fortress erected there between the 9th and 10th centuries, on which Gian Galeazzo Visconti later built a real castle at the end of the 14th century, known as Castel San Pietro because of its proximity to the church. In the 16th century a cistern was also built under the castle to collect water, which still exists today.

After the Treaty of Lunéville, which divided Verona in two, leaving the part to the right of the Adige River to France and the left bank including the hill to Austria, the French blew up the castle and the nearby church before retreating to the opposite bank. Between 1851 and 1856, on their remains the Austrians built a massive Rundbogen-style infantry barracks designed by Conrad Petrasch. The monumental building visible from all over the city became for the Veronese the new Castel San Pietro: it still overlooks the hill today. The ruins of the castle that still subsisted to the north of the building were integrated into the new complex and were reused as a fortified enclosure: a large portion of what remains of the Visconti fortress can be seen on Via Castel San Pietro in the section leading to the forecourt in front of the barracks. From this clearing there is one of the best-known and most photographed views of the entire city.

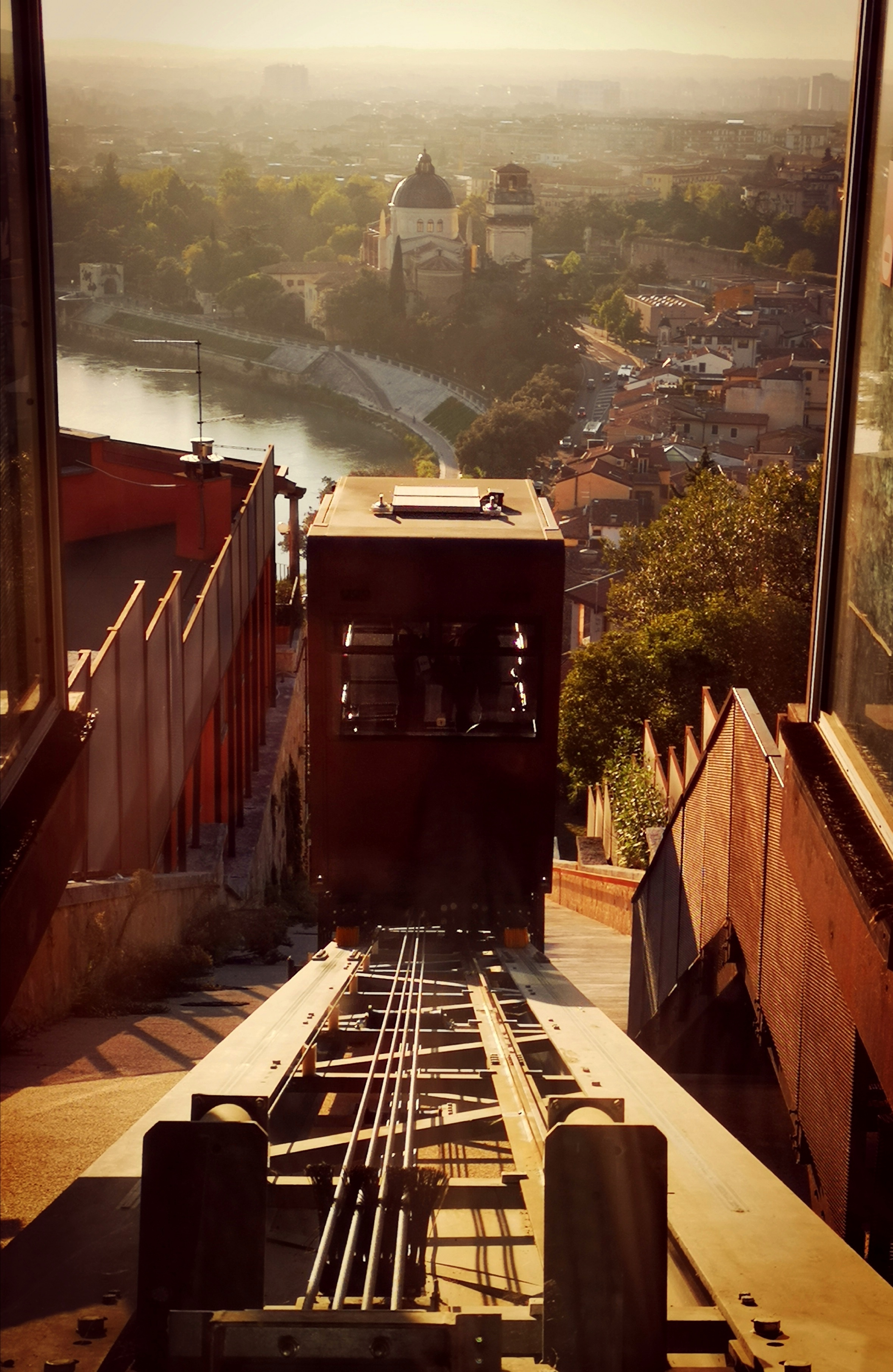
The funicular railway of Castel San Pietro with the Adige River and the church of San Giorgio in Braida in the background.

Over the centuries, the Roman theater had been covered by a network of dense dwellings: it was only around 1830 that the wealthy merchant Andrea Monga purchased the area and had the hovels demolished at his own expense to begin excavations that would unearth the ancient theater, which is still used today for live performances. On the steps remains the small Gothic church of Saints Siro and Libera, which survived nineteenth-century demolitions and is accessed by a Baroque-era staircase. Between the theater and the barracks rises the mighty fifteenth-century bulk of the convent of San Girolamo, which has housed the archaeological museum since 1923.

The apex of the hill, which corresponds to the square of Castel San Pietro, can be reached via two stairways that start at its foot, the first at the height of Ponte Pietra and the second in Botte alley (from which the theater is also accessed), or by the panoramic funicular built in 1941 and restored in 2017. The structure starts from a side street of Via Madonna del Terraglio on the slopes of the hill and covers a 55-meter drop.

=== San Giovanni in Valle ===
San Pietro hill separates Santo Stefano from the small valley of San Giovanni in Valle where the very ancient Romanesque church of the same name, attested since the 7th century, is located. The district, included in the city walls and integrated into the larger Veronetta district, spreads on the slopes of the hill to the east and climbs them up to the Iron Fountain. The waters of the natural spring that closes the valley to the north were piped to the well in Cisterna Square, a few steps from the church, built in the 15th century and in use until the 19th century.

On one of the two slopes leading up to the fountain is the 16th-century Villa Francescatti, built at the foot of San Pietro Hill. Attached to the villa is an Italian garden of about 5,000 square meters built on several terraces. The building housed a youth hostel from 1980 to 2017.

Near the church is also the Duke's Court, a fenced plot of land from medieval times cultivated as a vegetable garden by the Poor Clare nuns and now used as a public garden: the toponym is thought to be due to the fact that Alboin had built his palace there after the conquest of the city in 568 and the founding of the Duchy of Verona.

=== Mount Castiglione ===
To the east, the village of San Giovanni in Valle is closed by Mount Castiglione (also attested as Costiglione), which continues the ridge of San Felice hill to the east and separates the Veronetta district to the southwest from Biondella and Borgo Venezia to the northeast. On the ridge of the hill, the extreme eastern offshoot of the Torricelle, runs the turreted city wall from the Scaligeri era that joins Porta Vescovo to Castel San Felice: in the Venetian era, the washers of Santa Toscana and San Zeno in Monte were built there. The walls with their characteristic turrets overlooking Veronetta can be reached from Salita Santo Sepolcro and via San Zeno in Monte, which run on the inner side, or from various footpaths adjacent to via Giovanni Francesco Caroto on the outer side.

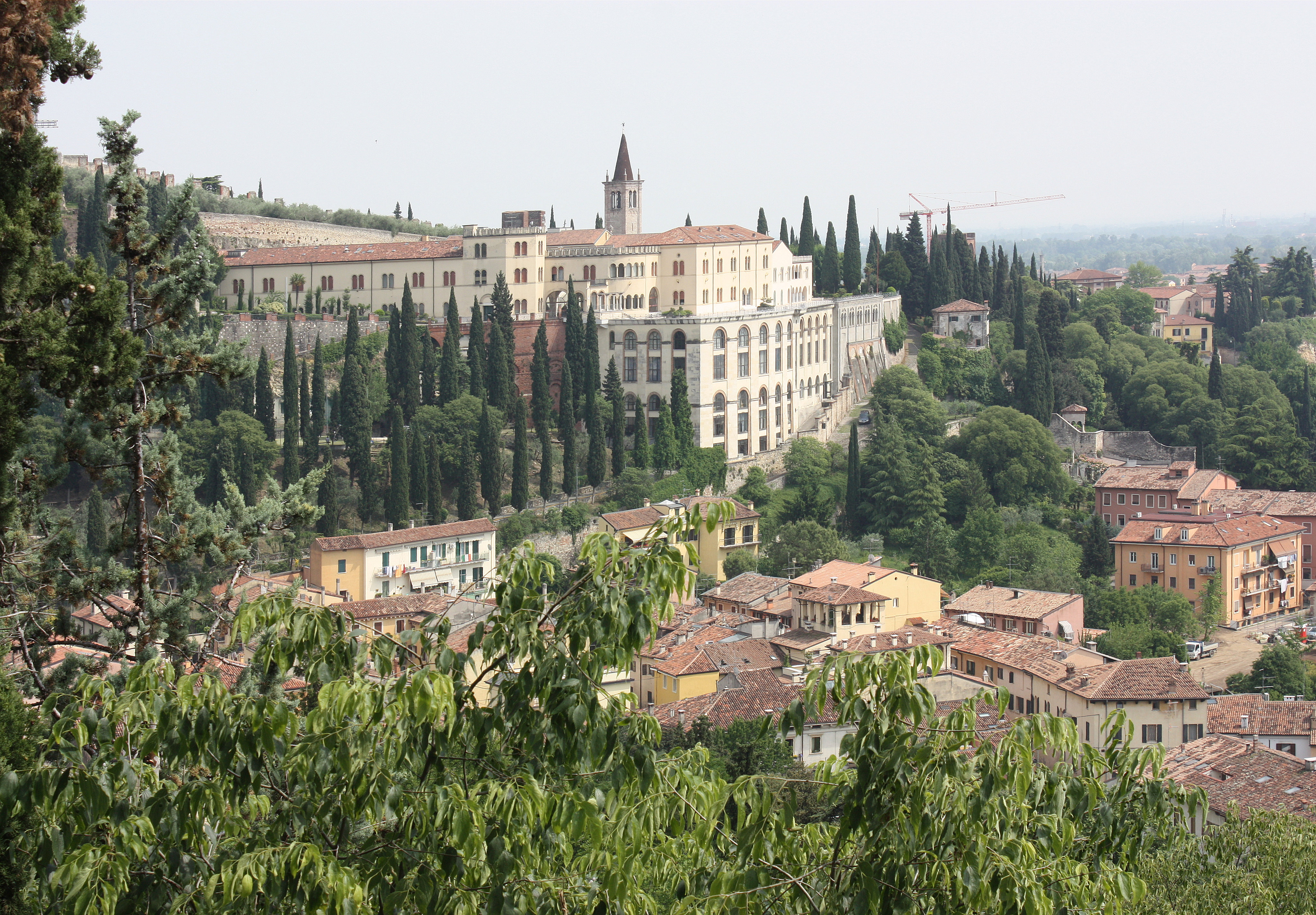
The Don Calabria Institute and the church of San Zeno in Monte on Castiglione Mountain as seen from San Pietro Hill.

On the western slope of the hill behind the walls stands the 15th-century Romanesque church of San Zeno in Monte. The adjoining convent, used by the Austrians as barracks, has housed Don Calabria's Congregation of Poor Servants of Divine Providence since 1910. The building was restored in 1936 and now overlooks the cityscape east of downtown along with the church bell tower and the 19-meter-high bright iron cross erected there by the Congregation in 1934. From the district of San Giovanni in Valle climbs toward the Don Calabria Institute the Scala Santa, a cobblestone-paved staircase with the Stations of the Cross inserted on either side.

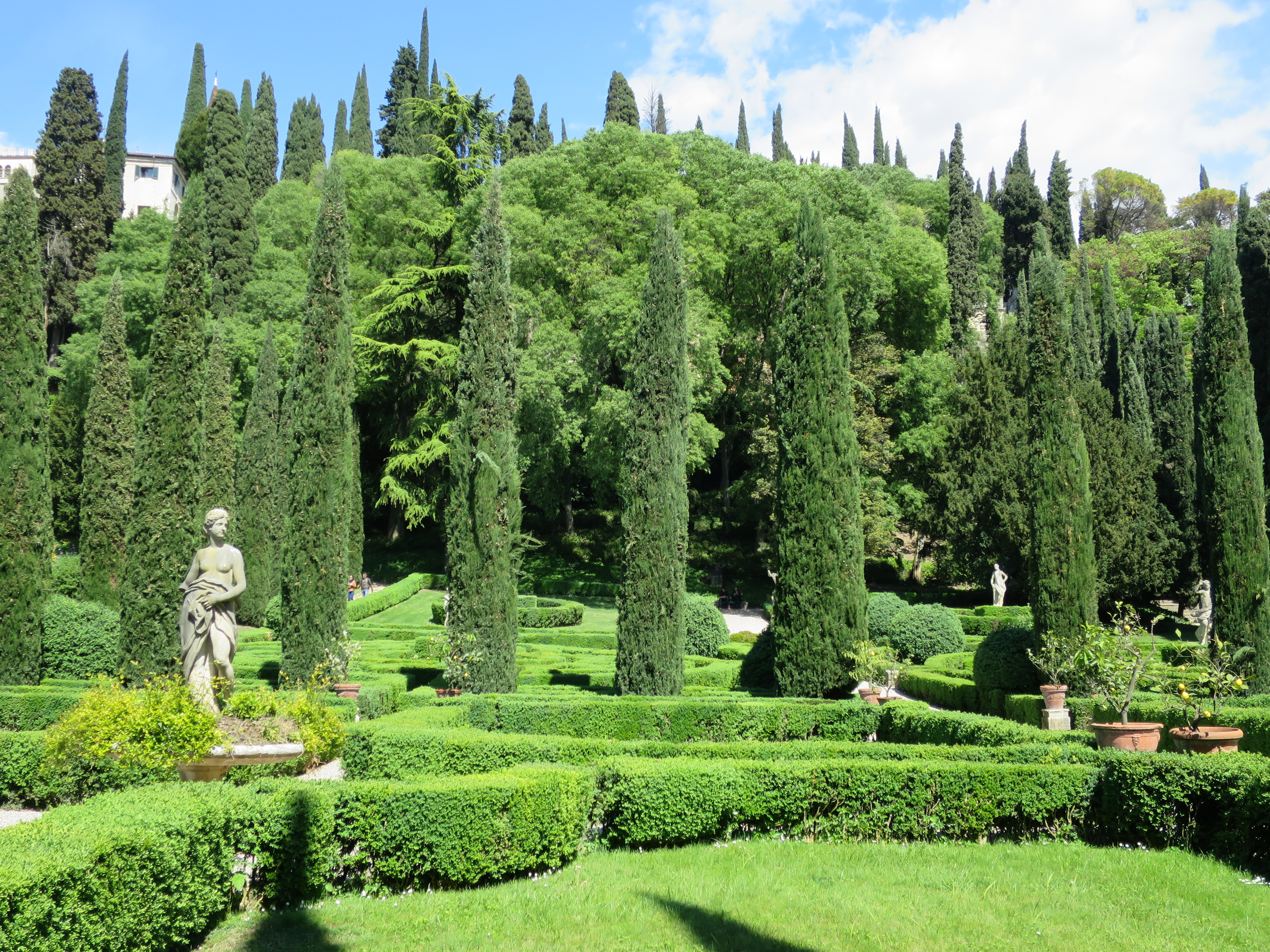
Mount Castiglione in the background of the Giusti Garden.

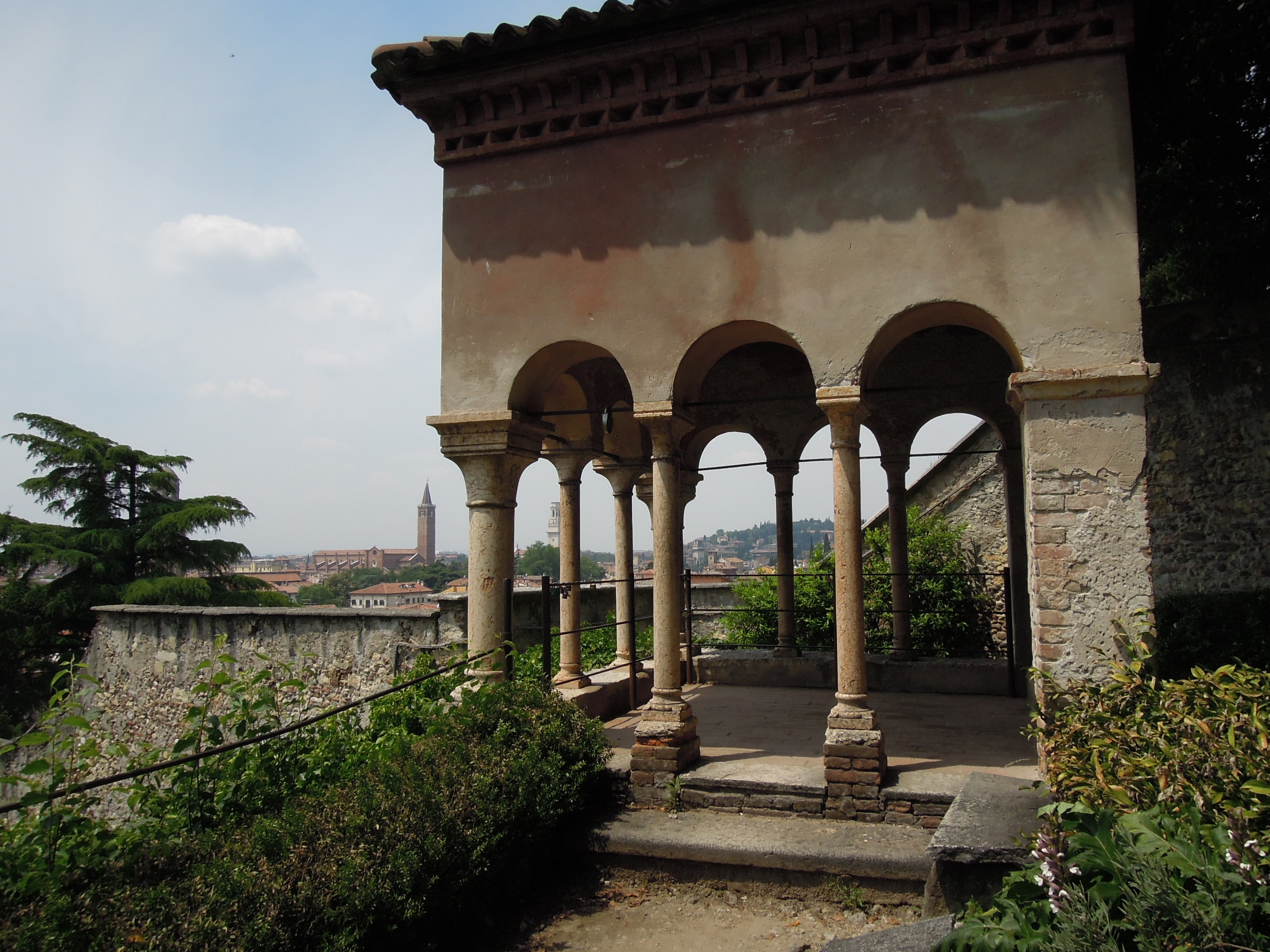
The belvedere pavilion of the Giusti Garden on Mt. Castiglione.

Slightly further south, on the western slopes of the hill is the Giusti Garden, a late Renaissance Italian garden built on the back of the 16th-century Giusti del Giardino palace. The park climbs the hill on several terraces planted with box, cypress and citrus trees, and embellished with labyrinths, fountains, mythological statues, stairways and artificial grottoes. The cliff of the hill, on the other hand, is kept as an evergreen forest: from there one reaches a belvedere balcony above a mascaron and a covered pavilion from which there is a view of the entire city.

A little to the south of the garden, the hill is crossed by a tunnel opened just below the San Zeno in Monte washer in the 1960s: it connects Via Nazario Sauro, in Veronetta, with Via Alessandro Volta in Borgo Venezia. A short distance away, on the southern slopes of the hill stands the church of Saints Nazaro and Celso, built on another place of worship carved into the rock, the three compartments of which hollowed out in the hill still remain.

On the ridge of the hill above the church close to the walls rises the residential neighborhood of Alto San Nazaro, built in 1887 as a working-class neighborhood by the Società Anonima Cooperativa Edificatrice di Case Operaie. The neighborhood can be reached from the XVI Ottobre staircase, which climbs from a side street of Via San Nazaro; it can also be reached from the north by crossing a breach in the walls between Via Caroto and Salita Santo Sepolcro. The toponym of the staircase hands down the original name of the residential complex, baptized Quartiere XVI Ottobre to commemorate the date of Verona's unification to the Kingdom of Italy in 1866. Near the neighborhood there is also a park from which the Veronetta area and Porta Vescovo are overlooked.

Past the neighborhood, Mount Castiglione slopes down into the valley. The area inside the walls is occupied by the Santa Toscana district, which is built around the church of the same name erected on the slopes of the hill on the pre-existing remains of a small church dedicated to the Holy Sepulchre. The city wall, closed by the Santa Toscana washer which now houses a public park, descends rapidly down the last hillsides to connect with Porta Vescovo and continue into the plain.

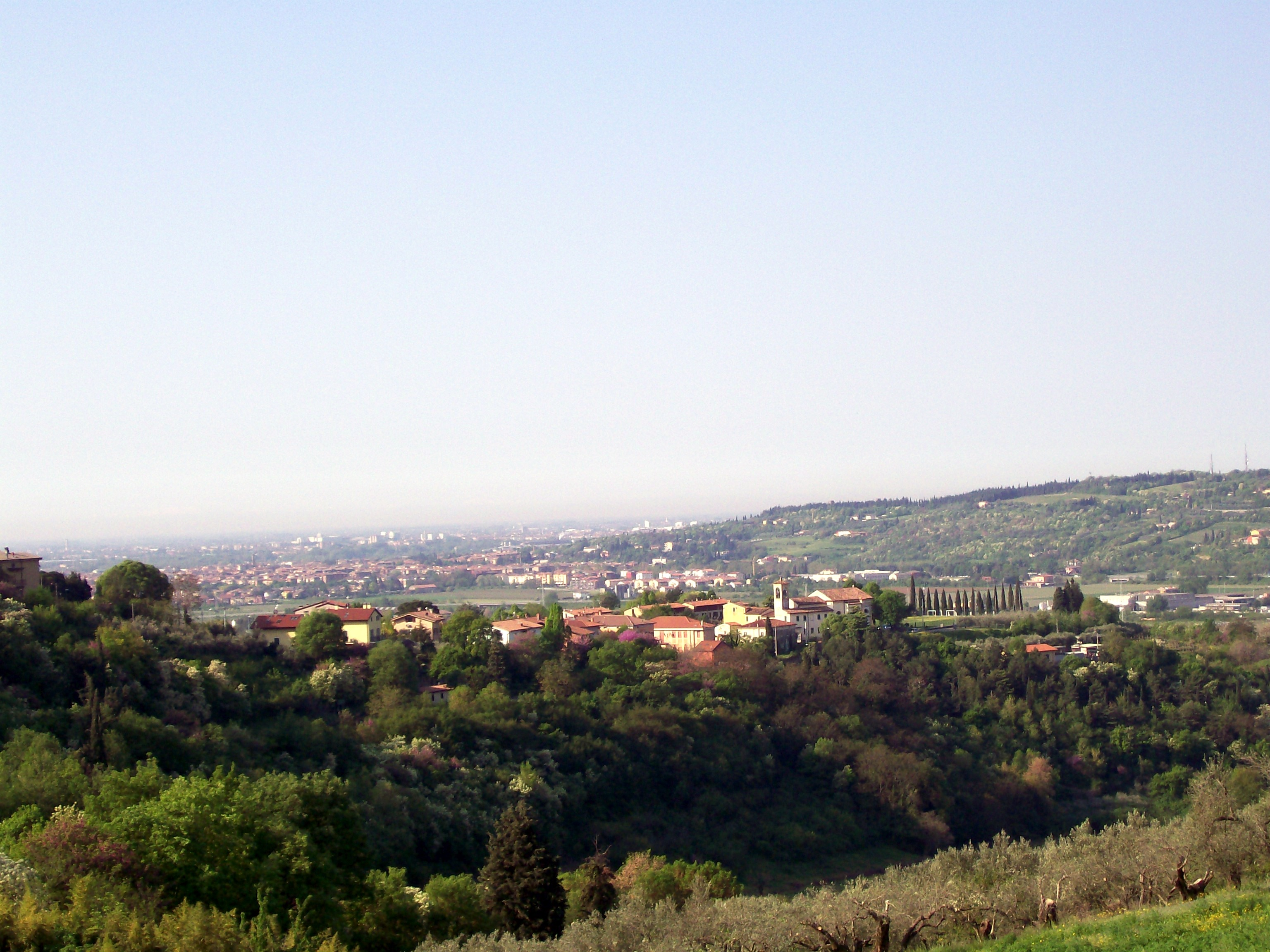
View of the Torricelle from the hamlet of Novaglie at the point where they slope toward Borgo Venezia. To the right is San Felice hill and to the left the last heights of Biondella.

=== Biondella Hill ===
To the northeast of Mount Castiglione, the residential neighborhood of Biondella has developed since the early twentieth century, now integrated into the larger context of Borgo Venezia. The neighborhood creeps up the hillsides in two distinct depressions separated by the elevation of Biondella Hill, developing on the road axes of Via Alessandro Volta to the south (which connects to Veronetta via the tunnel under the San Zeno in Monte washer) and Via Biondella to the north, which climbs the eastern slope to join Via Castellana. The latter street skirts the hill ridge on the Valpantena side to the hamlet of Poiano. The neighborhood, urbanized in the early twentieth century, is characterized by low two and three-story cottages, some dating from the early postwar period.

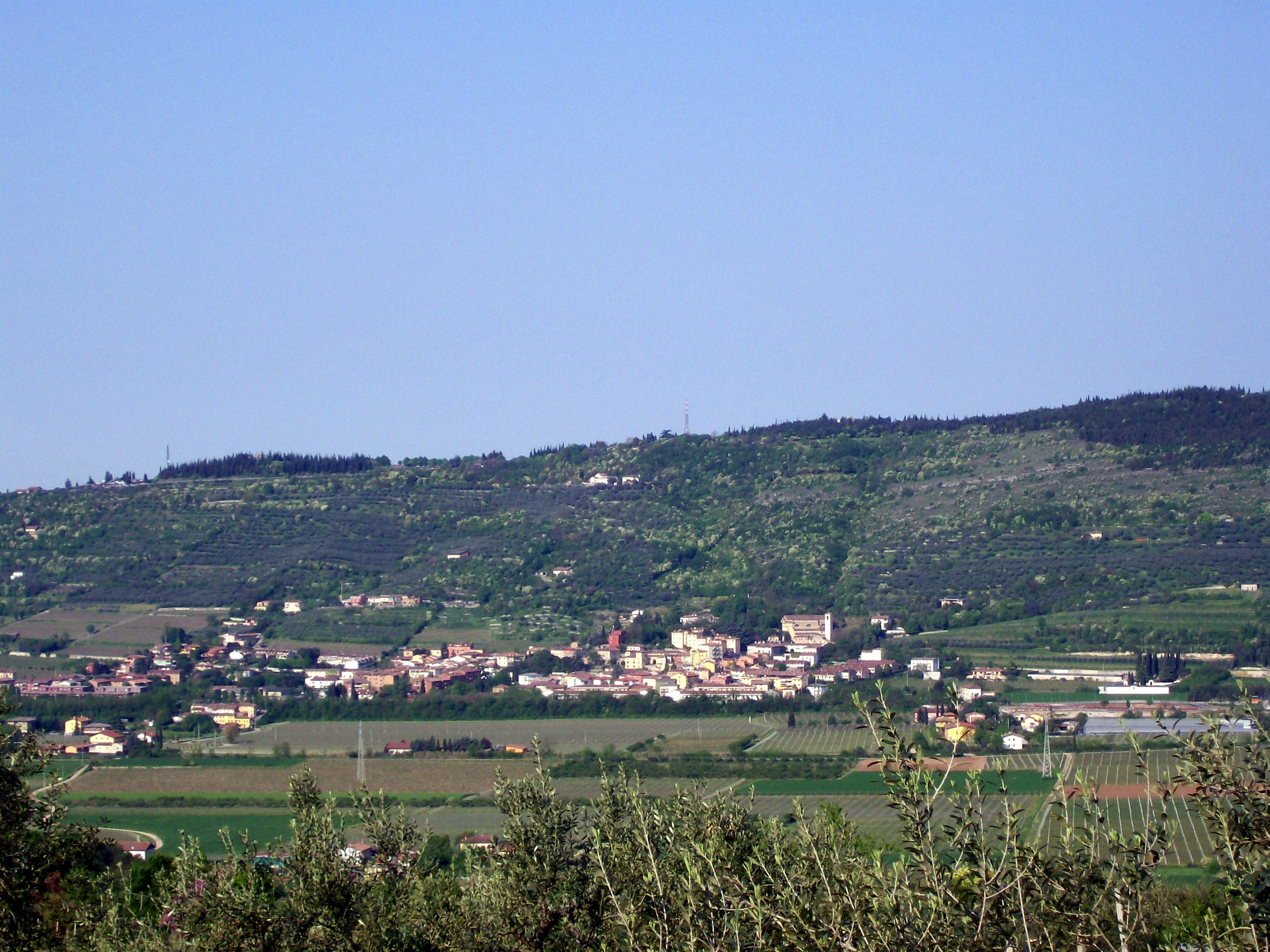
View of the Torricelle from the lower Valpantena, with the village of Poiano on the slopes.

At the top of the Biondella hill stands Fort Biondella, built in 1838 by the Austrian Army Corps of Engineers to guard the plain east of Verona and the entrance to the Valpantena. It is possible to reach the fort and the top of the hill by two separate climbs: the first, Via Giovanni Francesco Caroto, goes up the southern slope to the right of Via Alessandro Volta; the second is found by continuing on Via Biondella to the intersection with the same Via Caroto. North of Biondella, the eastern slope of the Torricelle continues its course northward and closes the Valpantena to the west until it joins the Lessini Mountains near Grezzana.

== Hiking ==
Given the scenic beauty, the proximity to the city, and the historical stratifications left behind by thousands of years of human settlement, the Torricelle hills are a destination for hikers. Among the various trails that cross the hills are the Dorsale Giuliani from Parona to Poiano, the Transtoresela from the Eremo di San Rocchetto to Poiano, and the intineraries that go up the valleys of Avesa and Quinzano. Since 1973, the "4 passi di primavera" running event has been held on the Torricelle, during which the village of Montecchio is reached from the city.

== See also ==
- Verona
- Verona defensive system

== Bibliography ==
- AA.VV. (2003). Verona e il suo territorio. Vol. 6.2. Verona: Istituto per gli studi storici veronesi.
- Comune di Verona, ed. (2011). "Piano degli Interventi. Allegato 9: Elementi connotativi degli ambiti paesaggistici omogenei". Piano di Assetto del Territorio (PDF). Verona: Comune di Verona. Archived (PDF) from the original on 29 July 2014.
- Comune di Verona, ed. (2011). "Piano degli Interventi. Relazione". Piano di Assetto del Territorio (PDF). Verona: Comune di Verona. Archived (PDF) from the original on 30 December 2020.
- Guido Gonzato; Alberto Castellarin; Roberto Chignola; Fabio Gamberini; Paolo Lazzeri; Unione Speleologica Veronese (2015). Laura De Nitto; Francesco Maurano; Mario Parise (eds.). "Nuovi dati sui fenomeni paleocarsici nelle colline Torricelle (Verona)" (PDF). Atti del XXII Congresso Nazionale di Speleologia. Pertosa-Auletta: Società Speleologica Italiana. Archived (PDF) from the original on 30 December 2020.
