= Verona funicular =

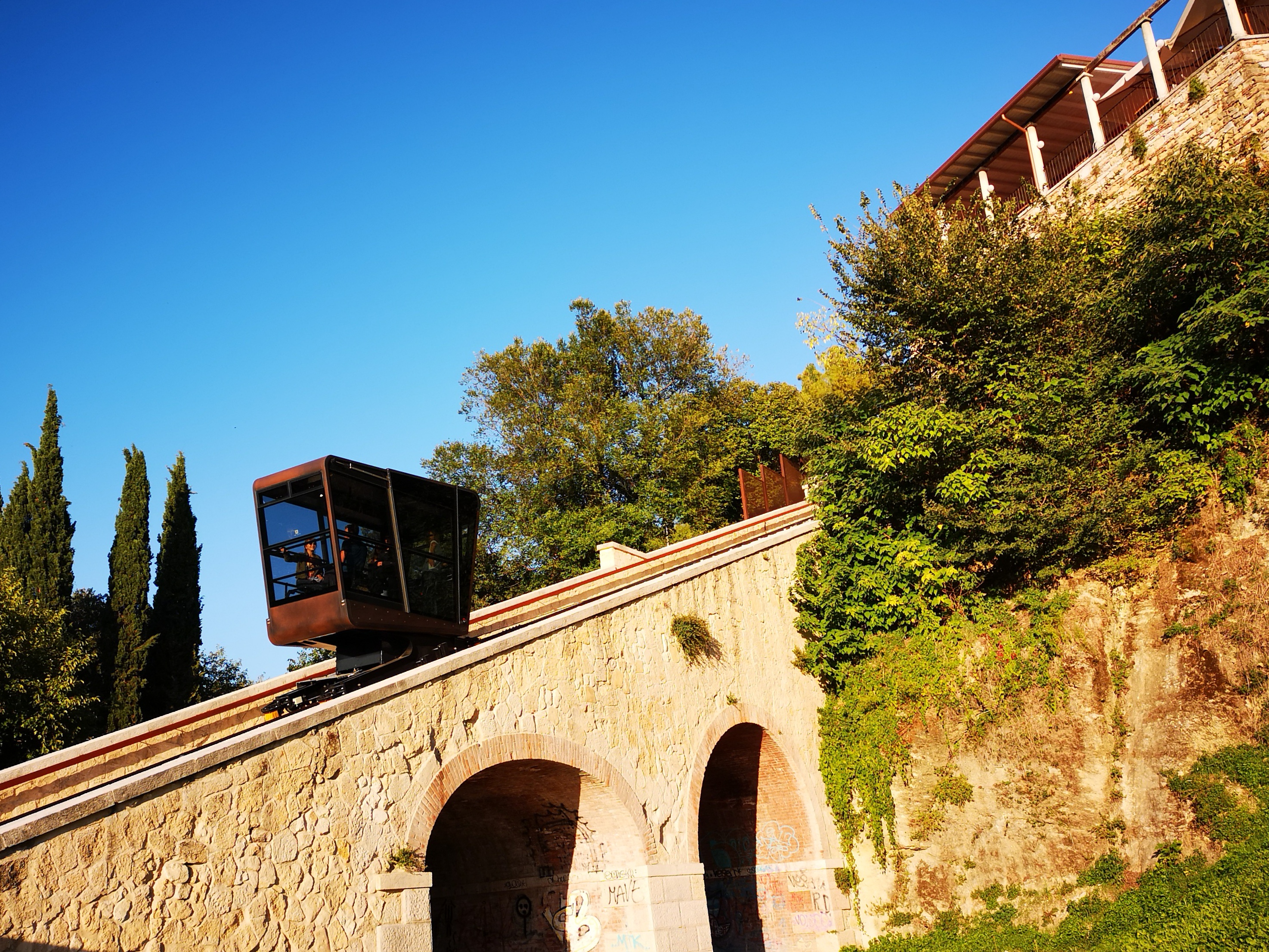
- Functioning as an incline lift in 2018

Overview
- Locale: Verona, Veneto, Italy
- Stations: 3
- Website: https://www.funicolarediverona.it

Service
- Type: Incline lift

History
- Opened: 1941
- Closed: 1944
- Reopened: 2017

Technical
- Track length: 180 m (590 ft)

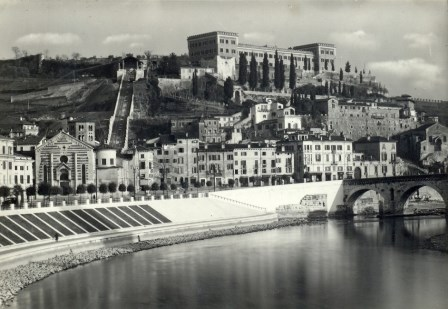
Photo of the San Pietro Castle and funicular in 1941

The Verona funicular (Italian: Funicolare di Verona), also known as the San Pietro Castle funicular (Italian: Funicolare di Castel San Pietro), is an incline lift in the Veronetta district of Verona, Italy. The lift previously operated as a funicular railway and is still officially named after the funicular.

Originally constructed as a funicular, the line opened in 1941 to provide access to the San Pietro Castle near the ancient Roman theatre. The funicular closed three years later as San Pietro's function as a tourist attraction failed to materialize at the time.

In the 2000s, the Verona municipal government explored options to reopen the long abandoned railway. Eventually, it was decided to re-purpose the funicular as an incline lift and the new service was completed in 2017. The current service includes two termini and an intermediate stop. The incline lift is 180 m (590 ft) long and gains an elevation of 55 m (180 ft) at a 36% slope. The line is served by a single 25-person capacity cabin.
