= Ponte Pietra (Verona) =

Ponte Pietra (Pons Lapideus)
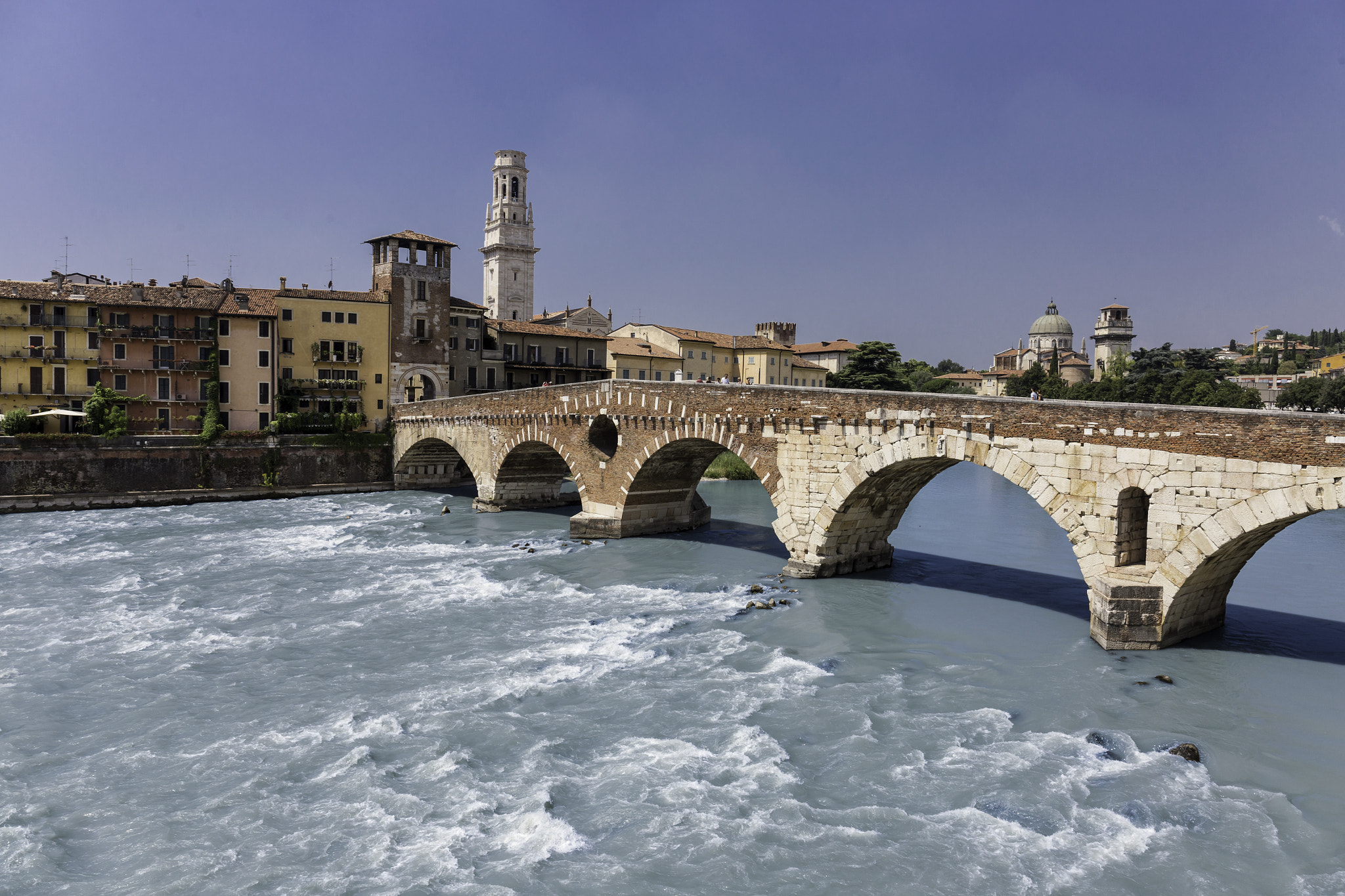
- The arch at the far left is the only one which escaped destruction in 1945.
- Coordinates: 45.4477°N 10.9999°E
- Crosses: Adige River
- Locale: Verona, Italy

Characteristics
- Design: Arch bridge
- Material: Travertine, brick
- Total length: 120 m
- No. of spans: 5

History
- Construction end: 100 BC; 1957
- Closed: April 1945 (4 of 5 spans destroyed)

Location
- Interactive map of Ponte Pietra (Pons Lapideus)

The Ponte Pietra (Italian for "Stone Bridge") is a Roman arch bridge crossing the Adige River in Verona, Italy. The bridge was completed in 100 BC, and the Via Postumia from Genoa to Aquileia passed over it. It is the oldest bridge in Verona.

It originally flanked another Roman bridge, the Pons Postumius (called Pons Marmoreus and at Middle Ages was called Fractus - broken, now remain some fragments); both structures provided the city (on the right bank) with access to the Roman theatre on the east bank. The arch nearest to the right bank of the Adige was rebuilt in 1298 by Alberto I della Scala. Four arches of the bridge were blown up by retreating German troops in World War II, but rebuilt in 1957 with original materials.

== See also ==
- List of Roman bridges
- Roman architecture
- Roman engineering

== Notes and references ==
- Galliazzo, Vittorio (1994), I ponti romani. Catalogo generale, vol. 2, Treviso: Edizioni Canova, pp. 223–226 (No. 456), ISBN 88-85066-66-6
- O’Connor, Colin (1993), Roman Bridges, Cambridge University Press, pp. 93f. (I169), ISBN 0-521-39326-4
