= Santa Toscana, Verona =

Italian Catholic church

Coordinates: 45°26′24.3″N 11°00′49.9″E

Santa Toscana is a late-Romanesque and early Gothic-style, Roman Catholic church located in central Verona, region of Veneto, Italy.

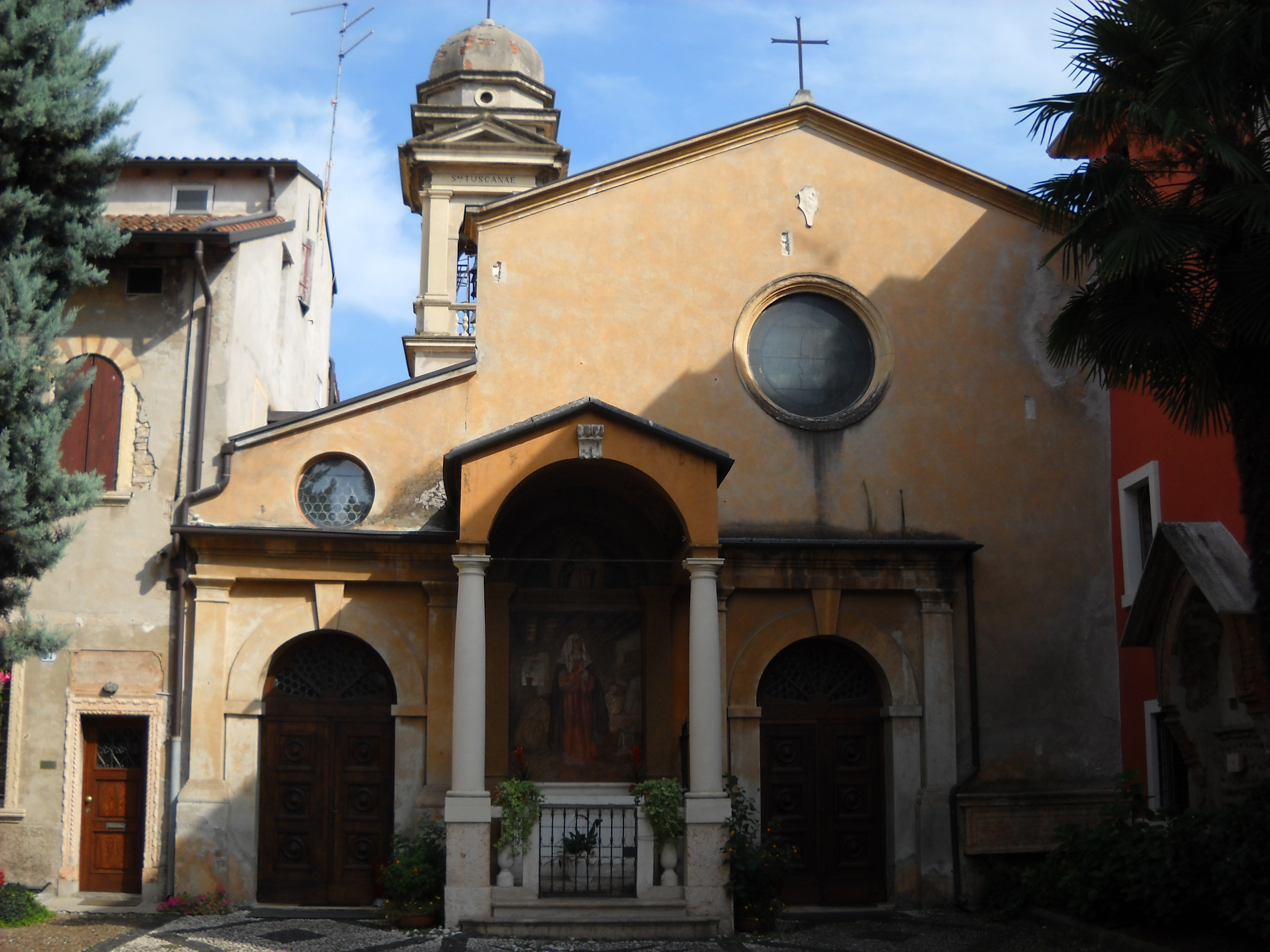
Facade of Santa Toscana

A church at the site affiliated with the Benedictine order was established in the 11th century, and was adjacent to a cemetery. It was titled then Santo Sepolcro. In 1178 it was linked to the Knights Hospitaller. In 1342, they acquired the relics of Santa Toscana which were placed in an ark atop the main altar. The church was expanded, rebuilt and reconsecrated by 1489. The church suffered bombardment during World War II.
