= Roman theatre, Verona =

Ancient Roman theatre in Verona, Italy

Coordinates: 45°26′50.7″N 11°0′5.9″E

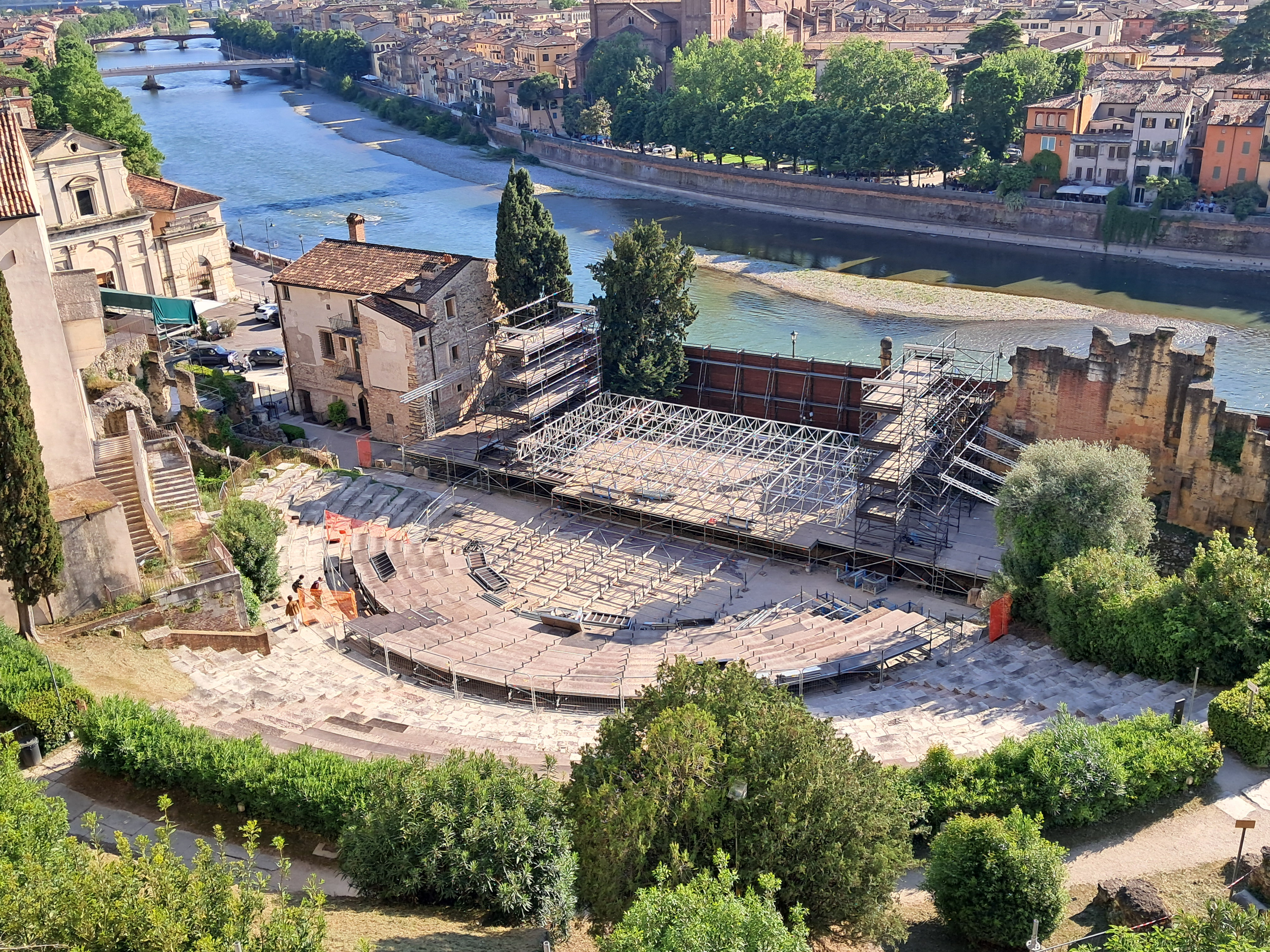
The Roman theatre of Verona in its environs Apr26

The Roman theatre of Verona (Italian: Teatro Romano di Verona) is an ancient Roman theatre in Verona, northern Italy. It is not to be confused with the Roman amphitheatre known as the Verona Arena.

== History ==
The theatre was built in the late 1st century BC. Before its construction, two walls were built alongside the Adige River, between the Ponte di Pietra and the Ponte Postumio, to protect it against floods.

Today only remains of the edifice are visible, recovered starting from around 1830. They include the cavea and the steps, several arcades of the loggias and remains of the stage. Part of the cavea was occupied by the church of S. Siro, built in the 10th century and restored in the 14th century.

At the top of the hill there was an ancient temple, built on a series of terraces.

== Mosaics and Artefacts ==
Several mosaics and artefacts are on display in the theatre's museum, including a third-century A.D. polychrome mosaic from a Roman house outside the walls of Verona in Piazza Bra. This mosaic depicts the god Bacchus with his attribute, a panther, with the inscription 'Roropes Zeta' (Roropes lives), surrounded by vine leaves and panthers.

Another third-century A.D. mosaic is on display, depicting gladiatorial scenes. This mosaic was originally located in a house in Via Diaz. Three gladiatorial combats are depicted with inscriptions stating the names of the gladiators and the outcome: in the first, a secutor defeats a retiarius; in the second, a thraex has killed Caecrops who is about to be carried away on a litter; in the third, a secutor and a retiarius are depicted but the inscription does not survive. Another panel depicts a sea-creature ridden by a Nereid.

A marble decoration featuring a young satyr on a volute decorated with a goat head also survives. Lead pipes are on display - there are large pipes from the aqueduct that crossed the Postumia Bridge, and a smaller pipe from the Via Catullo - Via Adua area which has a RPV stamp (res publica Veronensium) and the names Clodius Rufinus and Valerius Crescens.

Fragments from several sphinxes were discovered during nineteenth-century excavations, which probably marked the end of rows of seats. A single sphinx was recreated using the fragments of several different sphinxes by Andrea Monga.

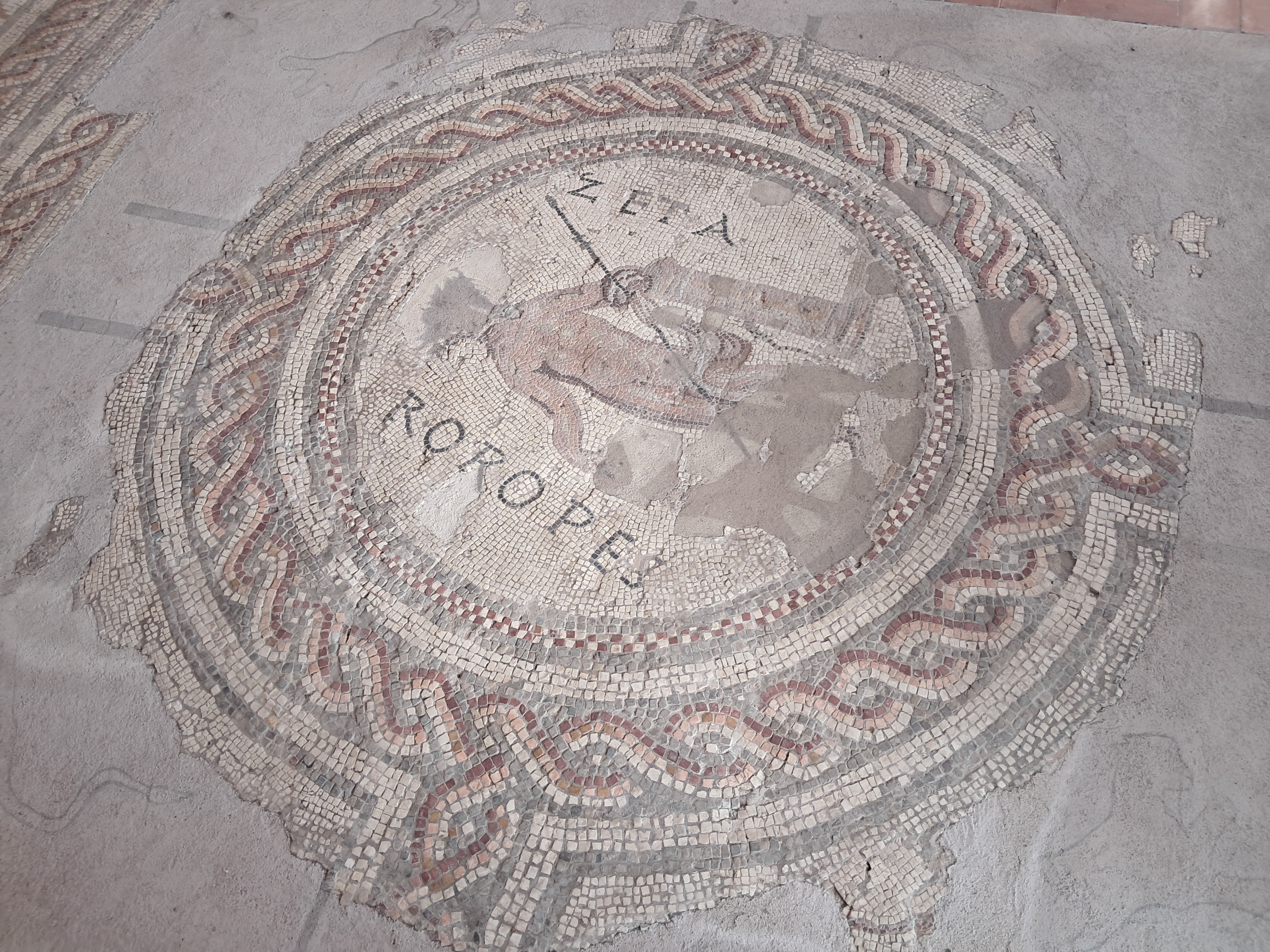
Polychrome mosaic of Bacchus (third-century A.D., Piazza Bra)

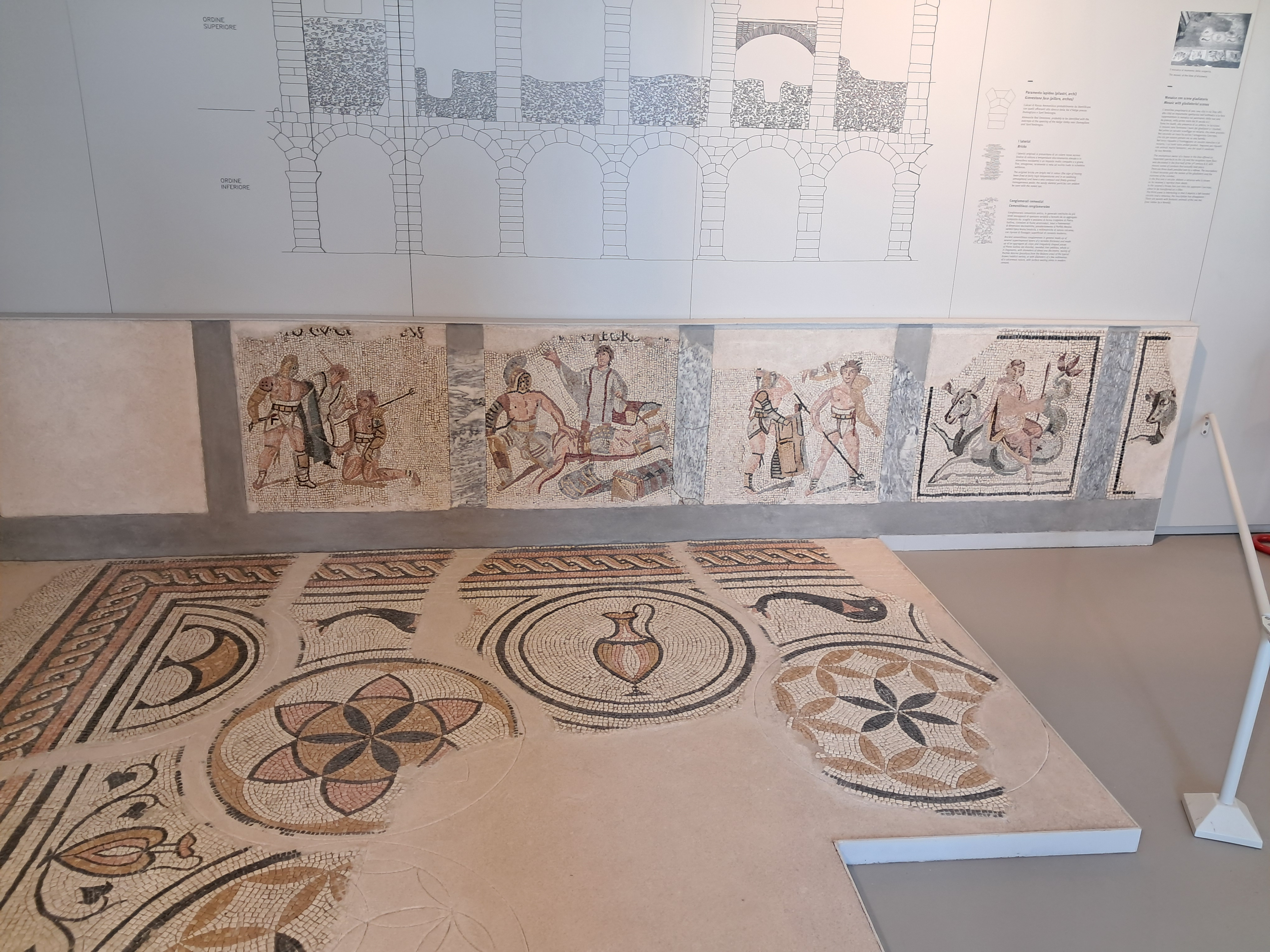
Gladiatorial mosaics (third-century A.D., Via Diaz)

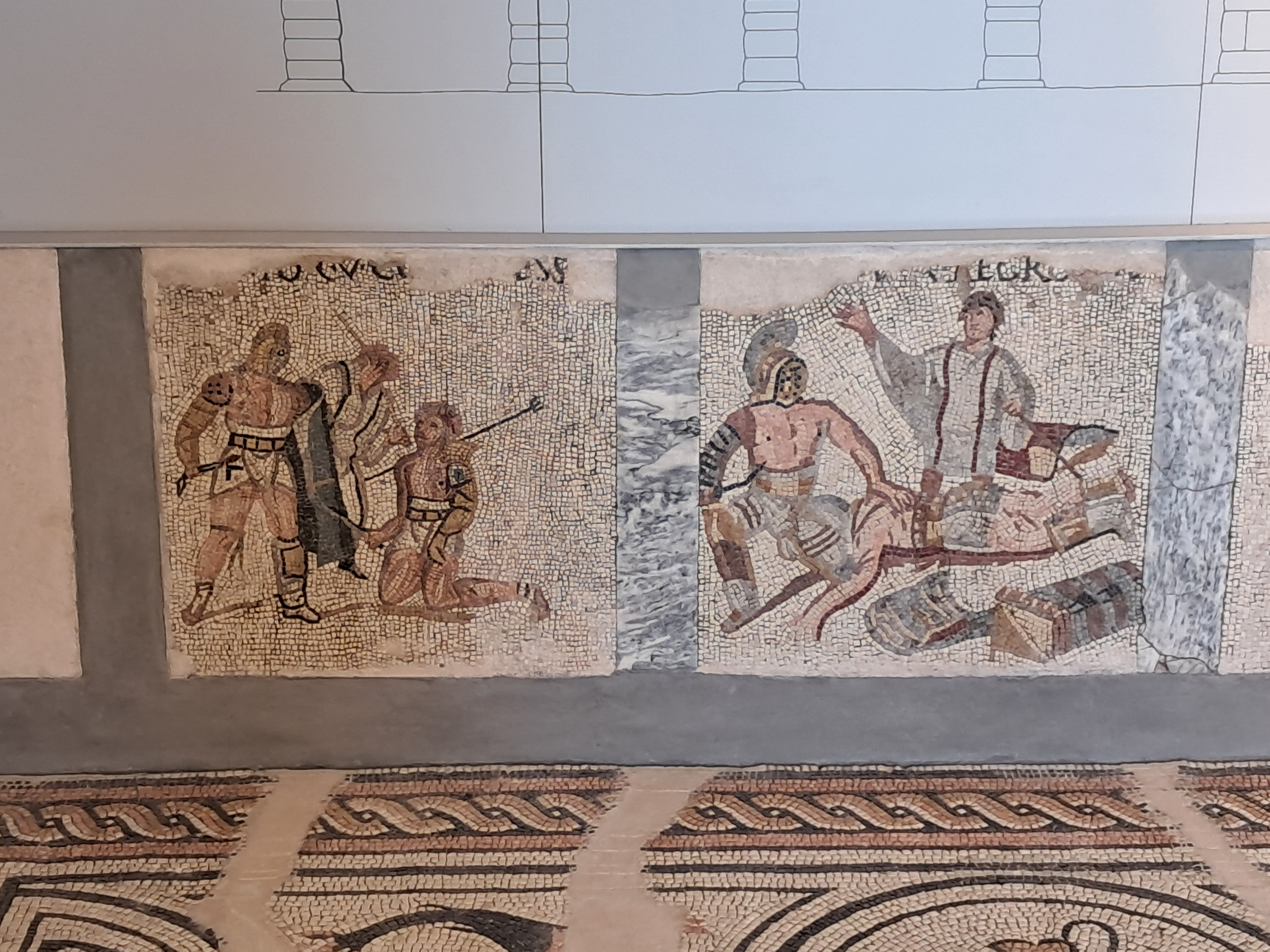
Gladiatorial mosaics (third-century A.D., Via Diaz) - close-up

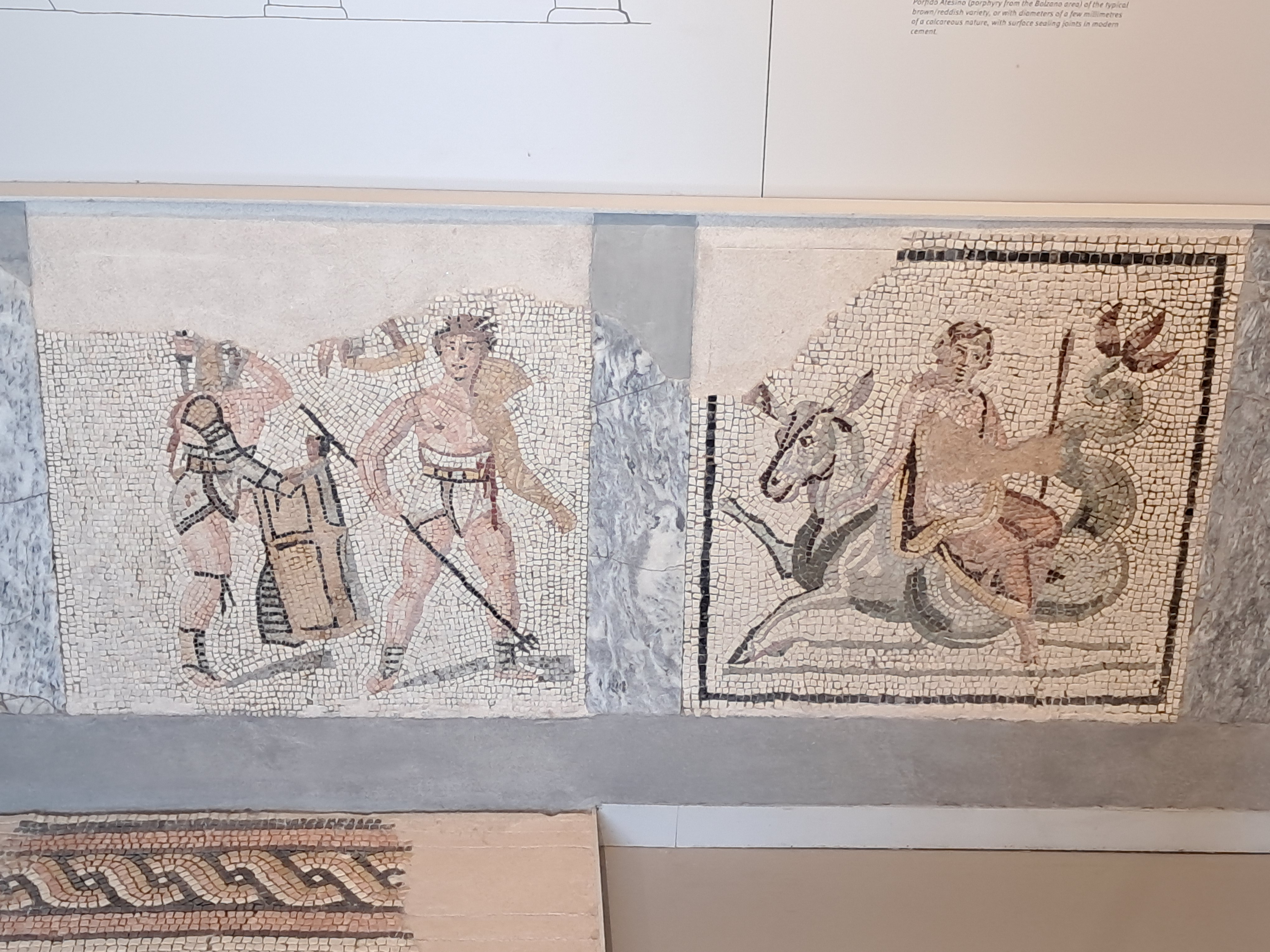
Gladiatorial mosaics (third-century A.D., Via Diaz) - close-up

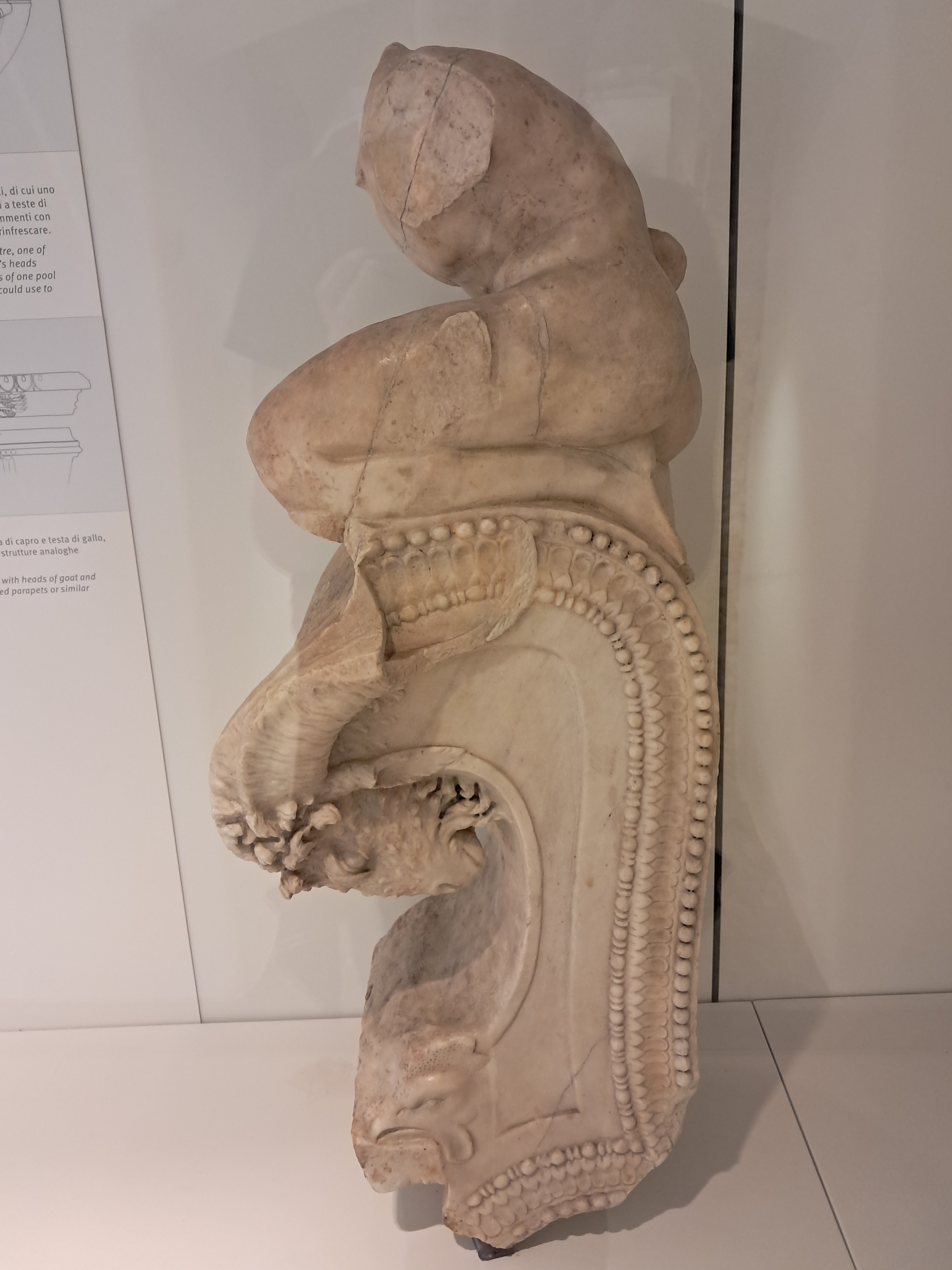
A marble decoration featuring a young satyr on a volute decorated with a goat head.

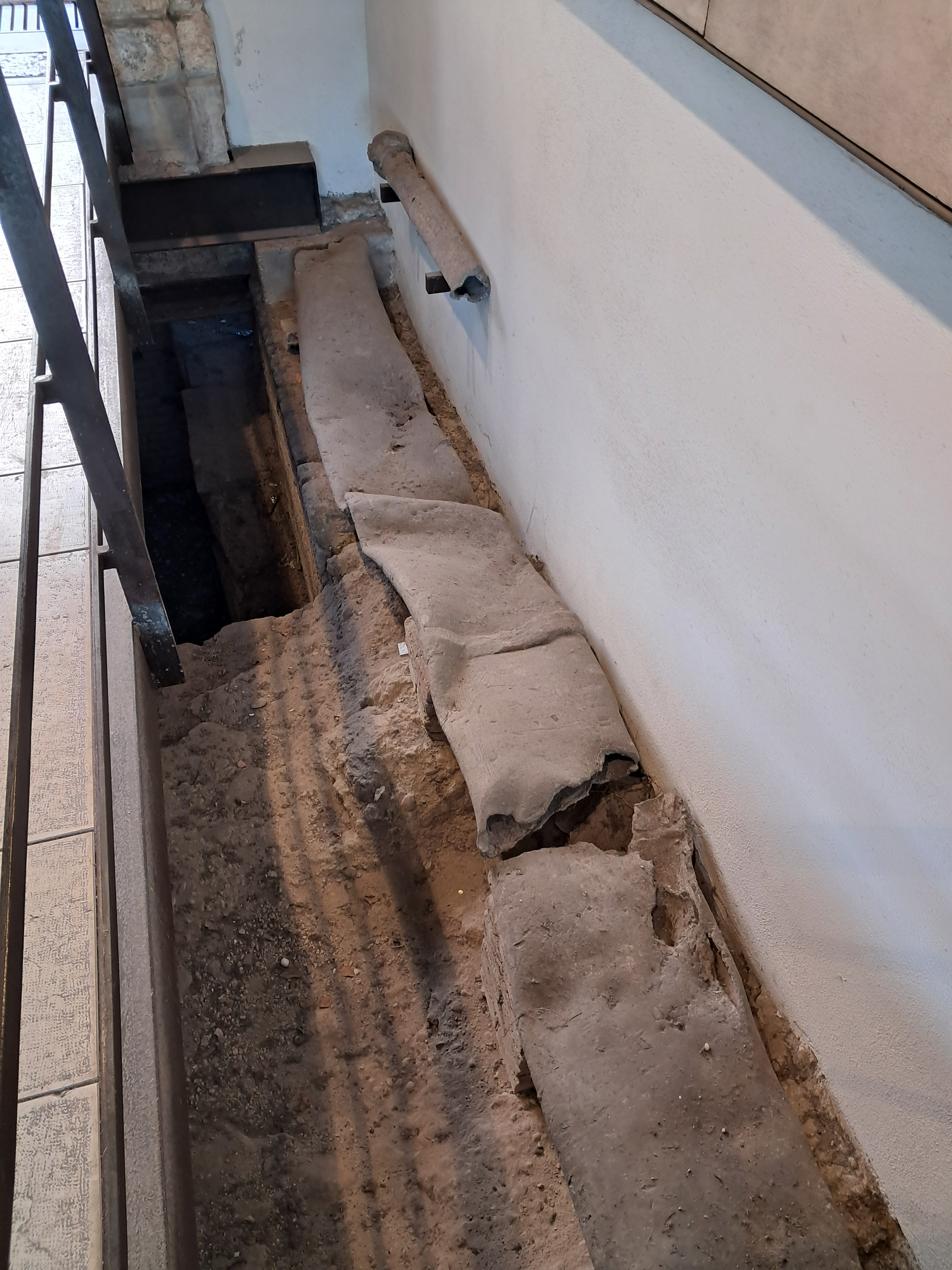
Roman lead pipes

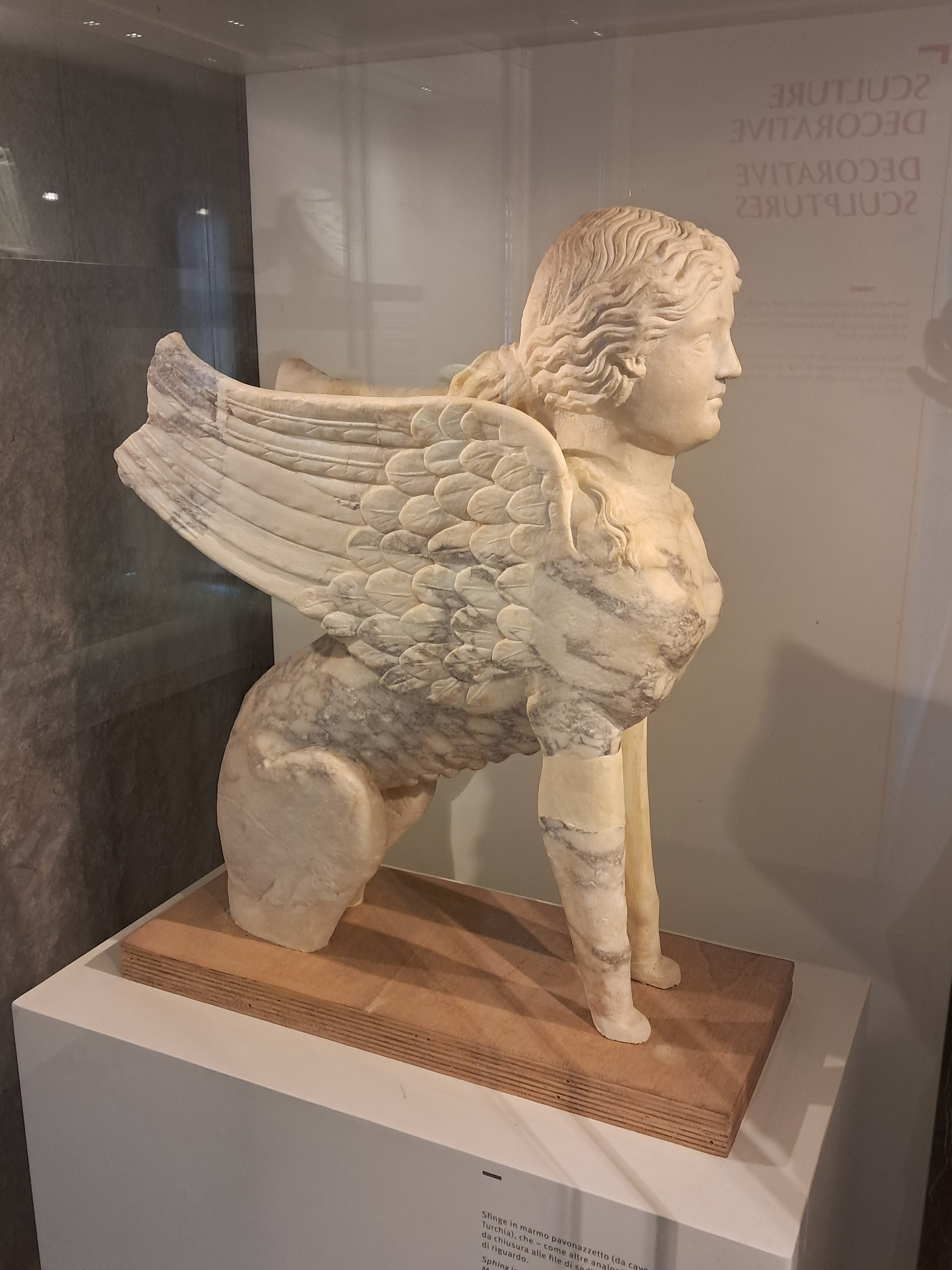
A single sphinx was recreated by Andrea Monga using the fragments of several different sphinxes.

== See also ==
- List of Roman theatres
- List of Roman sites
