= Verona =

City in Veneto, Italy

Verona Verona / Veròna (Venetian)
- Comune
- Comune di Verona
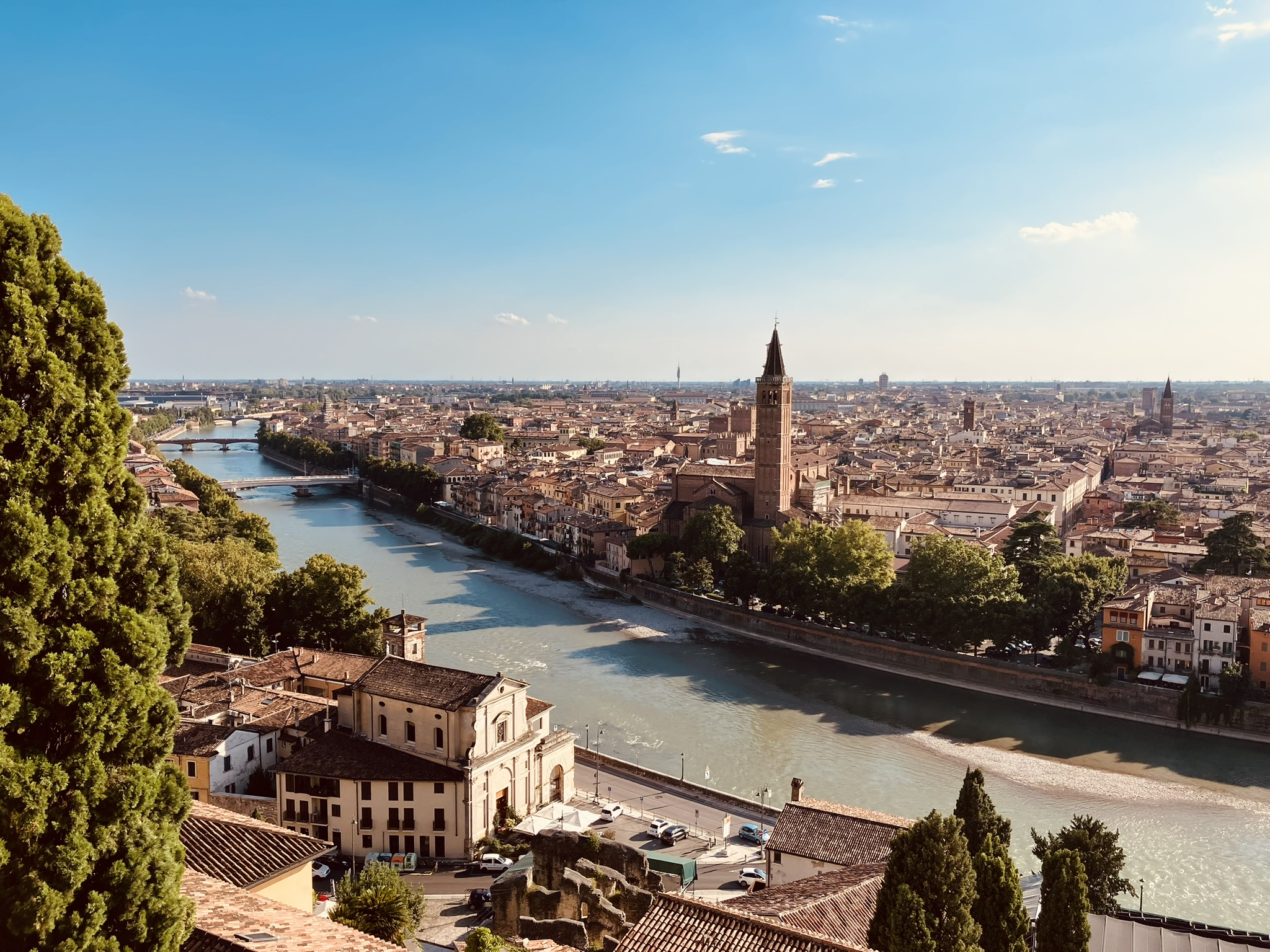
- Skyline of Verona and the Adige

- Flag Coat of arms
- Interactive map of Verona
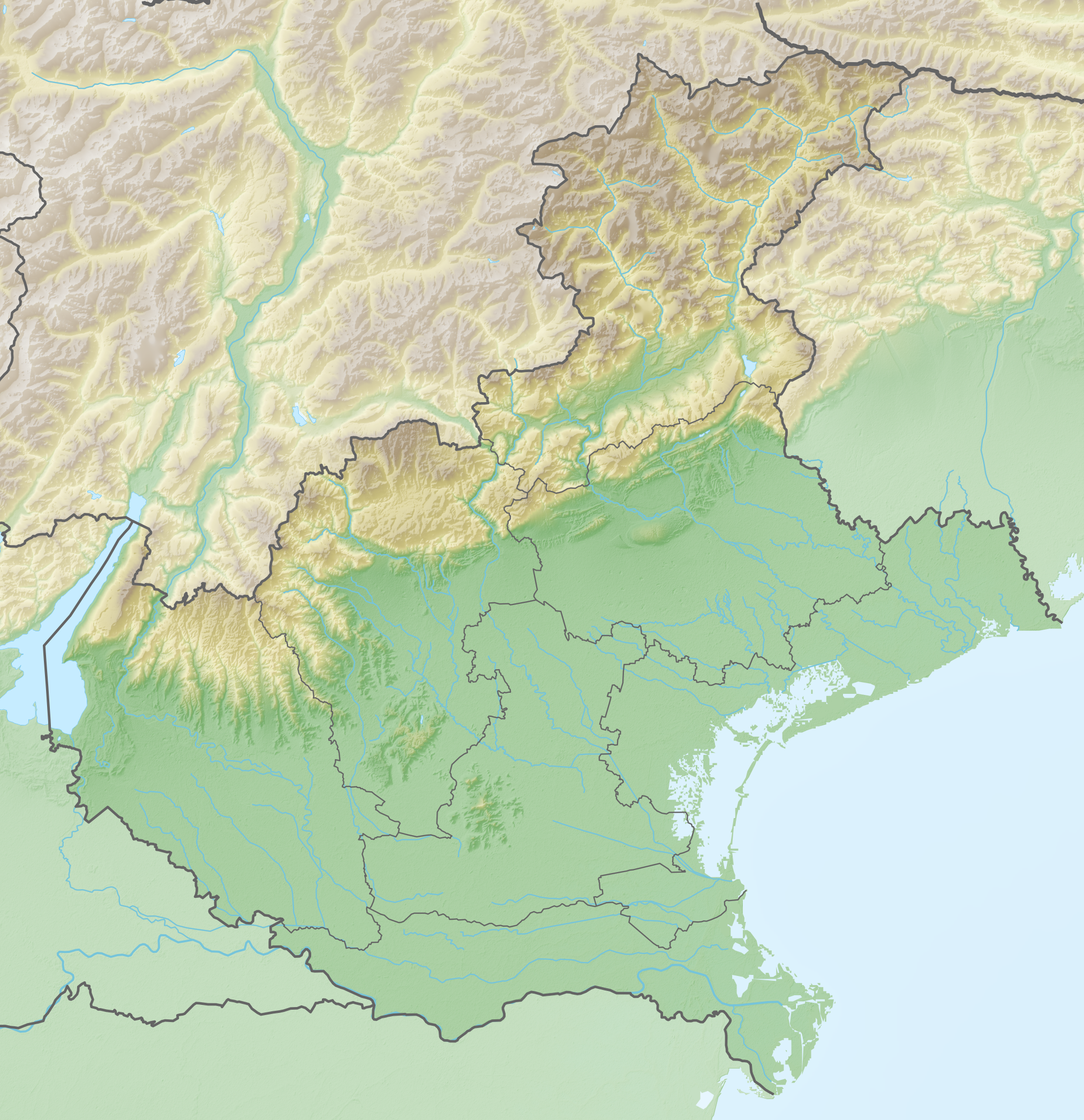
- Location within Italy Location within Veneto Location within Europe
- Coordinates: 45°26′19″N 10°59′34″E
- Country: Italy
- Region: Veneto
- Province: Verona (VR)
- Frazioni: Avesa, San Michele Extra, San Massimo all'Adige, Quinzano, Quinto di Valpantena, Poiano di Valpantena, Parona di Valpolicella, Montorio Veronese, Mizzole, Marchesino, Chievo, Cà di David e Moruri

Government
  - Mayor: Damiano Tommasi (Centre-left Independent)

Area
  - Total: 198.92 km^{2} (76.80 sq mi)
- Elevation: 59 m (194 ft)

Population (2026)
  - Total: 255,139
  - Density: 1,282.6/km^{2} (3,322.0/sq mi)
- Demonym(s): Veronese; Scaligero
- Time zone: UTC+1 (CET)
  - Summer (DST): UTC+2 (CEST)
- Postal code: 37100
- Dialing code: 045
- ISTAT code: 023091
- Patron saint: Saint Zeno of Verona
- Saint day: 12 April
- Website: www.comune.verona.it

UNESCO World Heritage Site
- Official name: City of Verona
- Criteria: Cultural: ii, iv
- Reference: 797
- Inscription: 2000 (24th Session)
- Area: 444.4 ha (1,098 acres)
- Buffer zone: 303.98 ha (751.2 acres)

Verona (/vəˈroʊnə/ və-ROH-nə; Italian: [veˈroːna]; Venetian: Verona or Veròna) is the largest city in the region of Veneto in Italy, with a population of 255,139 as of 2026. It is one of the seven provincial capitals of the region, and is also the 2nd-largest city in northeast Italy. The metropolitan area of Verona covers an area of 1,426 km^{2} (550.58 sq mi) and has a population of 714,310 inhabitants. It is one of the main tourist destinations in Northern Italy because of its artistic heritage and several annual fairs and shows as well as the opera season in the Arena, an ancient Roman amphitheater.

Between the 13th and 14th centuries, the city was ruled by the della Scala family. Under the rule of the family, in particular of Cangrande I della Scala, the city experienced great prosperity, becoming rich and powerful and was surrounded by new walls. The della Scala era is preserved in numerous monuments around Verona.

Three of William Shakespeare's plays are set in Verona: Romeo and Juliet (which also features Romeo's visit to Mantua), The Taming of the Shrew and The Two Gentlemen of Verona. Among Verona's Shakespeare-related landmarks is the Casa di Giulietta, a medieval house associated with the Cappello family. Its identification with Shakespeare's Capulets developed later, and the building was converted into a museum in the 1930s, when its courtyard balcony was added. It is unknown if Shakespeare ever visited Verona or Italy, but his plays have lured many visitors to Verona and surrounding cities. In November 2000, the city was declared a World Heritage Site by UNESCO because of its urban structure and architecture.

== History ==
=== Antiquity ===
The precise details of Verona's early history remain a mystery along with the origin of its name. One theory is that it was a city of the Euganei, who were obliged to give it up to the Cenomani (550 BC). With the conquest of the Valley of the Po, the Veronese territory became Roman about 300 BC. Verona became a Roman colonia in 89 BC. It was classified as a municipium in 49 BC, when its citizens were ascribed to the Roman tribe Poblilia or Publicia.

The city became important because it was at the intersection of several roads. Stilicho, a military commander in the Roman army, defeated Alaric and his Visigoths here in 402. In 489, Verona was conquered by the Ostrogoths, and the Gothic domination of Italy began. Theoderic the Great was said to have built a palace there. It remained under the power of the Goths throughout the Gothic War (535–552), except for a single day in 541, when the Byzantine officer Artabazes made an entrance. The defections of the Byzantine generals over booty made it possible for the Goths to regain possession of the city. In 552 the Romans under the general Valerian vainly endeavored to enter the city, but it was only when the Goths were fully overthrown that they surrendered it.

=== Medieval ===
In 569, it was taken by Alboin, King of the Lombards, in whose kingdom it was, in a sense, the second most important city. There, Alboin was "killed by his own people with the connivance of his wife" in 572. The dukes of Treviso often resided there. Adalgisus, son of Desiderius, in 774 made his last resistance in Verona to Charlemagne, who had destroyed the Lombard kingdom. Verona became the ordinary residence of the kings of Italy, the government of the city becoming hereditary in the family of Count Milo, progenitor of the counts of San Bonifacio. From 880 to 951 Berengar I and Berengar II resided there.

Under Holy Roman and Austrian rule, Verona was alternatively known in German as Bern, Welsch-Bern or Dietrichsbern. Otto I ceded to Verona the marquisate dependent on the Duchy of Bavaria, however, the increasing wealth of the burgher families eclipsed the power of the counts, and in 1135 Verona was organised as a free commune. In 1164, Verona joined with Vicenza, Padua and Treviso to create the Veronese League, which was integrated with the Lombard League in 1167 to battle against Frederick I Barbarossa. Victory was achieved at the Battle of Legnano in 1176, and the Treaty of Venice signed in 1177 followed by the Peace of Constance in 1183.

When Ezzelino III da Romano was elected podestà in 1226, he converted the office into a permanent lordship. In 1257 he caused the slaughter of 11,000 Paduans on the plain of Verona (Campi di Verona). Upon his death, the Great Council elected Mastino I della Scala as podestà, and he converted the "signoria" into a family possession, though leaving the burghers a share in the government. Failing to be re-elected podestà in 1262, he affected a coup d'état, and was acclaimed Capitano del Popolo, with the command of the communal troops. Long internal discord took place before he succeeded in establishing this new office, to which was attached the function of confirming the podestà. In 1277, Mastino della Scala was killed by the faction of the nobles.

The reign of his son Alberto della Scala as capitano (1277–1302) was a time of incessant war against the counts of San Bonifacio, who were aided by the House of Este. Of his sons, Bartolomeo, Alboino and Cangrande I della Scala (1291–1329), only the last shared the government (1308); he was great as warrior, prince, and patron of the arts; he protected Dante, Petrarch, and Giotto. By war or treaty, he brought under his control the cities of Treviso (1308), Vicenza (1311), and Padua (1328). At that time before the Black Death, the city was home to more than 40,000 people.

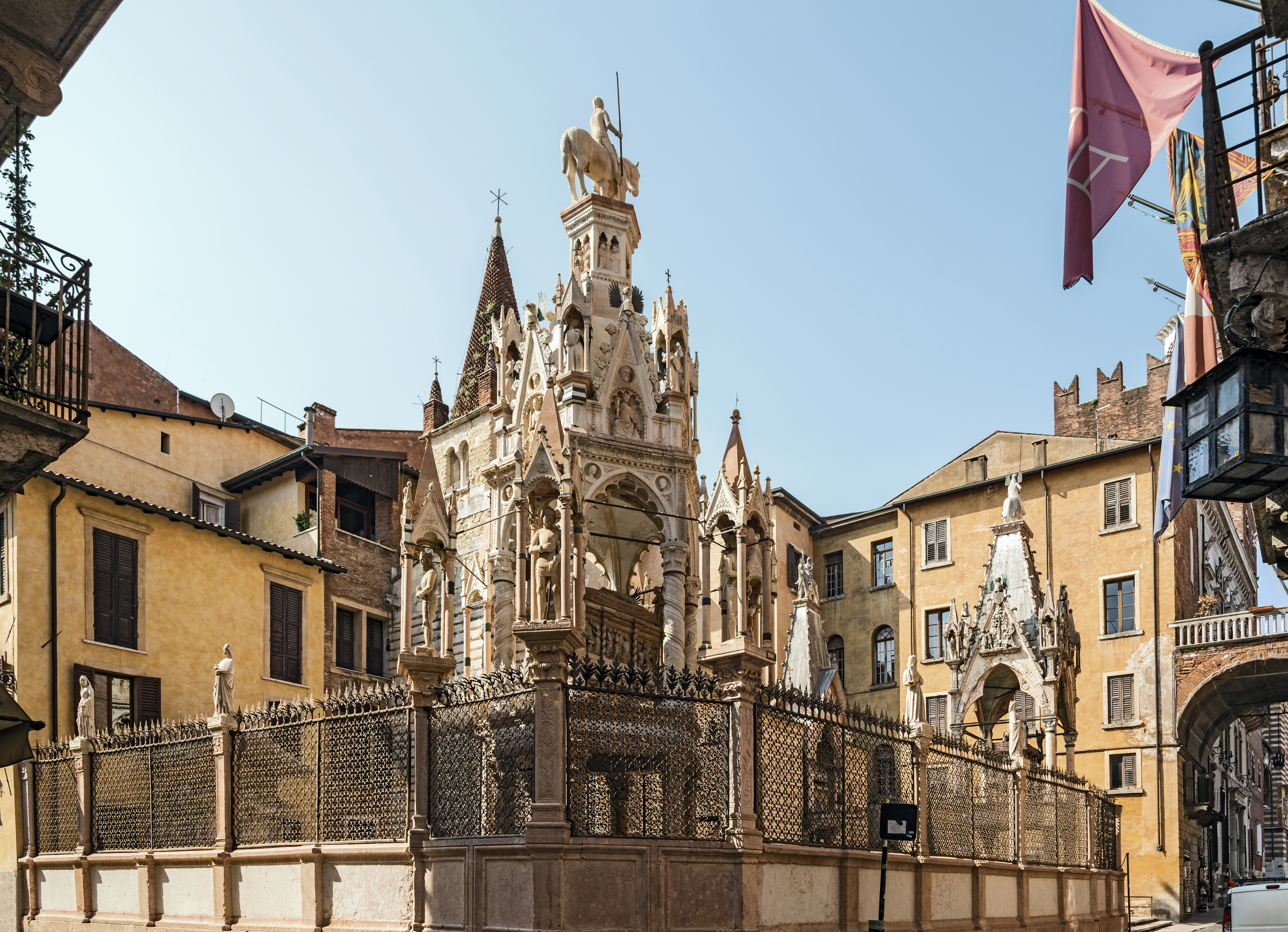
The Scaliger Tombs, tombs of the medieval lords of Verona

Cangrande was succeeded by Mastino II (1329–1351) and Alberto, sons of Alboino. Mastino continued his uncle's policy, conquering Brescia in 1332 and carrying his power beyond the Mincio. He purchased Parma (1335) and Lucca (1339). After the King of France, he was the richest prince of his time. A powerful league was formed against him in 1337 – Florence, Venice, the Visconti, the Este, and the Gonzaga.

After a three-year war, the Scaliger dominions were reduced to Verona and Vicenza (Mastino's daughter Regina-Beatrice della Scala married to Barnabò Visconti). Mastino's son Cangrande II (1351–1359) was a cruel, dissolute, and suspicious tyrant; not trusting his own subjects, he surrounded himself with Brandenburgian mercenaries. He was killed by his brother Cansignorio (1359–1375), who beautified the city with palaces, provided it with aqueducts and bridges, and founded the state treasury.

He also killed his other brother, Paolo Alboino. Fratricide seems to have become a family custom, for Antonio (1375–1387), Cansignorio's natural brother, slew his brother Bartolomeo, thereby arousing the indignation of the people, who deserted him when Gian Galeazzo Visconti of Milan made war on him. Having exhausted all his resources, he fled from Verona at midnight on 19 October 1387, thus putting an end to the Scaliger domination, which, however, survived in its monuments.

The year 1387 is also the year of the Battle of Castagnaro, fought between Giovanni Ordelaffi for Verona and John Hawkwood for Padua. Padua emerged as the winner.

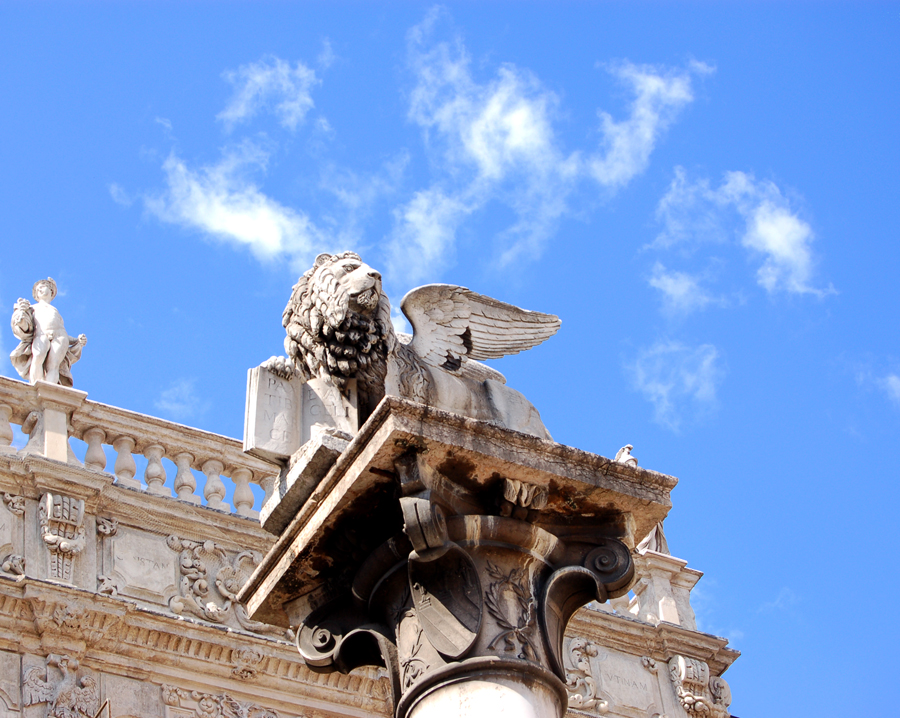
The Lion of Saint Mark, located in Piazza delle Erbe, the symbol of the Venetian Republic

Antonio's son Canfrancesco attempted in vain to recover Verona (1390). Guglielmo (1404), natural son of Cangrande II, was more fortunate; with the support of the people and the Carraresi, he drove out the Milanese, but he died ten days after. After a period of Cararrese rule, Verona submitted to Venice (1405). The last representatives of the Scaligeri lived at the imperial court and repeatedly attempted to recover Verona by the aid of popular risings.

=== Early modern ===
From 1508 to 1517, the city was in the power of the Emperor Maximilian I. There were numerous outbreaks of the plague, and in 1629–1633, Italy was struck by its worst outbreak in modern times. Around 33,000 people died in Verona (over 60% of the population at the time) in 1630–1631.

In 1776, a method of bellringing was developed called Veronese bellringing art. Verona was occupied by Napoleon in 1797, but on Easter Monday the populace rose and drove out the French. It was then that Napoleon made an end of the Venetian Republic. Verona became Austrian territory when Napoleon signed the Treaty of Campo Formio in October 1797. The Austrians took control of the city on 18 January 1798. It was taken from Austria by the Treaty of Pressburg in 1805 and became part of Napoleon's Kingdom of Italy, but was returned to Austria following Napoleon's defeat in 1814, when it became part of the Austrian-held Kingdom of Lombardy–Venetia.

The Congress of Verona, which met on 20 October 1822, was part of the series of international conferences or congresses, opening with the Congress of Vienna in 1814–1815, that marked the continuing enforcement of the "Concert of Europe".

In 1866, following the Third Italian War of Independence, Verona, along with the rest of Venetia, became part of a united Italy.

The advent of fascism added another dark chapter to the annals of Verona. Throughout Italy, the Jewish population was hit by the Manifesto of Race, a series of anti-Semitic laws passed in 1938, and after the invasion by Nazi Germany in 1943, deportations to Nazi concentration camps. An Austrian Fort (now a church, the Santuario della Madonna di Lourdes), was used to incarcerate and torture Allied troops, Jews and anti-fascists, especially after 1943, when Verona became part of the Italian Social Republic.

During Austrian rule Verona became of great strategic importance to the regime. Galeazzo Ciano, Benito Mussolini's son-in-law, was accused of plotting against the republic; in a show trial staged in January 1944 by the Nazi and fascist hierarchy at Castelvecchio (the Verona trial), Ciano was executed on the banks of the Adige with many other officers on what is today Via Colombo. This marked another turning point in the escalation of violence that would only end with the final liberation by allied troops and partisans on 26 April 1945.

=== Contemporary ===
After World War II, as Italy joined the NATO alliance, Verona once again acquired its strategic importance, due to its geographical closeness to the Iron Curtain. The city became the seat of SETAF (South European Allied Terrestrial Forces) and had during the whole duration of the Cold War period a strong military presence, especially American, which has since decreased.

== Geography ==
=== Climate ===
Verona has a humid subtropical climate characteristic of Northern Italy's inland plains, with hot summers and cool, humid winters, even though Lake Garda has a partial influence on the city. The relative humidity is high throughout the year, especially in winter when it causes fog, mainly from dusk until late morning, although the phenomenon has become less and less frequent in recent years.

Climate data for Verona (Villafranca Airport) (1991–2020 normals, extremes 1946–present)
| Month | Jan | Feb | Mar | Apr | May | Jun | Jul | Aug | Sep | Oct | Nov | Dec | Year |
|---|---|---|---|---|---|---|---|---|---|---|---|---|---|
| Record high °C (°F) | 19.8 (67.6) | 22.1 (71.8) | 27.2 (81.0) | 31.8 (89.2) | 36.6 (97.9) | 38.1 (100.6) | 38.2 (100.8) | 39.0 (102.2) | 33.2 (91.8) | 29.2 (84.6) | 23.6 (74.5) | 18.8 (65.8) | 39.0 (102.2) |
| Mean maximum °C (°F) | 11.4 (52.5) | 13.9 (57.0) | 18.8 (65.8) | 22.8 (73.0) | 27.6 (81.7) | 32.5 (90.5) | 34.6 (94.3) | 34.2 (93.6) | 29.3 (84.7) | 23.0 (73.4) | 16.3 (61.3) | 11.6 (52.9) | 35.4 (95.7) |
| Mean daily maximum °C (°F) | 7.3 (45.1) | 10.0 (50.0) | 14.9 (58.8) | 19.1 (66.4) | 24.1 (75.4) | 28.2 (82.8) | 30.4 (86.7) | 30.4 (86.7) | 25.4 (77.7) | 19.1 (66.4) | 12.6 (54.7) | 7.8 (46.0) | 19.1 (66.4) |
| Daily mean °C (°F) | 2.9 (37.2) | 4.5 (40.1) | 9.1 (48.4) | 13.2 (55.8) | 18.4 (65.1) | 22.7 (72.9) | 24.9 (76.8) | 24.6 (76.3) | 19.6 (67.3) | 13.9 (57.0) | 8.4 (47.1) | 3.6 (38.5) | 13.8 (56.9) |
| Mean daily minimum °C (°F) | −0.5 (31.1) | 0.1 (32.2) | 3.9 (39.0) | 7.6 (45.7) | 12.5 (54.5) | 16.9 (62.4) | 18.9 (66.0) | 18.7 (65.7) | 14.2 (57.6) | 9.5 (49.1) | 4.8 (40.6) | 0.2 (32.4) | 8.9 (48.0) |
| Mean minimum °C (°F) | −5.1 (22.8) | −4.1 (24.6) | −1.2 (29.8) | 2.4 (36.3) | 7.3 (45.1) | 11.7 (53.1) | 14.1 (57.4) | 14.0 (57.2) | 9.8 (49.6) | 4.7 (40.5) | −0.5 (31.1) | −4.2 (24.4) | −6.4 (20.5) |
| Record low °C (°F) | −18.4 (−1.1) | −18.4 (−1.1) | −10.4 (13.3) | −2.2 (28.0) | 0.0 (32.0) | 3.8 (38.8) | 7.3 (45.1) | 8.1 (46.6) | 2.0 (35.6) | −4.6 (23.7) | −7.9 (17.8) | −15.5 (4.1) | −18.4 (−1.1) |
| Average precipitation mm (inches) | 42.7 (1.68) | 45.4 (1.79) | 45.1 (1.78) | 72.3 (2.85) | 81.9 (3.22) | 72.2 (2.84) | 62.9 (2.48) | 71.8 (2.83) | 90.9 (3.58) | 85.8 (3.38) | 95.9 (3.78) | 64.6 (2.54) | 831.7 (32.74) |
| Average precipitation days (≥ 1.0 mm) | 5.9 | 5.5 | 5.6 | 8.7 | 8.4 | 8.4 | 5.2 | 5.9 | 6.7 | 7.7 | 8.7 | 7.2 | 82.0 |
| Average relative humidity (%) | 82.1 | 75.3 | 71.8 | 71.1 | 70.2 | 70.1 | 70.1 | 71.6 | 73.5 | 79.3 | 83.1 | 82.7 | 77 |
| Average dew point °C (°F) | 0.5 (32.9) | 0.6 (33.1) | 3.9 (39.0) | 7.6 (45.7) | 12.1 (53.8) | 16.1 (61.0) | 18.2 (64.8) | 18.6 (65.5) | 14.6 (58.3) | 10.9 (51.6) | 6.2 (43.2) | 1.39 (34.50) | 9.22 (48.62) |
| Mean monthly sunshine hours | 91.3 | 131.1 | 181.5 | 184.1 | 237.7 | 259.5 | 307.6 | 278.8 | 203.6 | 129.4 | 85.4 | 87.4 | 2,177.4 |
Source 1: Istituto Superiore per la Protezione e la Ricerca Ambientale (monthly max-precipitation and days)
Source 2: NOAA (daily mean-monthly min-humidity-dew point) (Sun 1981–2010), Servizio Meteorologico (extremes)

== Demographics ==
Historical population
| Year | Pop. | ±% |
|---|---|---|
| 1871 | 86,443 | — |
| 1881 | 89,784 | +3.9% |
| 1901 | 99,579 | +10.9% |
| 1911 | 116,518 | +17.0% |
| 1921 | 131,711 | +13.0% |
| 1931 | 145,863 | +10.7% |
| 1936 | 153,555 | +5.3% |
| 1951 | 178,382 | +16.2% |
| 1961 | 220,972 | +23.9% |
| 1971 | 266,205 | +20.5% |
| 1981 | 265,932 | −0.1% |
| 1991 | 255,824 | −3.8% |
| 2001 | 253,208 | −1.0% |
| 2011 | 252,520 | −0.3% |
| 2021 | 255,985 | +1.4% |
Source: ISTAT

As of 2026, the population is 255,139, of which 48.0% are males, and 52.0% are females. Minors make up 13.9% of the population, and seniors make up 26.5%.

=== Immigration ===
As of 2025, immigrants make up 17.3% of the population. The 5 largest foreign countries of birth are Sri Lanka, Romania, Moldova, Albania, and Morocco.

== Government ==
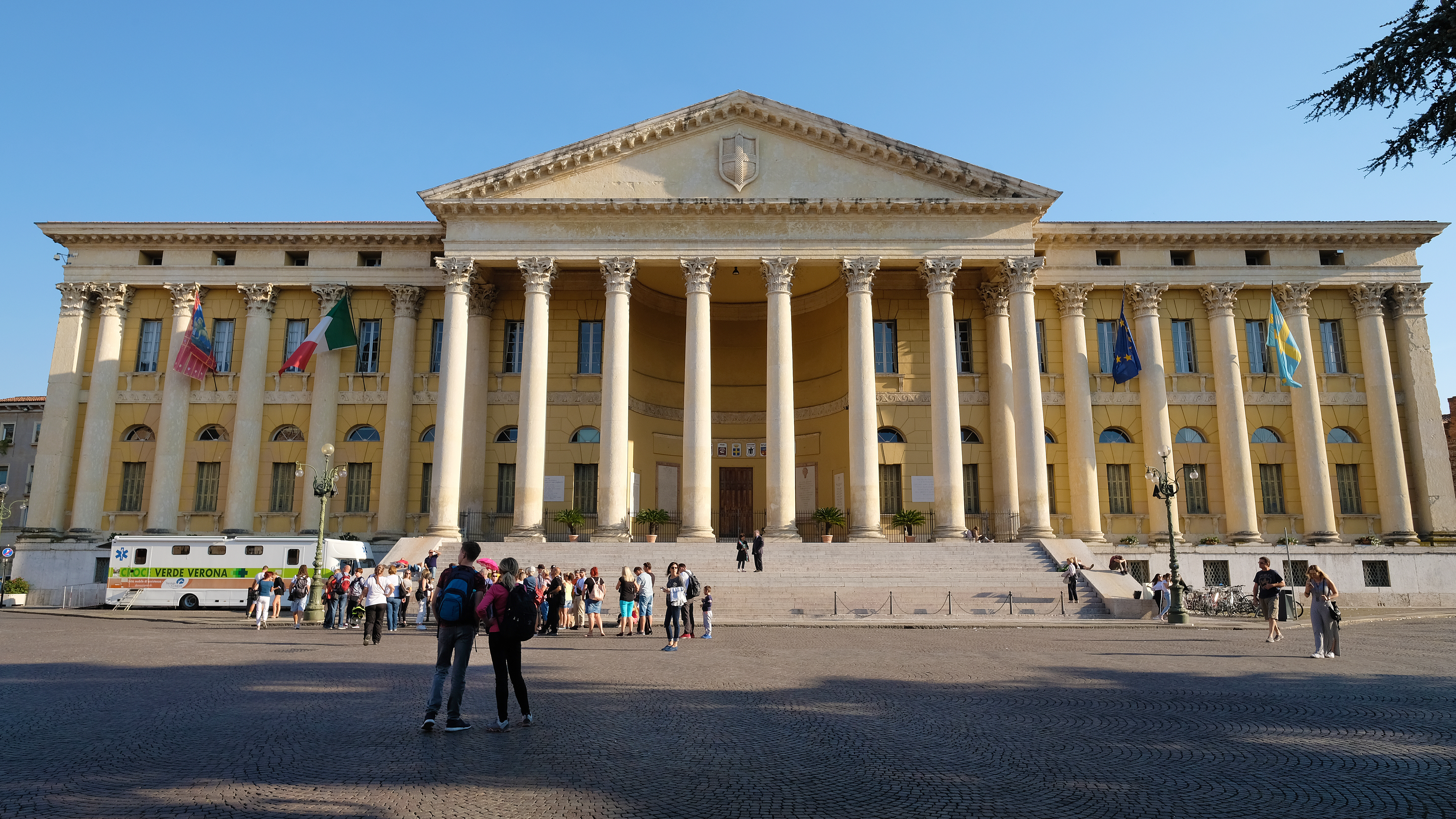
Palazzo Barbieri is Verona's city hall.

Since the local government political reorganization in 1993, Verona has been governed by the City Council of Verona, which is based in Palazzo Barbieri. Voters elect directly 33 councilors and the mayor of Verona every five years.

Verona is also the capital of its own province. The Provincial Council is seated in Palazzo del Governo. The current mayor of Verona is Damiano Tommasi, elected in June 2022.

Verona has traditionally been a right-wing traditionalist Catholic city, reflecting its former status as one of the major cities of Italian Social Republic, and the right-wing politics of the Veneto region. In October 2018, Verona became the first city in Italy to declare itself pro-life, and hosted the American Christian right lobby group World Congress of Families' conference in 2019.

Despite this, since the mayors became directly elected in 1994, Verona has elected two left-wing mayors - Paolo Zanotto in 2002 and current mayor Damiano Tommasi in 2022, largely due to incumbent mayor Federico Sboarina's refusal to include center-right parties in his right-wing coalition.

== Main sights ==
Because of the value and importance of its many historical buildings, Verona has been inscribed on the UNESCO World Heritage List as the site City of Verona: a UNESCO World Heritage Site for its Monuments. Verona preserved many ancient Roman monuments, including the magnificent Arena, in the early Middle Ages. Many of its early medieval edifices were destroyed or heavily damaged by the earthquake of 3 January 1117, which led to a massive Romanesque rebuilding. The Carolingian period poem Versus de Verona contains an important description of Verona in the early medieval era.

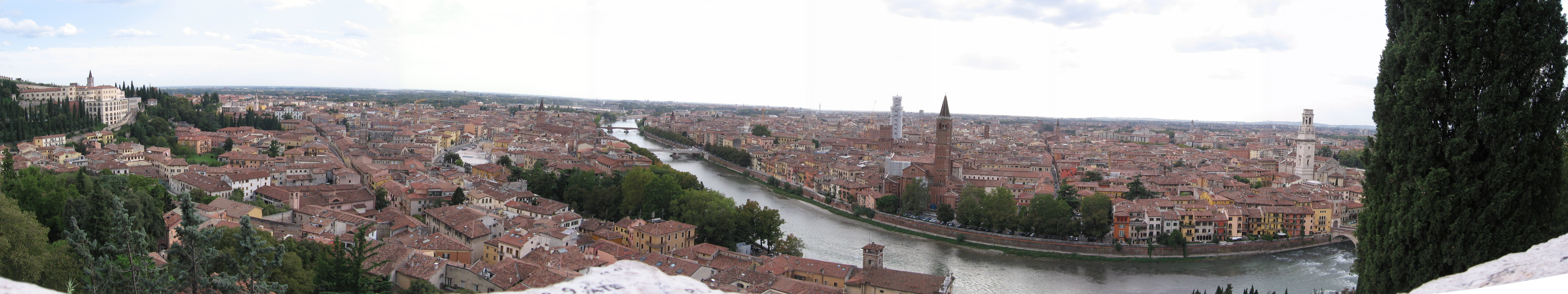
A panoramic view of Verona from Castel San Pietro

=== Roman edifices ===
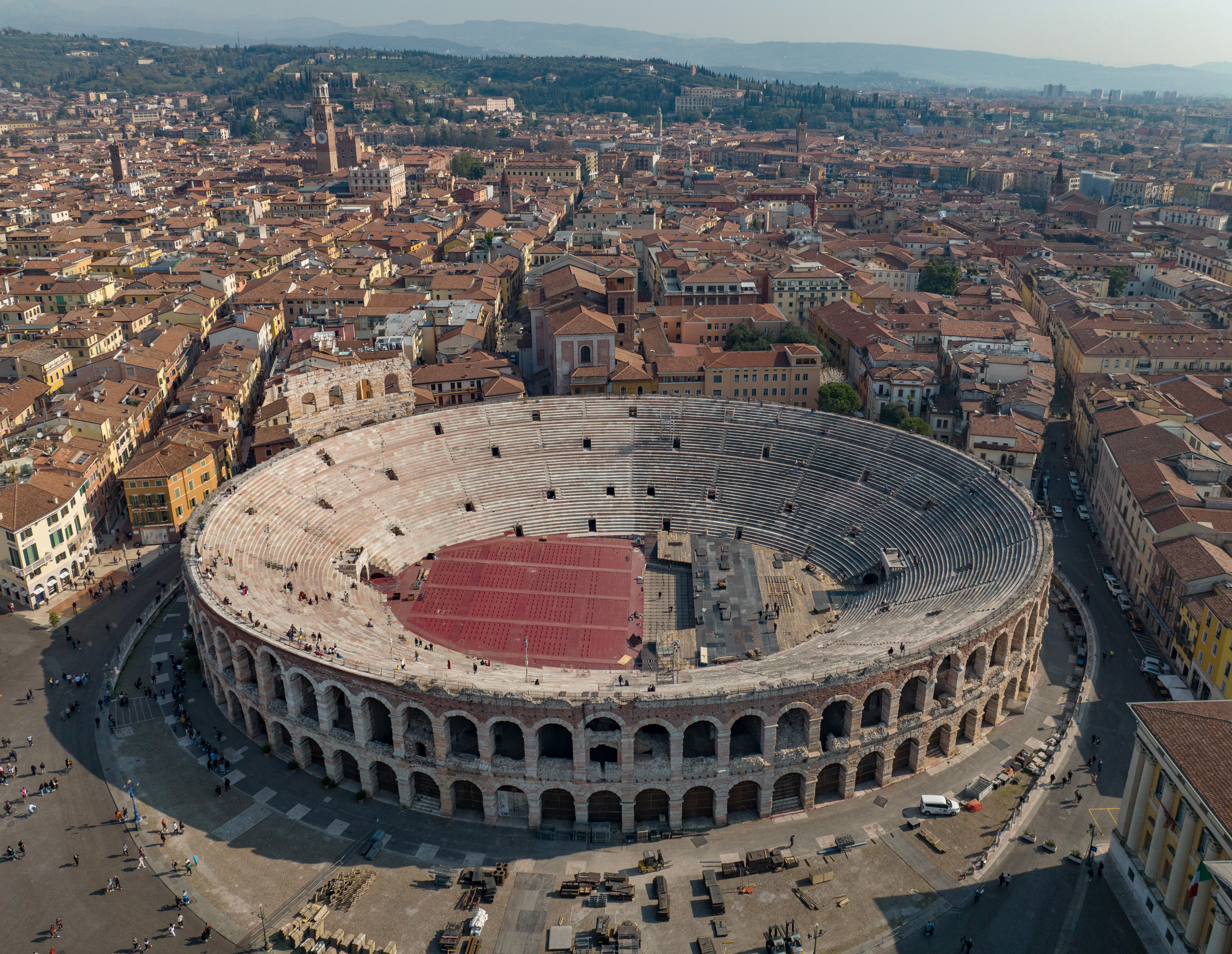
Verona Arena

The Roman military settlement in what is now the center of the city was to expand through the cardines and decumani that intersect at right angles. This structure has been kept to the present day and is clearly visible from the air. Further development has not reshaped the original map. Though the Roman city with its basalt-paved roads is mostly hidden from view it stands virtually intact about 6 m (20 ft) below the surface. Most palazzi and houses have cellars built on Roman structures that are rarely accessible to visitors.

Verona is famous for its Roman amphitheater, the Arena, found in the city's largest piazza, the Piazza Bra. Completed around 30 AD, it is the third-largest in Italy after Rome's Colosseum and the Amphitheatre of Capua. It measures 139 meters (456 ft) long and 110 meters (360 ft) wide, and could seat some 25,000 spectators in its 44 tiers of marble seats. The ludi (shows and gladiator games) performed within its walls were so famous that they attracted spectators from far beyond the city.

The current two-story façade is the internal support for the tiers. Only a fragment of the original outer perimeter wall in white and pink limestone from Valpolicella, with three stories remains. The interior is very impressive and is virtually intact, and has remained in use even today for public events, fairs, theatre, and open-aired opera during warm summer nights.

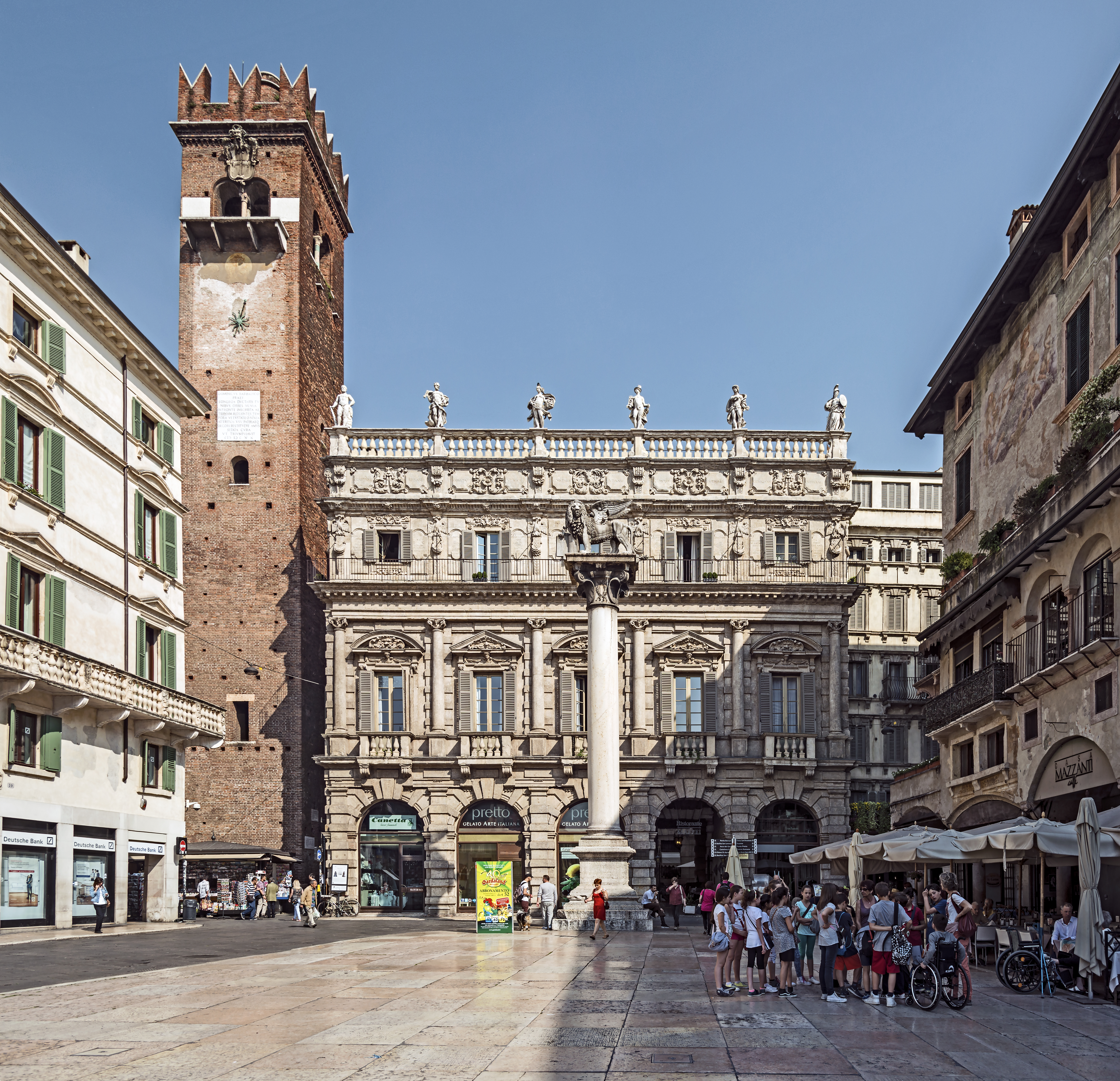
Piazza delle Erbe

Piazza delle Erbe, near the Roman forum was rebuilt by Cangrande I and Cansignorio della Scala I, lords of Verona, using material (such as marble blocks and statues) from Roman spas and villas.

There is also a variety of other Roman monuments to be found in the town, such as the Roman theatre of Verona. This theatre was built in the 1st century BC, but through the ages had fallen in disuse and had been built upon to provide housing. In the 18th century Andrea Monga, a wealthy Veronese, bought all the houses that in time had been built over the theatre, demolished them, and saved the monument. Not far from it is the Ponte di Pietra ("Stone Wall Bridge"), another Roman landmark that has survived to this day.

The Arco dei Gavi was built in the 1st century AD and is famous for having the name of the builder (architect Lucius Vitruvius Cordone) engraved on it, a rare case in the architecture of the epoque. It originally straddled the main Roman road into the city, now Corso Cavour. It was demolished by French troops in 1805 and rebuilt in 1932.

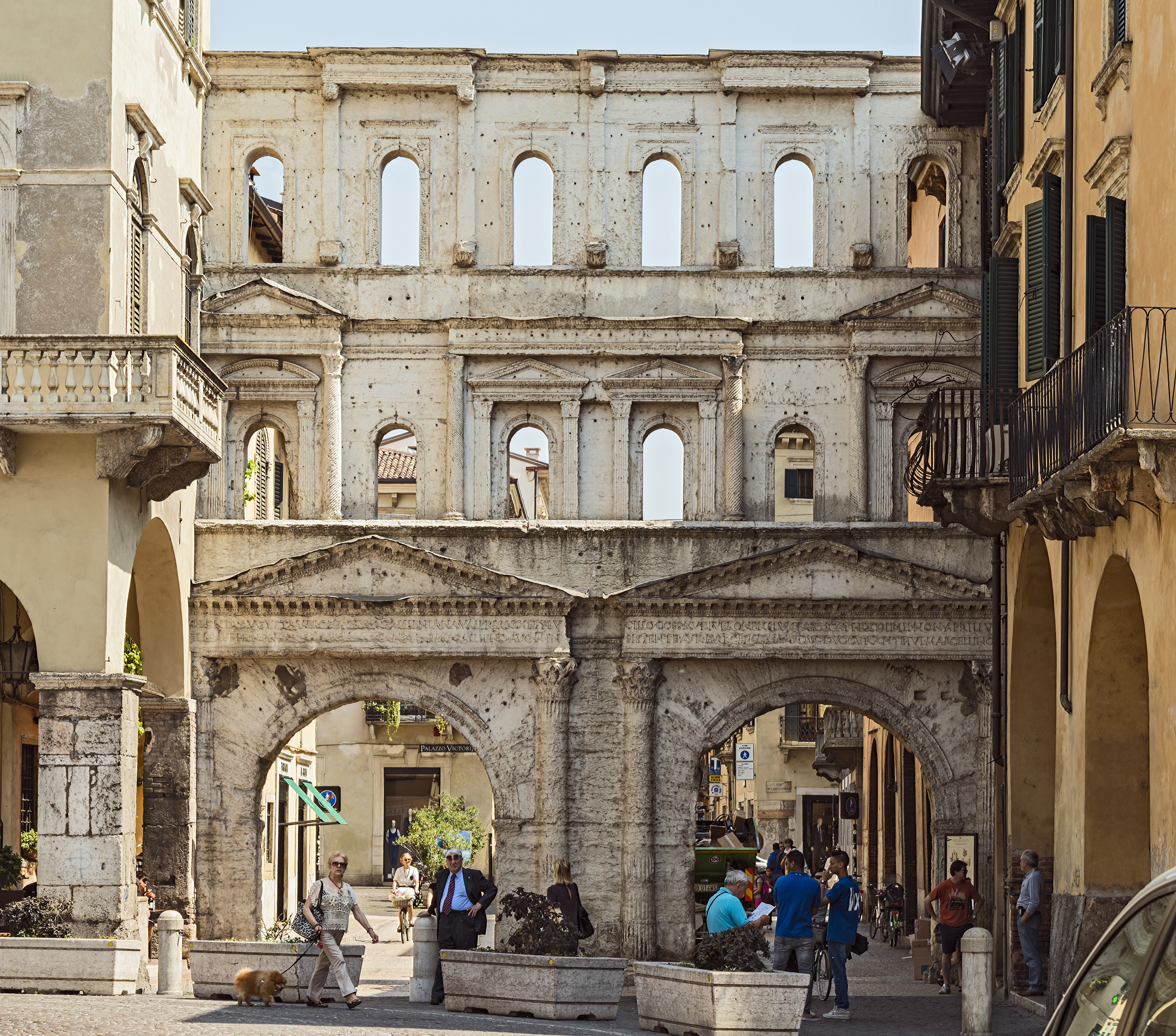
Porta Borsari

Nearby is the Porta Borsari, an archway at the end of Corso Porta Borsari. This is the façade of a 3rd-century gate in the original Roman city walls. The inscription is dated 245 AD and gives the city name as Colonia Verona Augusta. Corso Porta Borsari, the road passing through the gate is the original Via Sacra of the Roman city. Today, it is lined with several Renaissance palazzi and the ancient Church of Santi Apostoli, a few meters from Piazza delle Erbe.

Porta Leoni is the 1st century BC ruin of what was once part of the Roman city gate. A substantial portion is still standing as part of the wall of a medieval building. The street itself is an open archaeological site, and the remains of the original Roman street and gateway foundations can be seen a few feet below the present street level. As can be seen from there, the gate contains a small court guarded by towers. Here, carriages and travelers were inspected before entering or leaving the city.

The Santo Stefano church is dedicated to the first Christian martyr, was erected in the Paleochristian era, and houses the burials of the first bishops of Verona. Throughout the centuries Saint Stephen underwent complex architectural transformations. Particularly striking is the rare two-story ambulatory, probably built to give pilgrims visual access to the abundant collection of important relics for which the church was famous. Also to be visited is the cruciform crypt with its forest of columns, arches, and cross vaults. Saint Stephen was the first Christian martyr and, according to the Acts of the Apostles, was stoned just outside Jerusalem, in a place still remembered today, near the so-called "Porta Leoni".

=== Medieval architecture ===
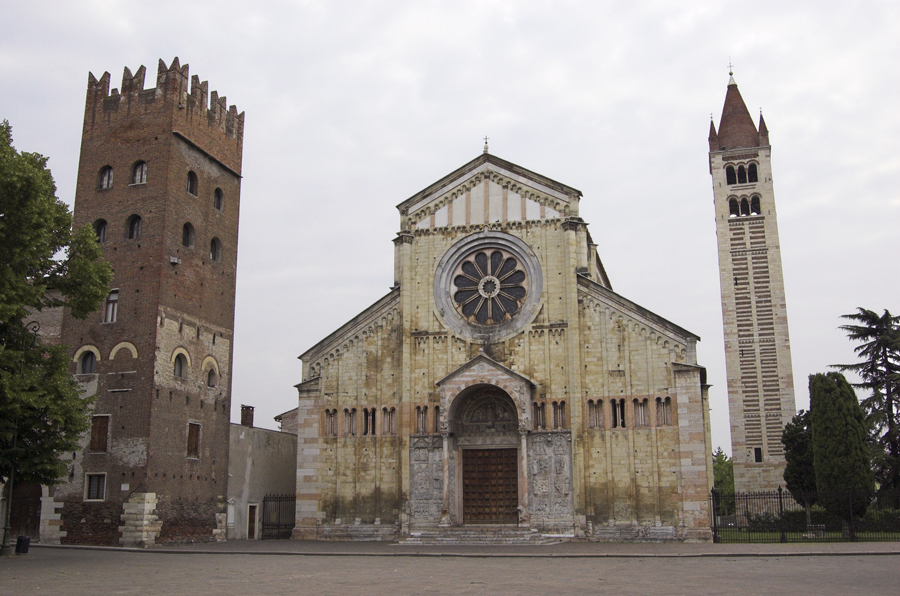
San Zeno Basilica, like many other Veronese churches, is built with alternating layers of white stone and bricks.

The Basilica of San Zeno Maggiore is a Romanesque style church, the third such structure on its site, built from 1123 to 1135, over the 4th-century shrine to Verona's patron saint, St. Zeno, the bishop of Verona from 362 to 380, when he died. The façade dominates the large square, and is flanked with a 72-meter-tall (236 ft) bell tower, which is mentioned by Dante in Canto 18 of Purgatory in the Divine Comedy. The weathered Veronese stone gives a warm golden glow, and the restrained lines of the pillars, columns, and cornices, and the gallery with its double windows, give the façade an air of harmonious elegance.

The huge rose window is decorated as a Wheel of Fortune. The lintels above the portal have carvings of the months of the year. Each side of the doorway is embellished with 18 bas-relief panels of biblical scenes. The inner bronze door panels have 48 primitive but forceful depictions of Biblical scenes and episodes from the life of St Zeno. The meaning of some of the scenes is now unknown, but the extraordinarily vivid energy of the figures is a superb blend of traditional and Ottonian influences.

The interior of the church is divided into the Lower Church, occupying about two-thirds of the structure, and the Upper Church, occupying the remainder. The walls are covered with 12th and 14th century frescos and the ceiling of the nave is a magnificent example of a ship's keel ceiling. The vaulted crypt contains the tomb of St. Zeno, the first Bishop of Verona, as well as the tombs of several other saints. North of the church is a pleasant cloister. The church also houses the tomb of King Pippin of Italy (777–810).

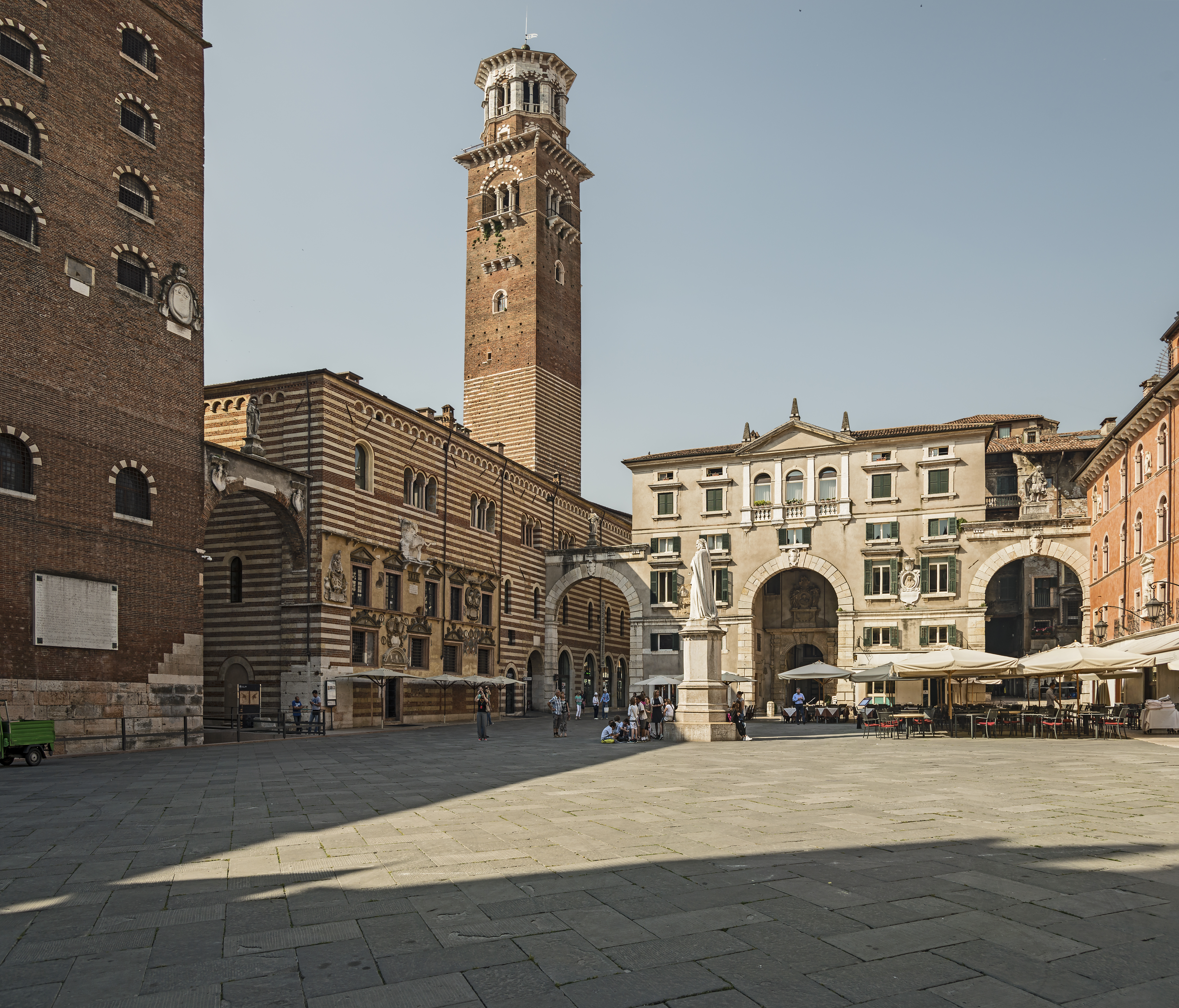
Piazza dei Signori

Piazza dei Signori is an elegant medieval square with various buildings and towers. It has a monument dedicated to Dante Alighieri.

The Basilica of San Lorenzo is another Romanesque church, albeit smaller. It dates from around 1177, but was built on the site of a Paleochristian church, fragments of which remain. The church is built of alternating tracks of brick and stone, and has two cylindrical towers, housing spiral staircases to the women's galleries. The interior is sober but still quiet. The striped bands of stone and brick and the graceful arches complement the setting.

Santa Maria Antica is a small Romanesque church that served as the private chapel of the Scaligeri clan, and is famous for the Gothic Scaliger Tombs.

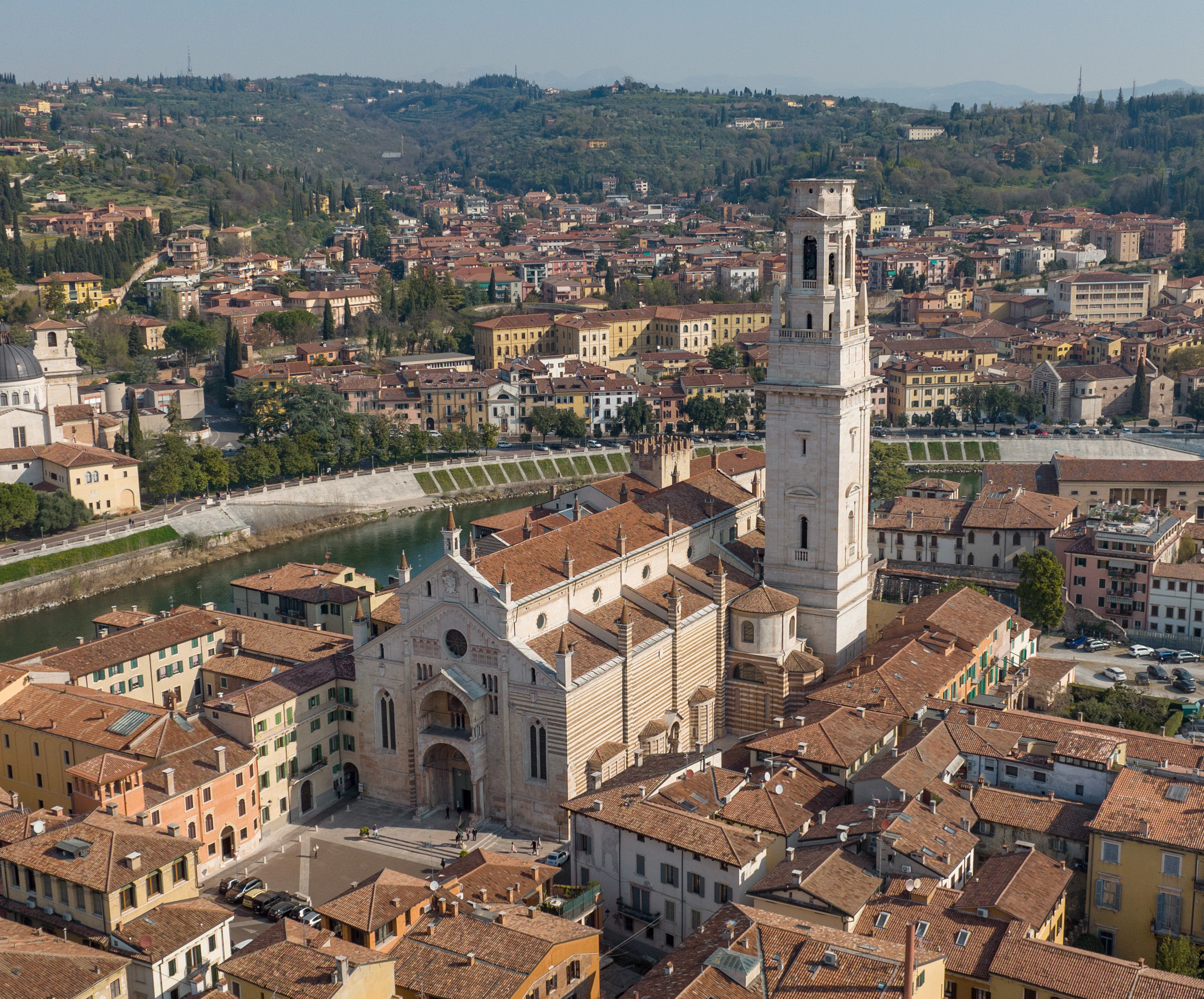
The Verona Cathedral

The Verona Cathedral, also known as the Duomo, is a notable Romanesque church.

Sant'Anastasia is a huge and lofty church built from 1290 to 1481 by the Dominicans to hold the massive congregations attracted by their sermons. The Pellegrini chapel houses the fresco St. George and the Princess of Trebizond by Pisanello as well as the grave of Wilhelm von Bibra. An art festival is held in the square each May.

The Castelvecchio Bridge, also known as Ponte Scaligero, is a segmental arch bridge. At the time of its completion in 1356, it was the world's largest bridge arch. It has a span length of 48.70 m (159.78 ft).

== Economy ==
Verona has a diversified economy spanning services, agri-food, automotive, fashion, and industry. Some of the companies based in the city are major players in their respective industries, including:

AGSM AIM Energia, Air Dolomiti, Banco BPM, Bauli, Calzedonia, doValue, Eurospin, Fedrigoni, Franklin & Marshall (company), Pastificio Rana, Revo, Technital, Veronesi Group, Vicenzi Group and Zuegg.

Examples of Veronese digital economy startups that became mature, well-established companies include RORTOS, a software developer centered on flight simulation products for mobile.

== Transport ==
=== Public transit ===
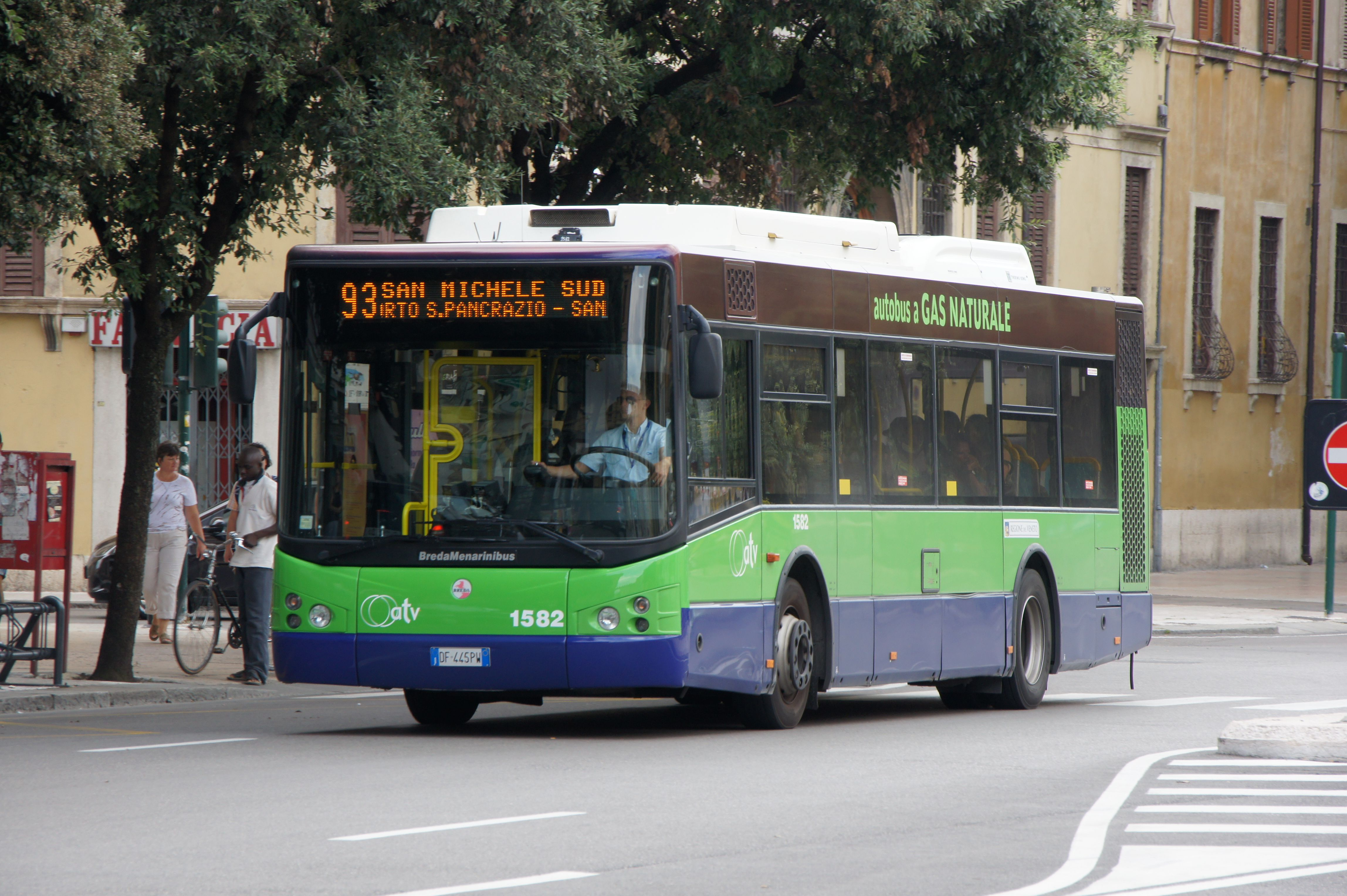
An ATV bus in Verona

Public transit has been operated by the provincial public transport company, Azienda Trasporti Verona (ATV), since 2007. From 1884 to 1951, the city was served by the Verona tram network. Trolleybuses replaced the trams which were themselves replaced by buses in 1975. A new trolleybus network is currently under construction by ATV and is expected to open in 2026.

An incline lift, the Verona funicular, opened in 2017 and provides access from the Ponte Pietra to the Roman theatre museum and San Pietro Castle.

=== Railways ===
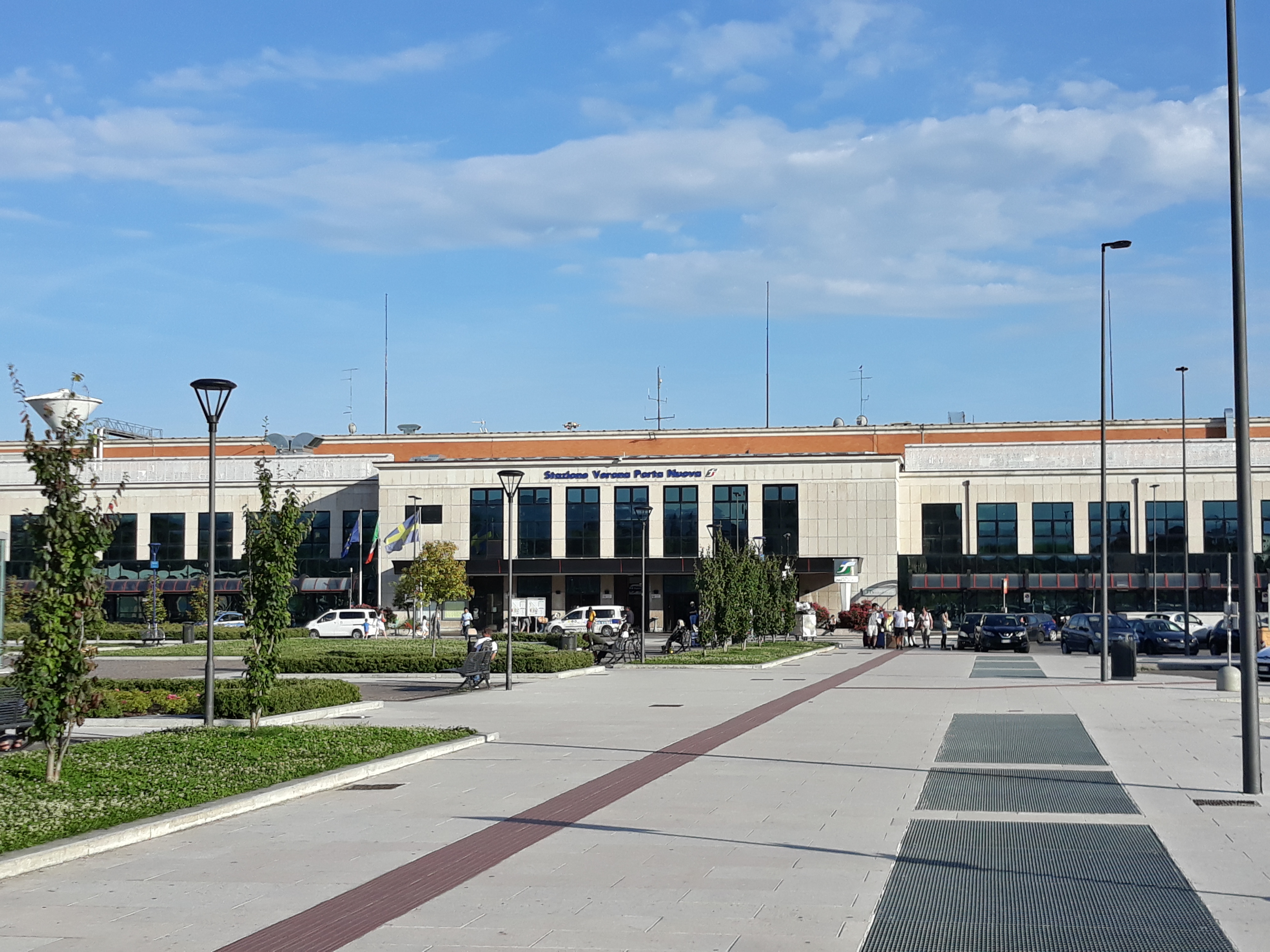
Verona Porta Nuova railway station

Verona lies at a major route crossing where the north–south rail line from the Brenner Pass to Rome intersects with the east–west line between Milan and Venice, giving the city rail access to most of Europe. In addition to regional and local services, the city is served by direct international trains to Zurich, Innsbruck, and Munich. ÖBB nightjet provides overnight sleeper service via Verona on its La Spezia to Wien and München lines.

Verona's main station is Verona Porta Nuova railway station, to the south of the city center. It is considered to be the ninth busiest railway station in Italy, handling approximately 68,000 passengers per day, or 25 million passengers per year.

There is a lesser station to the east of the city at Porta Vescovo, which used to be the main station in Verona, but now only receives trains between Venice and Porta Nuova.

=== Airport ===
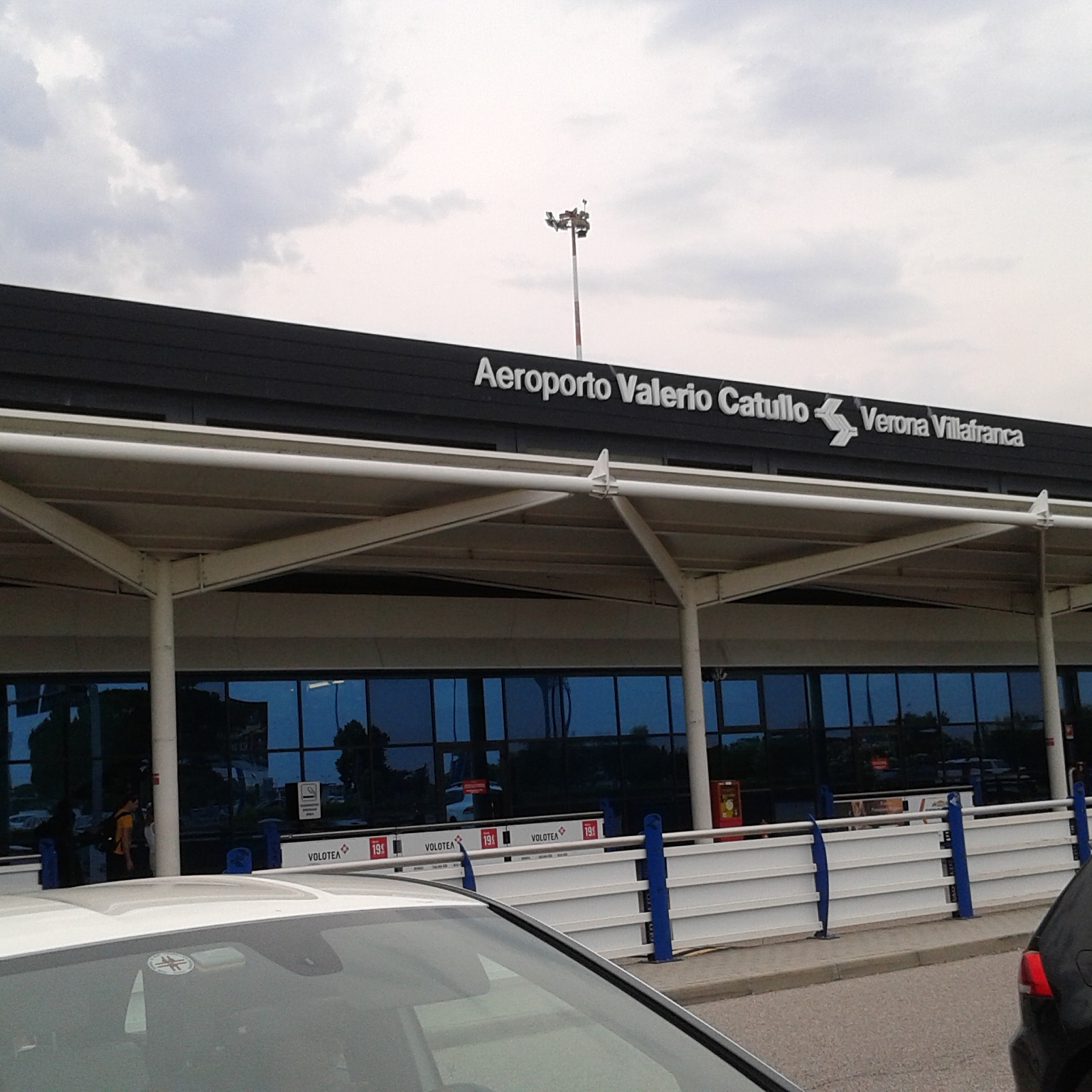
Verona airport

Verona Airport is located 10 km (6.2 mi) southwest of Verona. In 2024, passenger traffic amounted to more than 3.7 million people. It is linked to Porta Nuova railway station by a frequent bus service.

There are direct flights between Verona and Rome Fiumicino, Munich, Berlin, Moscow, Naples, Frankfurt, Catania, London Gatwick, Dublin, Palermo, Cork, Manchester, Liverpool and Cagliari among others.

== Sport ==
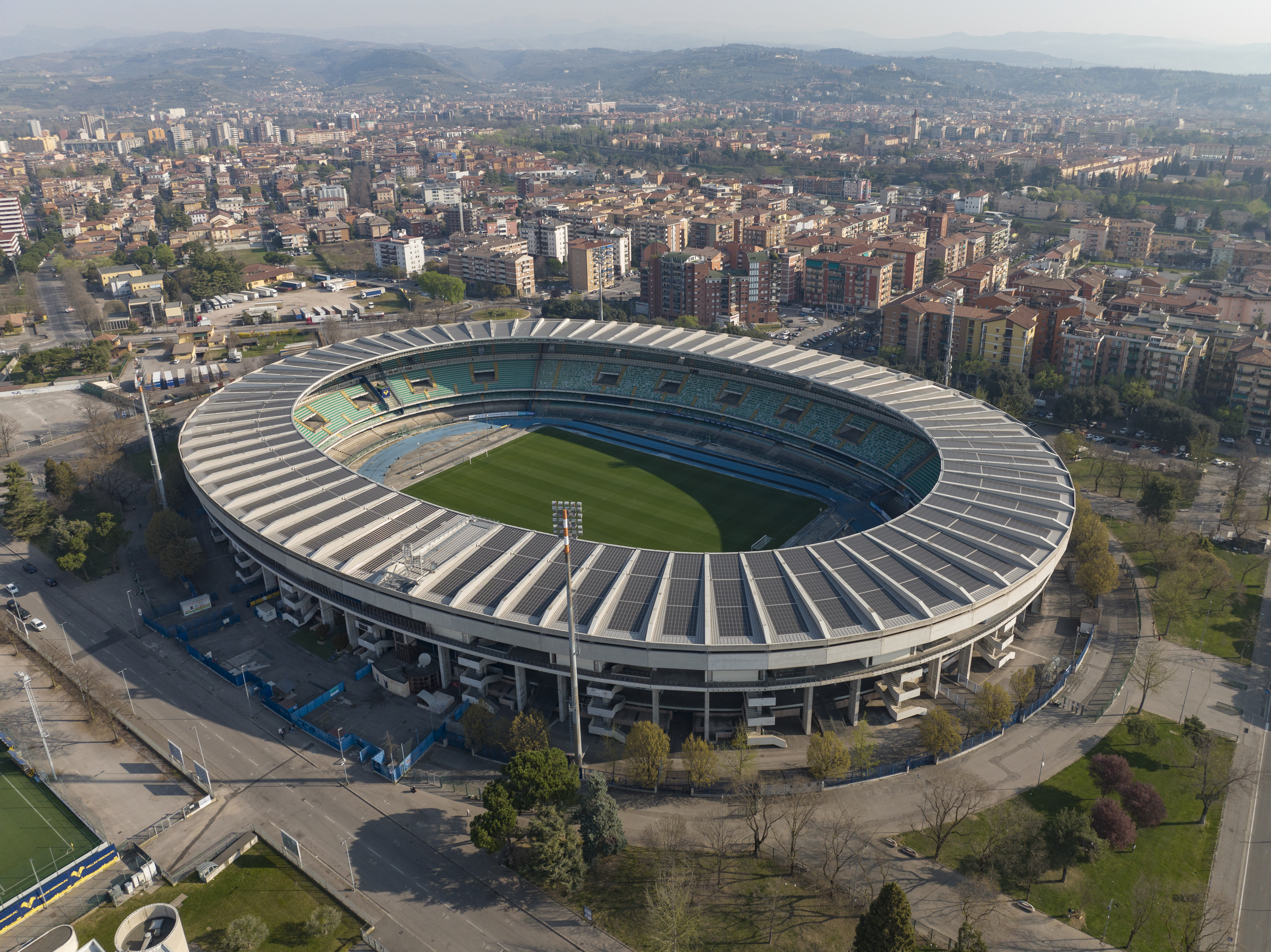
Stadio Marcantonio Bentegodi, which was used as a venue at the 1990 FIFA World Cup, is home to Verona's major football club, Hellas Verona.

The city has two professional football teams. Historically, the city's major team has been Hellas Verona. They won the Italian Serie A championship in 1984–85 and played in the European Cup the following year. Chievo Verona represented Chievo, a suburb of Verona, and was created in 1929. They ceased to exist in 2021 due to outstanding tax payments.

As of the 2026–27 season, Hellas plays in the second division of Italian football, Serie B, while Virtus Verona, the other club in the city, plays in the Serie C. The teams of Hellas and Chievo contested the Derby della Scala and shared the 38,402-seater Stadio Marcantonio Bentegodi (now only home to Hellas due to the folding of Chievo), which was used as a venue at the 1990 FIFA World Cup.

Verona is home to the volleyball team Verona Volley (now in Serie A1), the rugby team Franklin and Marshall Cus Verona Rugby (now in Serie A1), and the basketball team Scaligera Basket (now in Legadue).

The city has twice hosted the UCI Road World Championships, in 1999 (with Treviso as co-host) and in 2004. The city also regularly hosts stages of the Giro d'Italia annual cycling race. Verona also hosted the baseball world cup in 2009, and the Volleyball World Cup in September–October 2010. Verona is hosting the Volleyball Women's World Championship in September–October 2014.

The city hosted the 2026 Winter Olympics closing ceremonies and the 2026 Winter Paralympics opening ceremonies at Arena di Verona.

== In popular culture ==
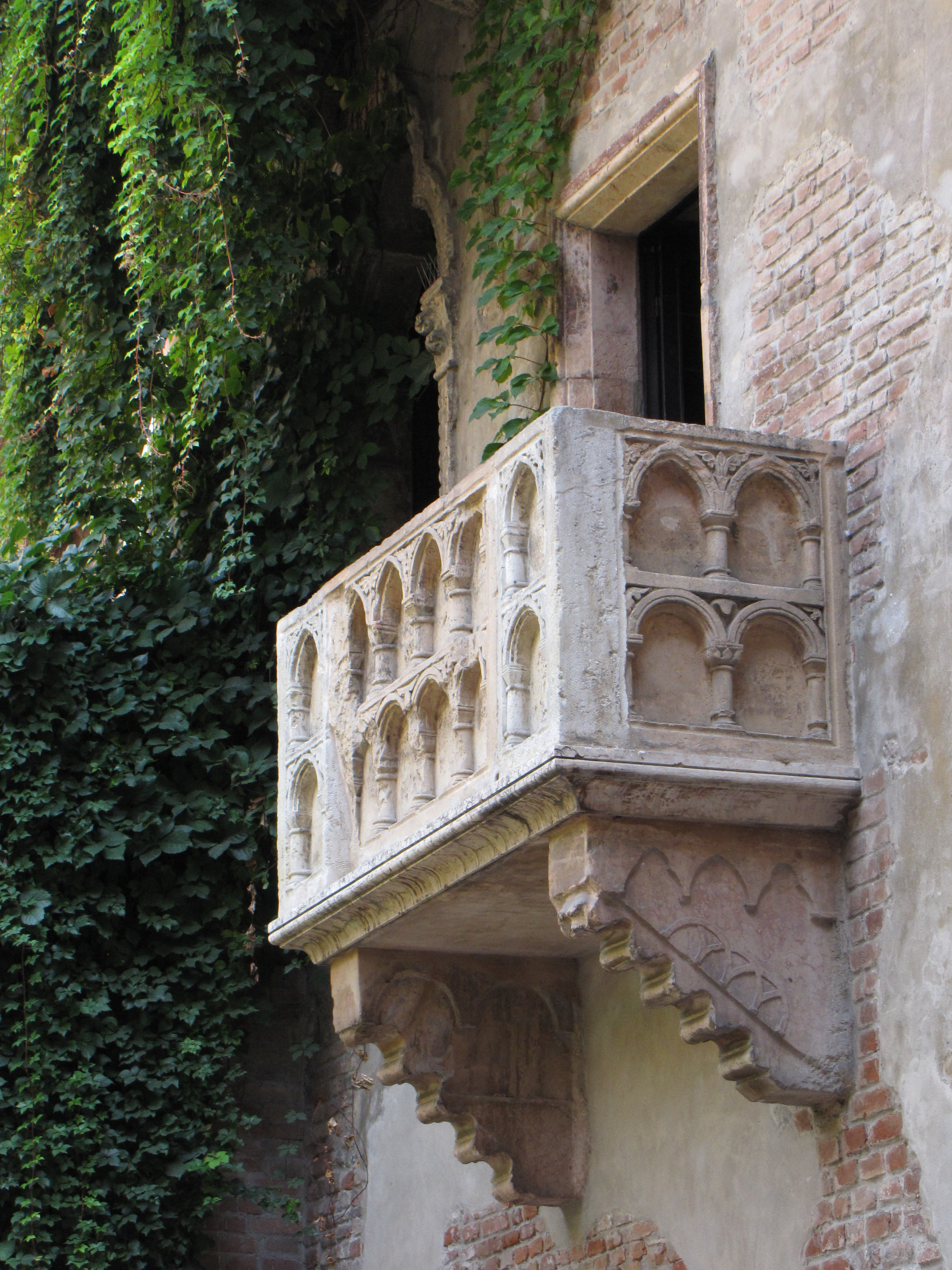
The balcony of Juliet's house

Theodoric the Great was portrayed as a king from Verona in the Germanic legend cycle of Dietrich von Bern. Three of William Shakespeare's plays (Romeo and Juliet, The Taming of the Shrew and The Two Gentlemen of Verona) are set in Verona. It is unknown whether Shakespeare ever visited the city. Some areas around the city are named in reference to the play, like the House of Juliet, the Grave of Juliet, the House of Romeo and the Tomb of Romeo. In May 2024, Pope Francis regarded Verona as the city of love.

== International relations ==
=== Twin towns – sister cities ===
Verona is twinned with:

- Albany, United States
- Johannesburg, South Africa
- Munich, Germany
- Nagahama, Japan
- Nîmes, France
- Pula, Croatia
- Saint-Josse-ten-Noode, Belgium
- Salzburg, Austria

=== Friendship pacts ===
Verona has friendly relations with:

- Ayacucho, Peru
- Bethlehem, Palestine
- Corfu, Greece
- Detmold, Germany
- Fresno, United States
- Hangzhou, China
- Kazan, Russia
- Korçë, Albania
- Košice, Slovakia
- Kragujevac, Serbia
- Namwon, South Korea
- Ningbo, China
- Prilep, North Macedonia
- Ra'anana, Israel
- Tirana, Albania
- Zhuji, China
- Zintan, Libya

== Notable people ==
- Aleardo Aleardi (1812–1878), poet
- Berto Barbarani (1872–1945), poet
- Paolo Bellasio (1554–1594), composer of the Renaissance; member of the Roman School
- Stefano Bernardi (1580–1637), baroque composer
- Massimo Bubola (born 1954), singer-songwriter born in Terrazzo
- Paolo Caliari (1528–1588), well known as "Veronese", painter
- Lou Campi (1905–1989), professional bowler
- Mario Capecchi (born 1937), Nobel prize in Medicine, 2007
- Giovanni Francesco Caroto (c. 1480–1555), painter
- Catullus (c. 84-c. 54 BCE), Latin poet
- Walter Chiari (1924-1991), actor
- Gigliola Cinquetti (born 1947), singer who brought Italy its first Eurovision Song Contest win in 1964
- Lorenzo Comendich, painter
- Damiano Cunego, former world number 1 cyclist and former Giro d'Italia winner
- Giorgio de Stefani (1904–1992), tennis player, finalist at the 1932 French Open
- Alfredo de Palchi (1926–2020), poet and translator
- Franco Donatoni (1927–2000), composer
- Gino Fano, mathematician
- Girolamo Fracastoro (1476/8—1553), also known as Fracastorius, renowned scholar, physician, and poet
- Giovanni Giocondo (1433–1515), architect and scholar
- Girolamo dai Libri (1474–1555), illuminator of manuscripts and painter
- Romano Guardini (1885–1968), theologian
- Claudio Guglielmoni (born 1940), retired professional football player
- Marc'Antonio Ingegneri, composer, teacher of Claudio Monteverdi
- Ernestine von Kirchsberg, Austrian landscape painter
- Girolamo Lancerotti, painter
- Cesare Lombroso (1835–1909), criminologist
- Scipione Maffei, writer and historian
- Matteo Manassero, British amateur golf champion, 2009
- Giovanni Battista Maderni (1758–1803), Italian-Swiss painter
- Arnoldo Mondadori (1889-1971), editor
- Romeo Montague and Juliet Capulet, fictional characters from Shakespeare's play Romeo and Juliet
- Marcantonio Negri, Baroque composer, associate of Monteverdi
- Isotta Nogarola (1418–1466), writer and humanist
- Carlo Pedrotti (1817–1893), 19th-century composer, conductor, voice teacher, and opera administrator
- St. Peter Martyr (1205–1252), Dominican preacher and saint
- Ippolito Pindemonte (1753–1828), poet
- Ratherius (887–890 AD – 974 AD), Medieval bishop and writer
- Francesca Rettondini (born 1968), actress
- Carlo Rovelli (born 1956), physicist and writer
- Vincenzo Ruffo (c. 1508–1587), composer of the Renaissance
- Emilio Salgari (1862–1911), novelist
- Antonio Salieri (1750–1825), composer
- Michele Sammicheli, architect
- Sara Simeoni, the former world high jump primatist and Olympic gold medalist
- Marco Stroppa (born 1959), composer
- Bartolomeo Tromboncino (c. 1470–1535 or later), composer of the Renaissance period
- Giorgio Zancanaro (born 1939), baritone
- Achille Lauro (born 1990), singer-songwriter and rapper
- Guarino da Verona (1374–1460), educator

== See also ==
- Idea Verona, an Italian language, art, and culture school for foreigners visiting or living in Verona
- Verona defensive system
- Roman walls of Verona
- Castelvecchio Museum
- Churches of Verona
- Raterian iconography
