= Idea Verona =

Centro Studui IDEA Verona
- Founded: 1998
- Website: www.ideaverona.com

IDEA Verona is an Italian language, art, and culture school for foreigners visiting or living in Verona. The school was founded in 1998 and is located at the Don Bosco Institute in the historical centre of Verona.

Language classes are offered at every level of Italian, from beginning to advanced. Other classes offered include art history, Italian cooking, fresco painting, and speciality courses for students studying in music and opera singing.

IDEA Verona is an accredited language school and collaborates with the study abroad programs of the University of Illinois, Urbana-Champaign (USA), British Columbia University (Canada), and Macquarie University(Australia). Within Verona, the school operates accordance with the Chamber of Commerce of Verona and the Dante Alighieri Society. The school is an authorised centre of PLIDA (Progetto Lingua Italiana Dante Alighieri) the recognised certificate in Italian language, according to Università La Sapienza - Roma.
