= Capuan Venus =

Venus de Milo

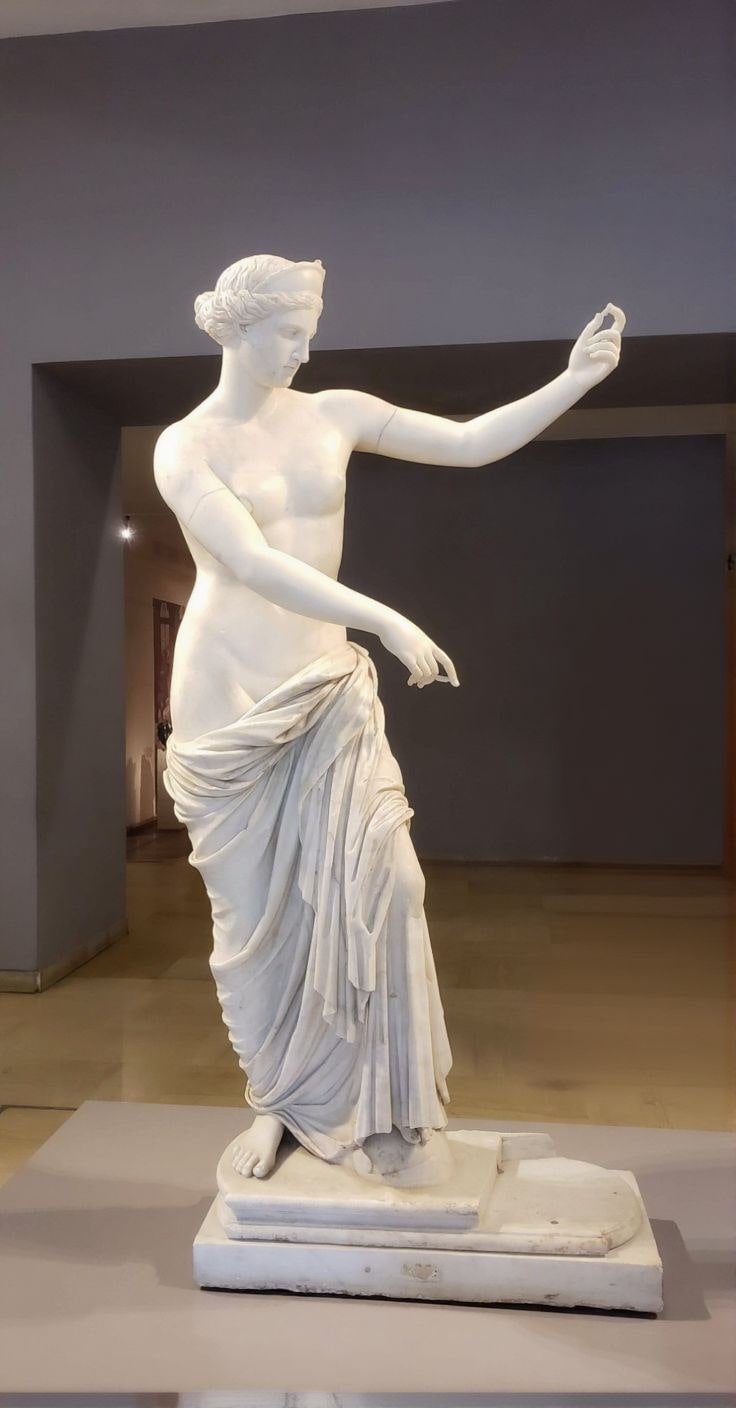
Venus of Capua as exhibited in the Museo Nacional de Bellas Artes in Buenos Aires, Argentina in early 2019.

The Venus of Capua is a sculpture made during the empire of Hadrian (117 to 138 AD).

Standing on her right leg, with her left foot resting on a helmet, the Greek goddess Aphrodite (Venus, according to Roman mythology) is represented half-naked. A himation or mantle of rich draping covers the lower part of the body, supported by the knee of the left leg slightly bent, and highlights the slight twist of the bust. The hair is divided on the forehead and gathered at the nape, which adorns a headband whose edge was possibly decorated with a string of pearls. On the face, oval in shape, there are almond-shaped eyes and well-drawn lips. The upper part of the body and the head of Aphrodite turn slightly to the left, while the arms rise to hold, almost certainly, the shield of the warrior god Ares, where the goddess looks at herself as if it were a mirror. In this figure, the harmonic composition of the contrapposto adapts to a female body.

== Artistic context ==
The myth represented has been the subject of various interpretations throughout history. It has been proposed that this figure is related to the Roman myth of the victory of Venus over Mars, an allegory of the triumph of love over war. This iconography is reflected in testimonies of the same period, both literary (the Argonautica, by Apollonius of Rhodes) and pictorial. There are numerous iconographic representations present in Pompeian paintings. This reading can also be linked to the worship of Venus Vincitrix in Capua in 59 AD, after Julius Caesar turned it into a veteran colony and chose her as the city's protective deity.

This version of Aphrodite was found in 1750 at the Amphitheatre of Capua in Capua, where it was part of the architectural decoration. In 1820, the drapery, arms and nose were restored. Made in marble, the piece is dated to the Hadrianic period and derives from a Greek original in bronze at the end of the 4th century BC.

It is permanently exhibited in the Napoli Archeological Museum in Italy.

It also was temporarily exhibited in the Museo Nacional de Bellas Artes in Buenos Aires from November 15th 2018 until February 17th 2019 as part of the cultural relations and exchanges between the Italian and Argentine States, took place in the context of the G-20 Summit hosted by Argentinian Government in Buenos Aires City,

== Bibliography ==
- C.M. Havelock, The Aphrodite of Knidos and Her Successors: A Historical Review of the Female Nude in Greek Art, University of Michigan Press, 2008.
