= Lorenzo Comendich =

Italian painter (1675–1720)

Lorenzo Comendich (1675–1720), also known as Lazzaro Comendich, was an Italian painter of the late-Baroque period.

A native of Verona, he studied under Francesco Monti, and settled at Milan, where he flourished in the first part of the 18th century. His works were held in high repute as a battle painter. The Baron Martine took him under his patronage about 1700, for whom he produced a variety of works, among them his Battle of Luzzara, which Louis XIV of France (the victor in that battle) is said to have beheld with singular pleasure, and commissioned the artist to paint a duplicate for himself.
