= Amphitheatre of ancient Capua =

Roman amphitheatre in Capua, Italy

Amphitheatre of Capua
- Anfiteatro campano (Italian)
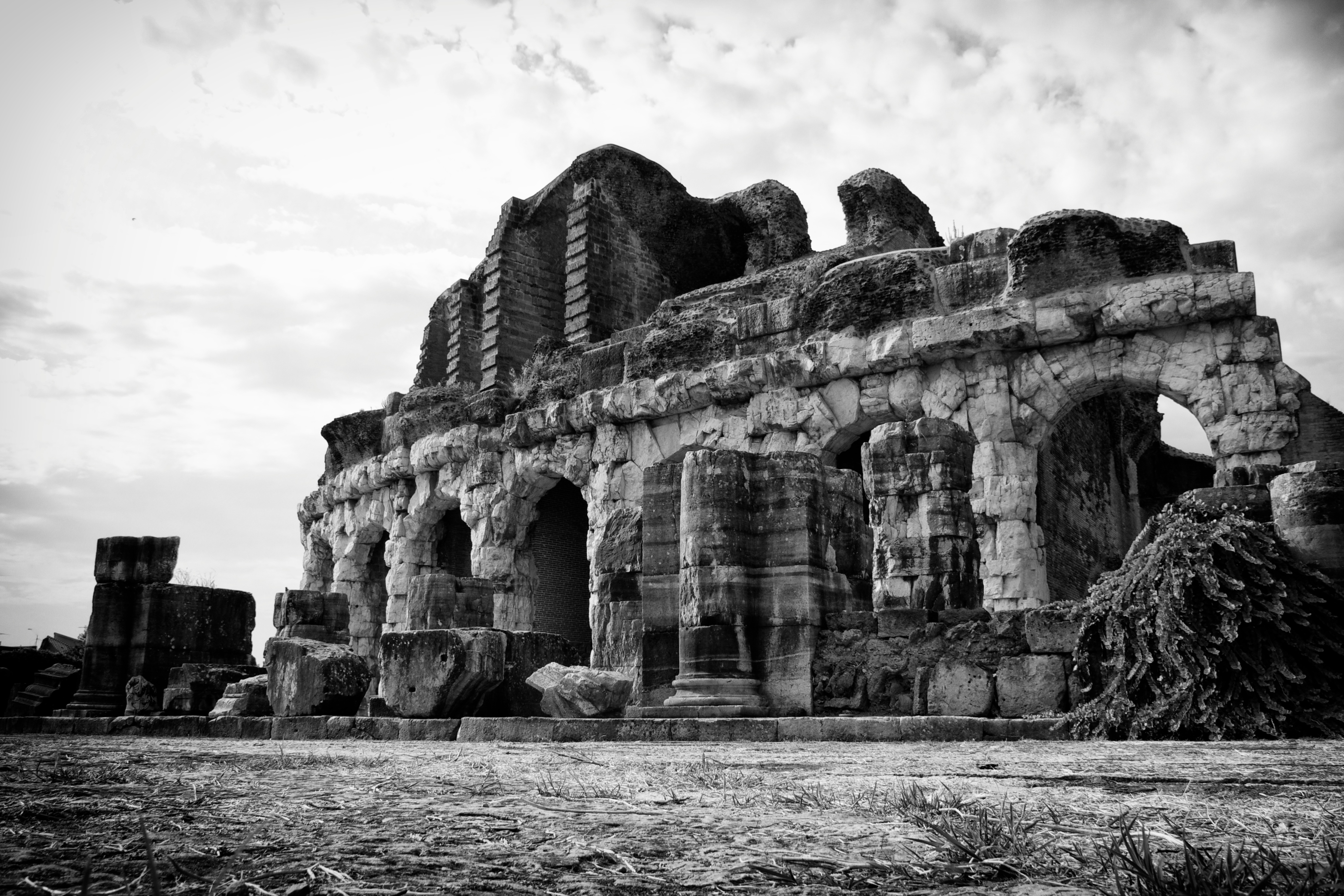
- Interactive map of Amphitheatre of Capua
- 41°05′10″N 14°15′0″E
- Type: Amphitheatre
- Cultures: Roman
- Location: Santa Maria Capua Vetere, Italy

History
- Built: c.100 AD

Site notes
- Excavation dates: 1726; 1811–1860; 1920–1930
- Archaeologists: Alessio Simmaco Mazzocchi
- Management: Polo museale della Campania
- Public access: Partial
- Website: www.polomusealecampania.beniculturali.it/index.php/l-anfiteatro

The Amphitheatre of Capua was a Roman amphitheatre in the ancient city of Capua (modern Santa Maria Capua Vetere), second only to the Colosseum in size and probably the model for it. It may have been the first amphitheatre to be built by the Romans. and was the location of the first and most famous gladiator school.

Today, its remains are found in the comune of Santa Maria Capua Vetere, on Piazza I Ottobre. Much of the stone from the amphitheatre was reused by the Capuans in the Norman period to build the Castello delle Pietre. Some of the ornamental busts that were originally used as keystones for the arches of the amphitheatre are found today in the façade of the Palazzo del comune of Capua. Since December 2014, the museum, amphitheatre, and mithraeum have been under the control of the state museum of Campania. In 2024 the amphitheatre, along with ancient Capua as part of the Appian Way, has been recognised as a UNESCO World Heritage Site.

== Structure ==
Like all amphitheatres, the building had an elliptical plan. Its dimensions approach those of the Colosseum in Rome, with which it shares so many structural features that the Capuan amphitheatre is believed to have provided the direct model for the Colosseum.

The major axis of the structure is 170 metres (560 ft) and the minor axis is 139 metres (456 ft). The façade had a total height of 46 metres (151 ft), divided into four levels, all of the Tuscan order. The lower three levels consisted of 80 arches, each made of travertine and decorated with a bust of a god in the keystone. Seven of these busts have been incorporated into the Palazzo Municipale of Capua, where they remain visible. Others are displayed in the city's museum.

Some remains are visible in the Museo Campano in Capua and in the Museo archeologico dell'antica Capua in Santa Maria Capua Vetere. More remains can be seen in the National Archaeological Museum in Naples, such as the Venus of Capua, which was discovered in the general area of the amphitheatre.

== History ==
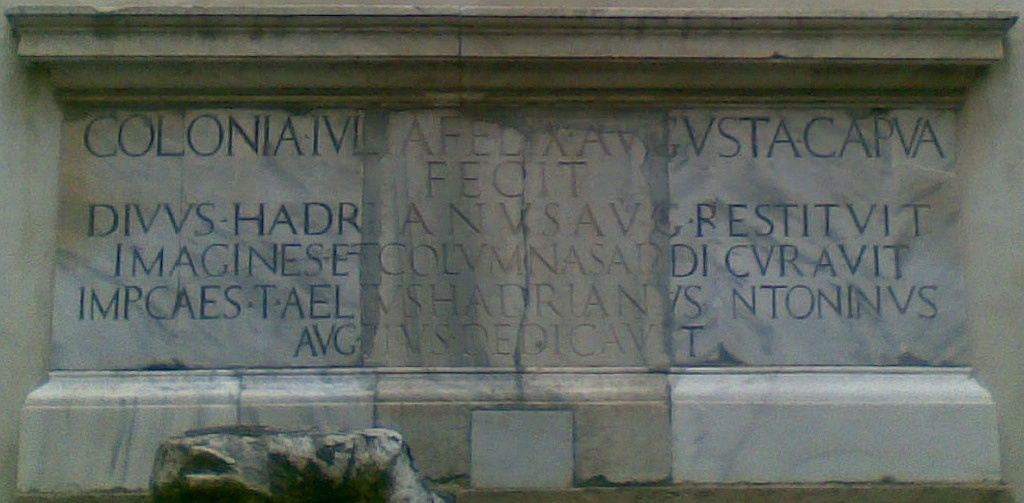
Epigrah saying Colonia Iulia Felix.

During the excavations of September 1726, a damaged inscription was found in front of the southern gate. It was restored by archaeologist Alessio Simmaco Mazzocchi, as follows:

COLONIA IULIA FELIX AUGUSTA CAPUA FECIT DIVUS HADRIANUS AUG RESTITUIT IMAGINES ET COLUMNAS ADDI CURAVIT IMP CAES T AELIUS HADRIANUS ANTONINUS AUG PIUS DEDICAVIT

— The Colonia Julia Felix Augusta Capua built this. The Divine Hadrian Augustus restored it. He took care of adding busts and columns. Emperor Caesar Titus Aelius Hadrianus Antoninus Augustus Pius dedicated it

The inscription, originally placed at the entrance to the amphitheatre, was put on display under the arch of the church of St Eligio a Capua, but is now conserved in the Museo Campano in Capua.

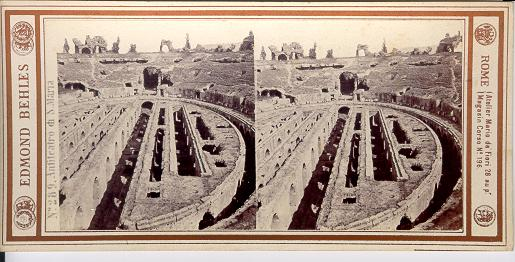
The arena of the amphitheatre at the beginning of the 20th century, stereograph.

As a result, reconstructing the history of the amphitheatre was possible. It was constructed by the colony after its establishment by Augustus following the Battle of Actium in 31 BC, and was restored by Hadrian in 119 AD, who added statues and columns. Emperor Antoninus Pius inaugurated it in AD 155.

Not all historians agree on the date of the amphitheatre's construction in the first century BC, which would make it the oldest of all known amphitheatres. Many claim that the current structure was built around AD 100 on the ruins of an earlier amphitheatre. If this hypothesis is correct, then the earliest known amphitheatre would instead be the Amphitheatre of Pompeii, built in 70 BC.

=== Middle Ages ===
After the fall of the Western Roman Empire, the amphitheatre was damaged by the Vandals under Genseric. Along with the rest of the city, it was further damaged by the Saracens in 841, during the war of succession for the Duchy of Benevento. The structure was used as a fortress by the Lombard princes of Capua.

From the end of the 9th century, it was largely spoliated by the Capuans themselves following the transfer of the Civitas Capuana from its old Roman site to Casilinum (the current location of the town), especially for the construction of the Lombard castle. It was also used as a quarry of marble and other materials for the construction of the Capua Cathedral, the campanile, and several palaces in Capua. Later, it was also spoliated for the construction of the Church of the Annunciation, but the story that the amphitheatre was spoliated for the construction of the Royal Palace of Caserta is false. The spoliation was very thorough. Large blocks were broken up to get at the bronze and lead that held them together, and the smaller stones were used for paving the streets. Only in the Bourbon period was the destruction of the amphitheatre halted, when the king declared it a national monument.

== Gallery ==
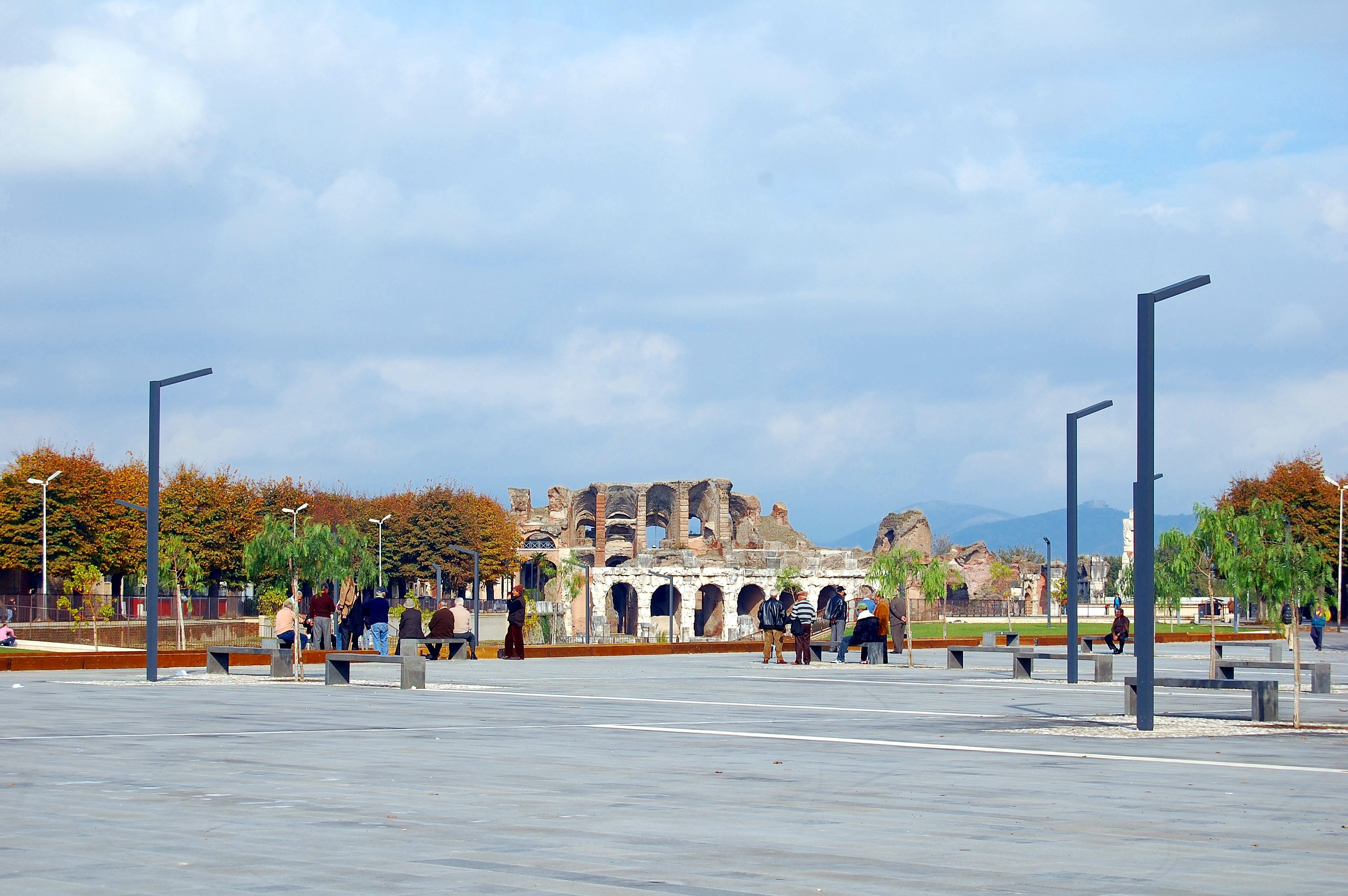

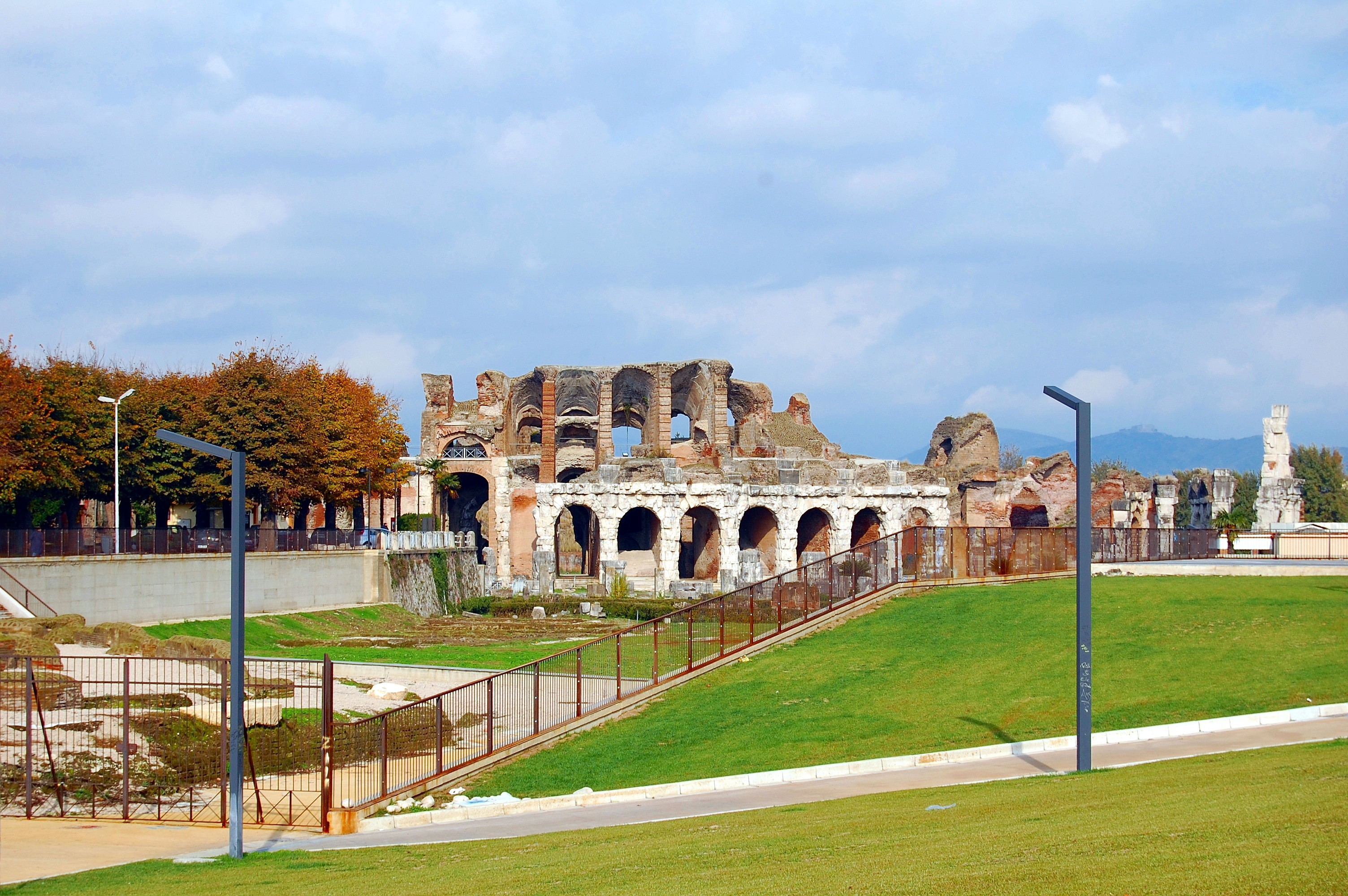

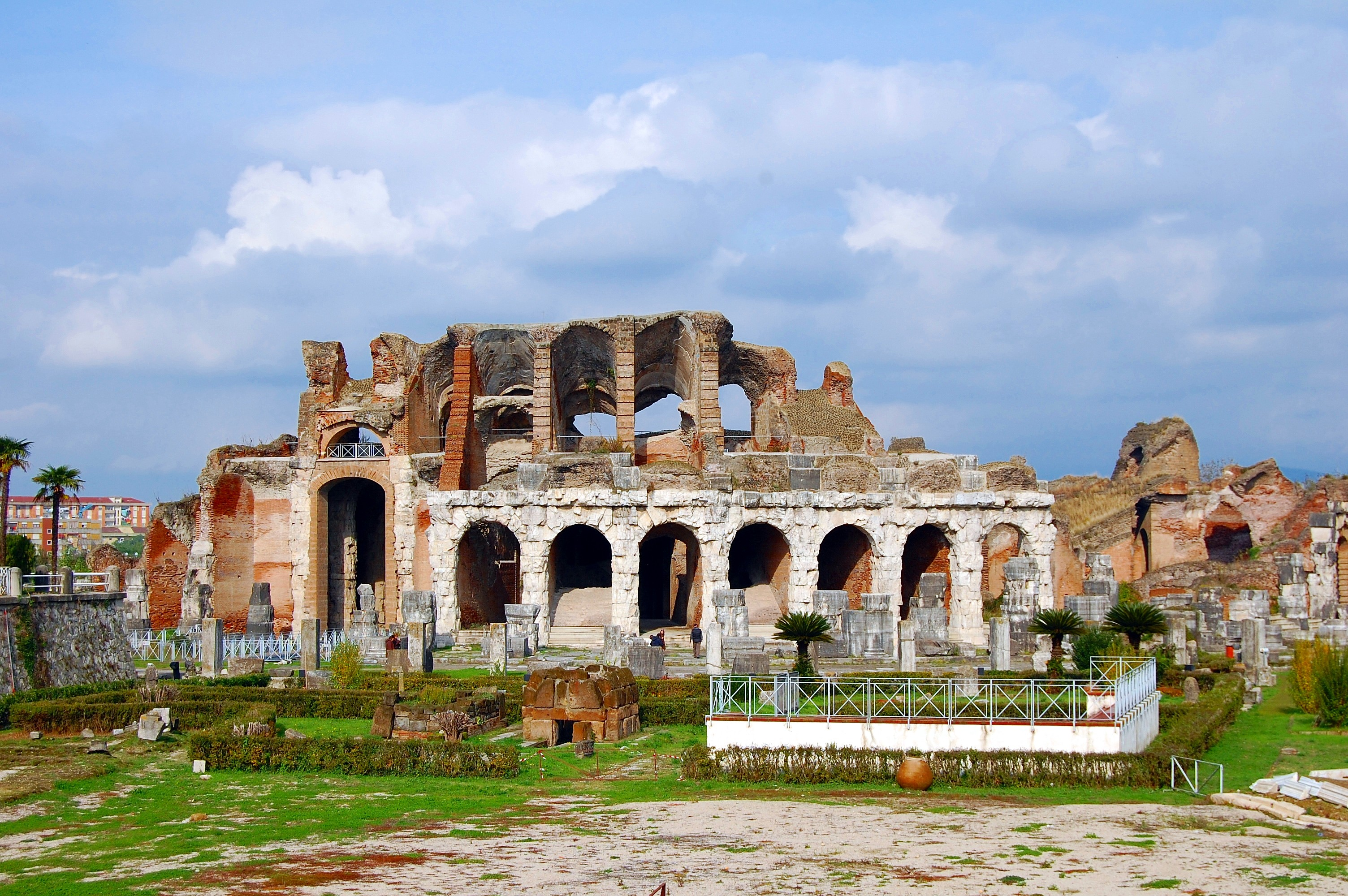

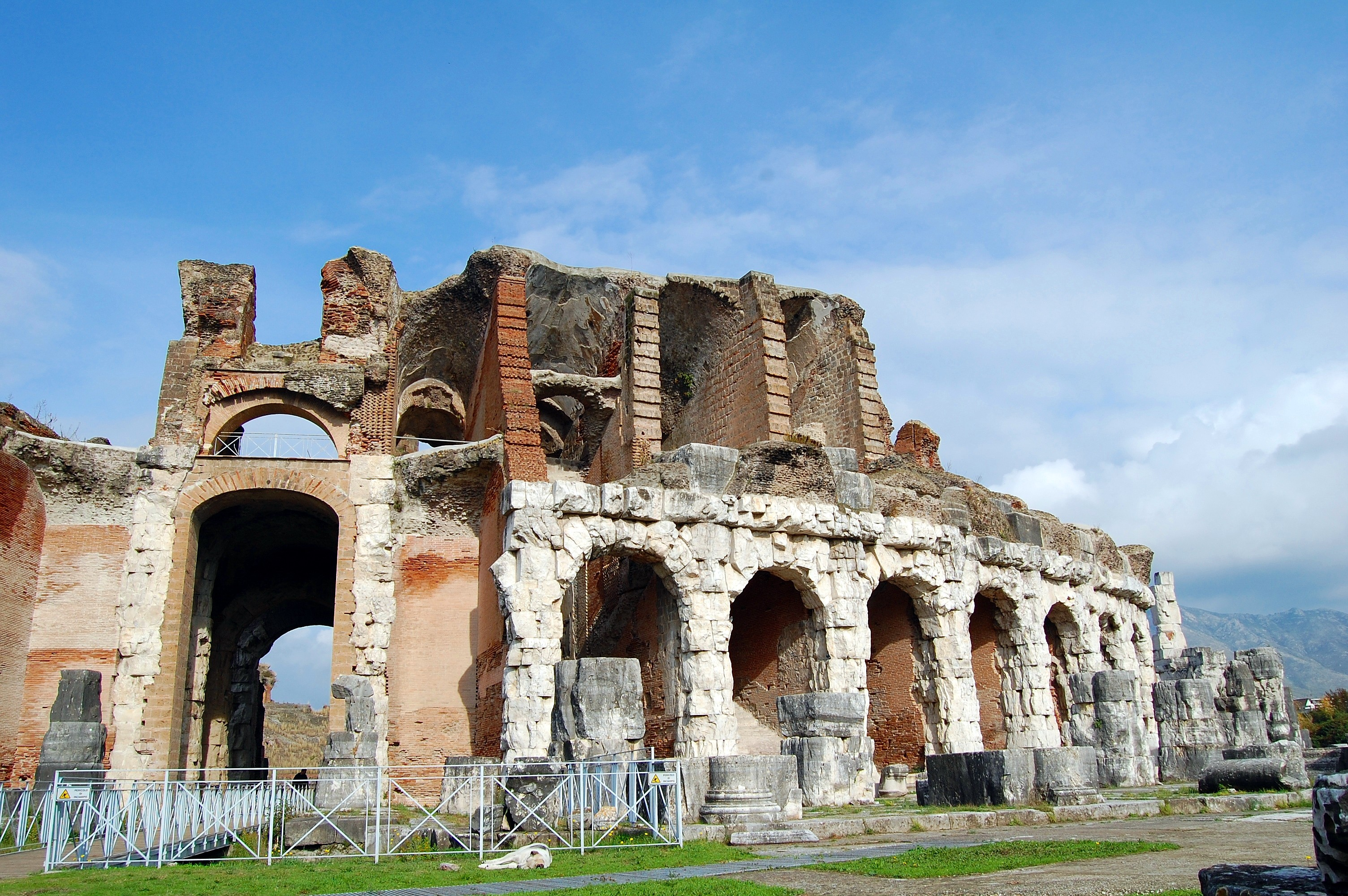

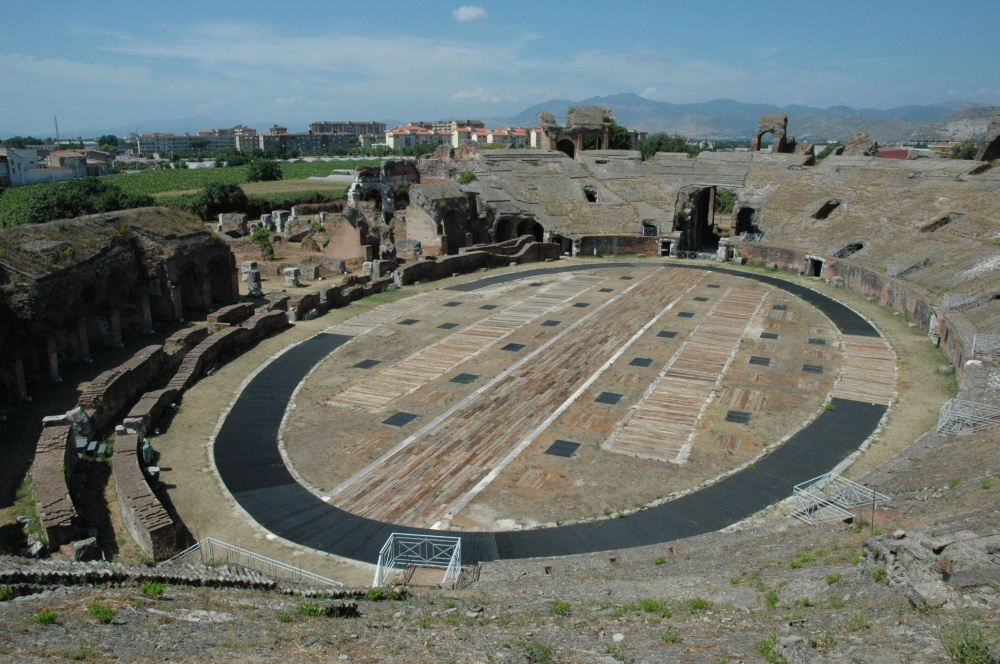

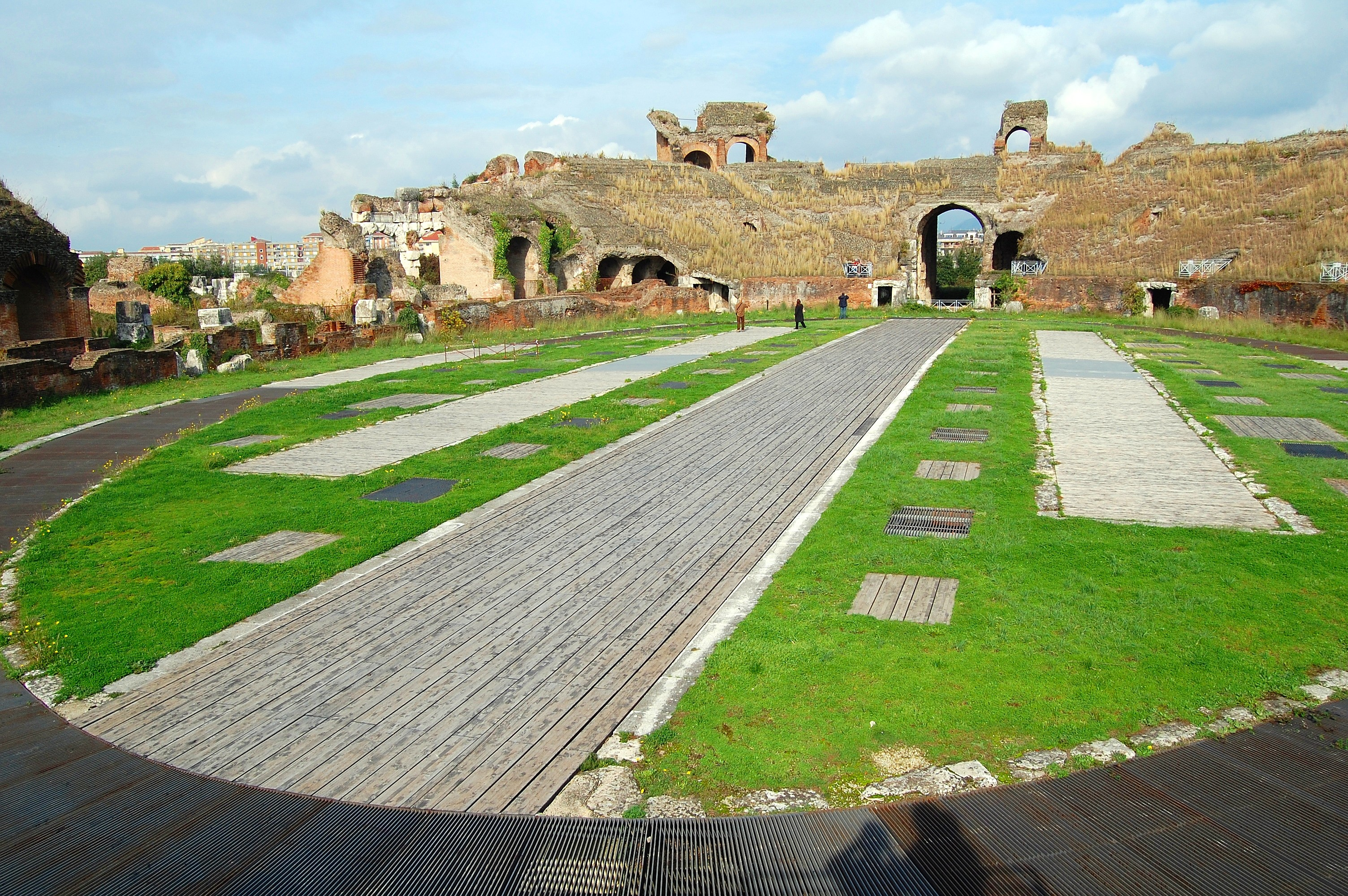

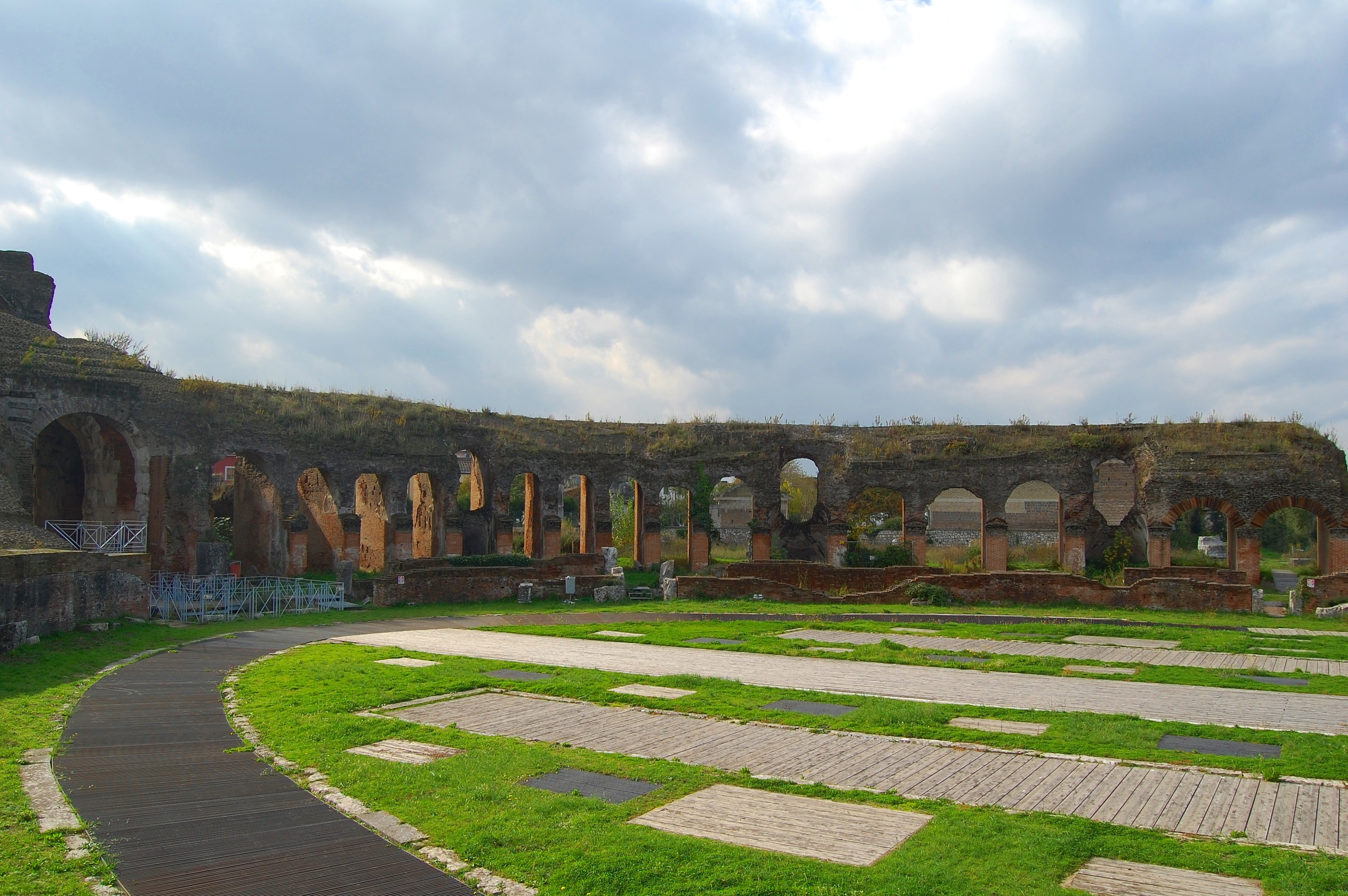

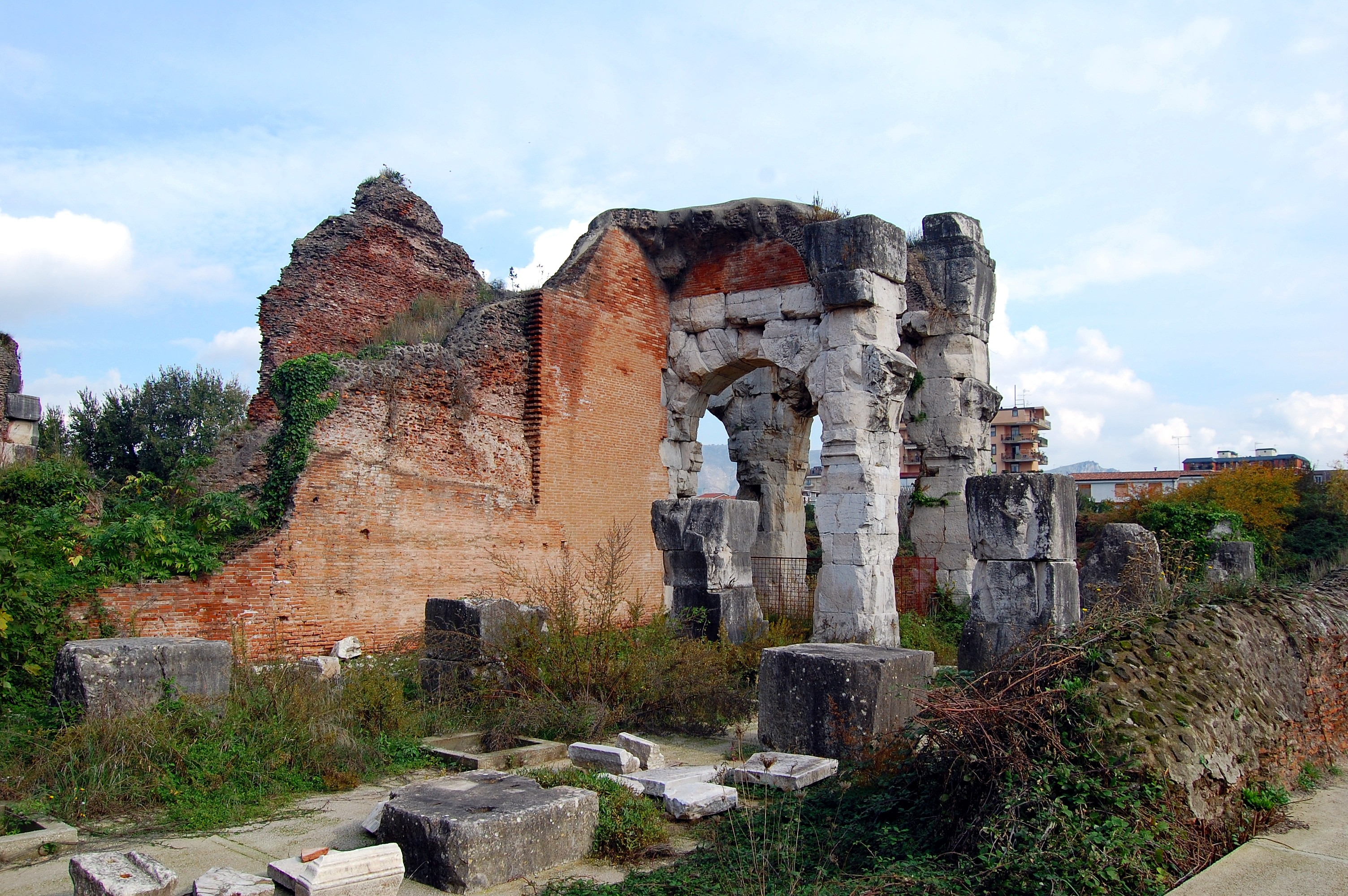

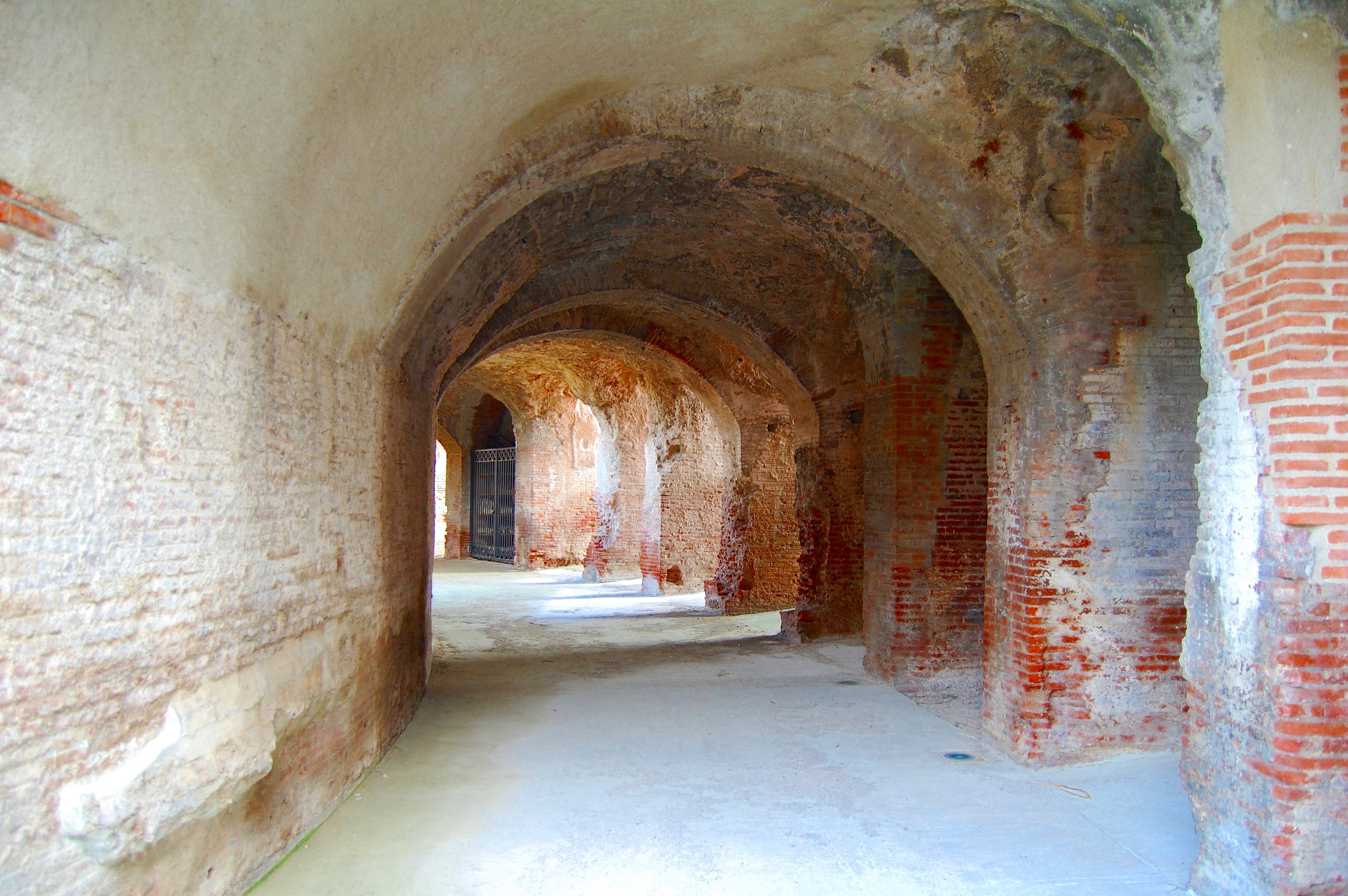

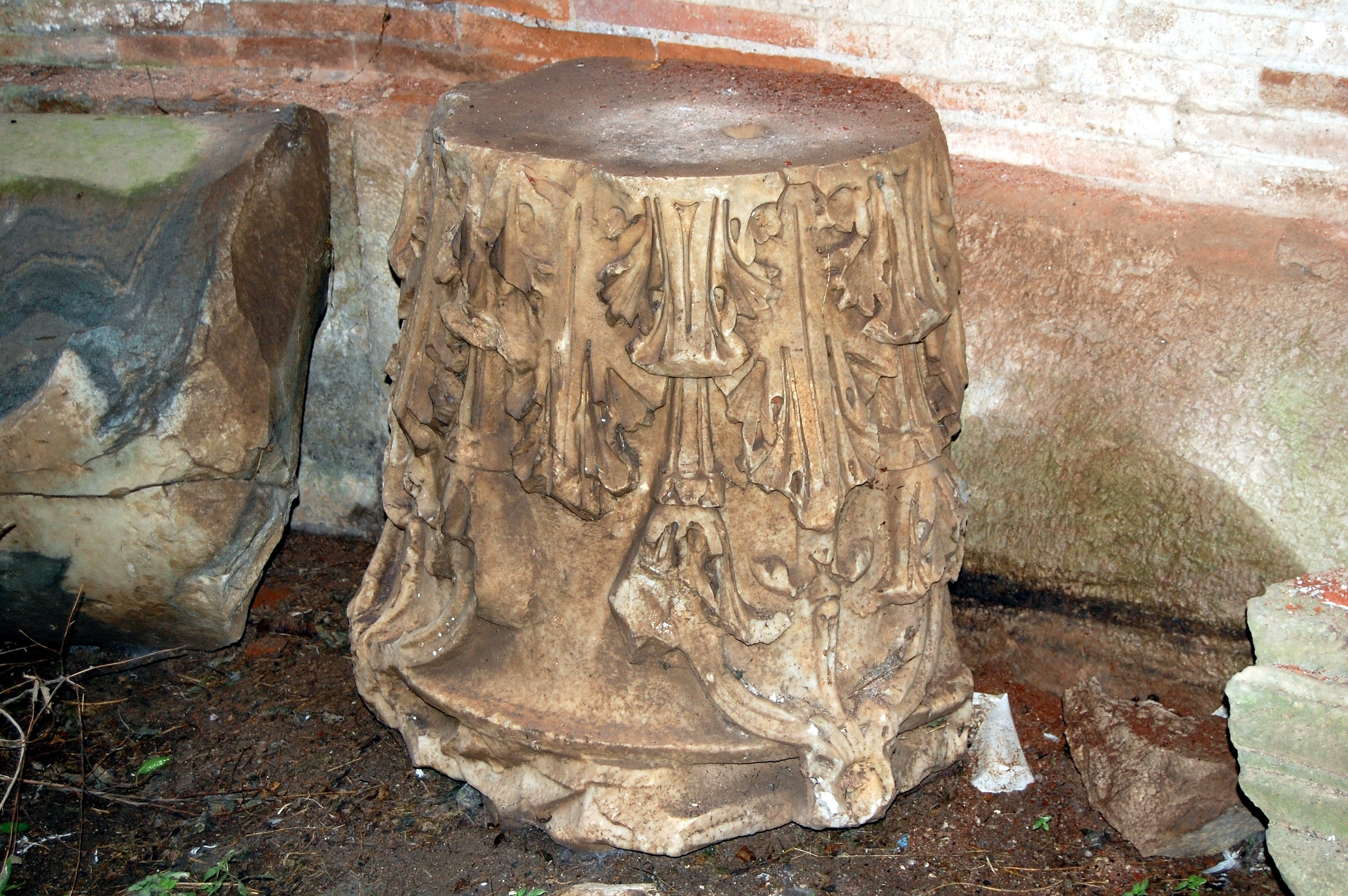

== See also ==
- List of Roman amphitheatres
- Spartacus
- Capuan Venus
- Museo dei gladiatori

== Sources ==
- Antonio Friello, "Aspetti della tutela e del restauro in età borbonica : l'anfiteatro campano," in Rendiconti dell'Accademia di Archeologia Lettere e Belle Arti, v. 75 (2008–2011), Napoli, 2012.
- Alberto Perconte Licatese, L' Anfiteatro campano e gli spettacoli dell'arena, 1ª edizione Santa Maria Capua Vetere: Curti - Stampa Sud, 1993; riedito Ed. Spartaco, 2002.
- Luigi Spina, Gianfranco Arciero, Valeria Sampaolo, L'anfiteatro campano di Capua, Napoli: Electa, 1997.
- Armando Trimarchi, "L' anfiteatro campano: storia, restauro e struttura architettonica," in Capys, annuario degli Amici di Capua, Vol. 15, p. 74-81, 1982.
- Vincenzo Trombetta, Una pagina di storia dell'anfiteatro campano: documenti d'archivio, Capua: Tip. Boccia, 1986.
- Gennaro Pesce, I rilievi dell'anfiteatro Campano, 19. 47 S., XXX S. Abb. 4°, Roma: Governatorato di Roma, 1941.
- Ernesto Papa, L'Anfiteatro Campano in S.a Maria Capua Vetere, Firenze: Tipografia domenicana, 1912.
- Mario Pagano, Un rilievo con scena di costruzione dell'Anfiteatro campano, Arte tipografica, 1988.
- Mariano de Laurentiis, Descrizione dello stato antico e moderno dell'anfiteatro campano, Napoli: A. Coda, 1835.
- Francesco Alvino (a cura di), Anfiteatro campano, restaurato ed illustrato dall'architetto Francesco Alvino, Napoli: Stamperia e cartiera del Fibreno, 1833
- Francesco Alvino, Anfiteatro Campano, Stabilimento Tipografico di Partenope, 1842.
