= Capitolium (Verona) =

- Interactive map of Capitolium
- 45°26′35″N 10°59′50″E
- Type: Temple
- Cultures: Roman
- Location: Italy, Verona

History
- Built: 1st century BC

Site notes
- Excavation dates: Beginning of the 1990s
- Archaeologists: Giuliana Cavalieri Manasse
- Discovered: End of the 1980s
- Owner: City of Verona
- Management: Superintendence of archaeology, fine arts and landscape for the provinces of Verona, Rovigo and Vicenza
- Public access: Only the Cryptoporticus

The Capitolium of Verona was a building complex forming part of the Forum area of the Roman city, it corresponds to today's Piazza delle Erbe. Parts of the cryptoporticus can be seen and visited under the loggia of Corte Sgarzerie, inside the crypt of the church of San Benedetto al Monte and under Palazzo Maffei.

== History ==
The building complex was built in the second half of the 1st century BC and was completed in 20 BC to celebrate the raising of the city's status to that of Roman municipium. The style of the temple building, intentionally archaic and inspired by the Roman Capitolium, underlines the political, rather than religious, value of the complex. A double portico that surrounded it on three sides, excluding the front one, was later erected by Marcus Magius, as shown by an inscription found at the same site. The commission of the temple is unknown: it is assumed that it may have been a group of senators strongly linked to Rome if not even Gaius Julius Caesar, whom, according to the sources, was certainly present in Verona at the time.

A sestertium of Domitian, dating back to the year 95 A.D., attests to a rebuilding of a portico wall: this coin was placed intentionally, either to remember the intervention, or with talismanic functions. Supporting the latter hypothesis is the fact that the coin depicts Jupiter: it may have been put there to evoke the protection of the deity to whom the complex was dedicated.

The cultural continuity is attested by a statue base bearing two later inscriptions: the first is the dedication of a statue to a woman of high rank, a priestess of the deified Plotina. The second inscription, dating from the end of the 2nd century AD or the beginning of the 3rd century AD, is located on the opposite side and is a dedication to Jupiter Optimus Maximus made by the Ordo Veronensium: the council of decuriones that administered the city. Another inscription, dating from about 379-380 A.D., mentions the moving of a bronze statue from the temple to the Forum, as it lay abandoned: this is an indication of the decline of the structures, probably as a result of the spread of the Christian religion and the weakening of the political structure.

At the end of the fourth century AD a fire destroyed all or part of the triporticus. A few decades later, around the fifth century AD, the entire structure was stripped bare, as it was in a state of abandonment and degradation. At the end of the seventh century AD the vaults that propped up the cryptoporticus collapsed. Other structures thus overlapped the ruins of the Roman buildings: an early medieval compartment, still visible in the archaeological area of Corte Sgarzerie; a tower house of which only the foundations remain; and finally the Mangano Loggia.

== Description ==
The imposing Capitolium complex, which stood on an artificial embankment of about 80 meters long, included the temple dedicated to the Capitoline Triad, which was accessed from the maximum decumanus and from the Forum through a staircase, and a portico that surrounded it on three sides, and that probably also functioned as city archive. Under the Capitolium there was a cryptoporticus, an element that currently constitutes the only visitable area of the archaeological complex, also accessible from the decumanus maximum via a staircase.

=== Date of manufacture ===
Although the monumental typology is similar to an architectural model used in Roman constructions from the end of the second century BC, it is believed to be of a later dating, in conjunction with the use of the opus incertum in the Po area. Thanks to the dating of a monumental epigraph found in the excavations of the western peribolos of the temple, we now know the name of the builder of the portico and the cryptoporticus:

M(arcus) Magius L(uci) f(ilius) cryptam fecit et porticus reposu[i]t d(e) p(ecunia) s(ua)

This epigraph was found in a structural element, similar to a frieze, it was made after the foundation structures of the temple area, and it is therefore contemporary with the structure of the Capitolium and offers a precise dating. In this important inscription, obtained from a block of limestone, a name that in Roman times was known not only in Verona, but also in the neighboring territories, is mentioned. The shape of the letters, the lack of a cognomen and other data have led paleographers to a probable dating of this dedicatory inscription, and therefore of the complex itself, to the first decade of the second half of the 1st century BC.

=== Temple ===
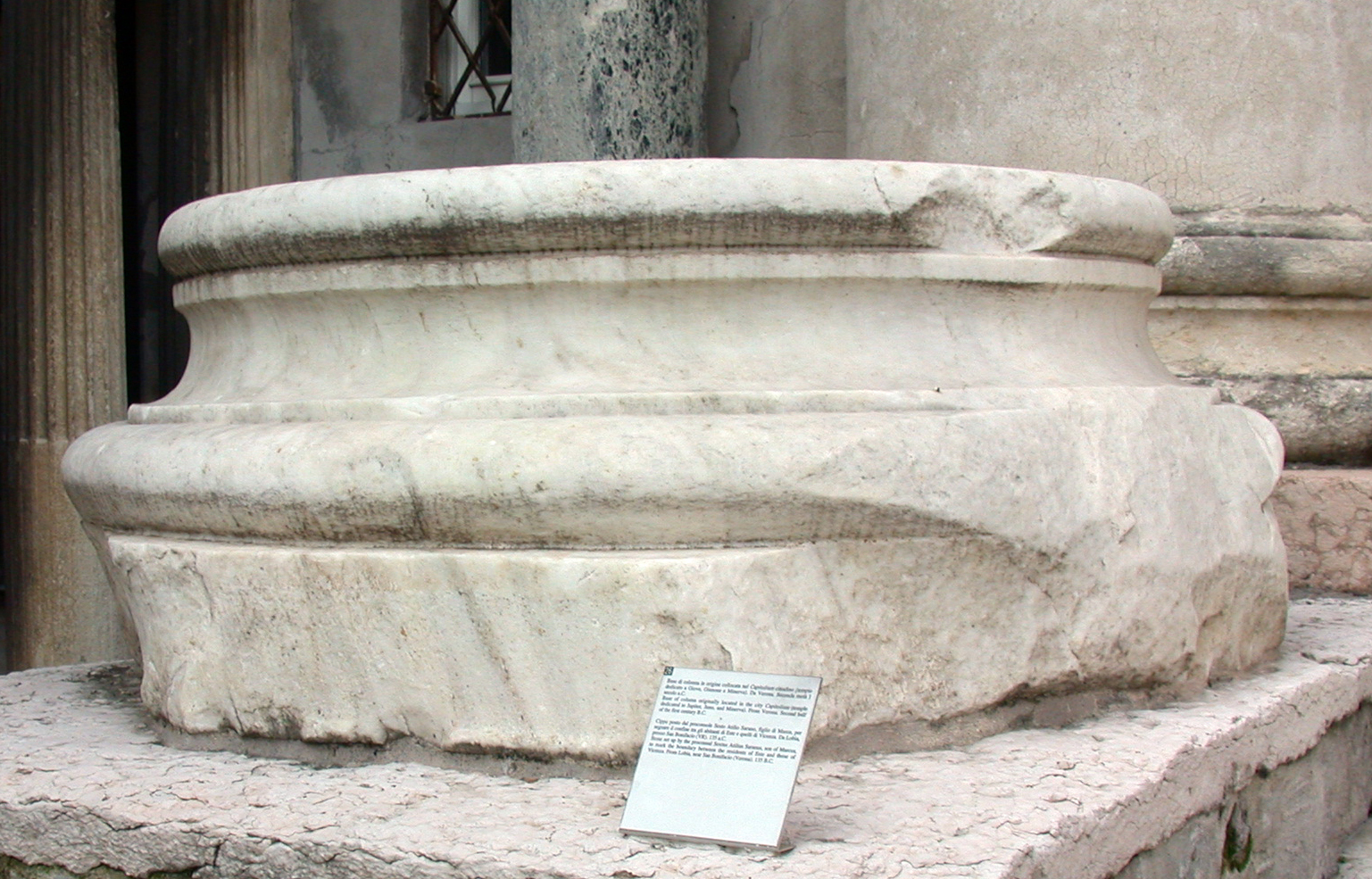
One of the bases of the Capitolium, preserved in the Maffeian Lapidary Museum.

The temple building, of Tuscan order, had three inner chambers. Each chamber had three rows of six columns each at the front. The temple was inspired (both in shape and decoration, but not in the dimensions, that were reduced by about a third) by the Temple of Jupiter Optimus Maximus, located on the Capitoline Hill of Rome: it is an explicit, yet unusual, desire to imitate the great Roman antecedent building, a choice that therefore highlights the institutional, political and religious link with Rome through the reproduction of its symbolic building. The temple was 42.20 meters long, 35 meters wide, and had a 20.40 meters deep pronaos: these measures perfectly reflect the measures theorized by Vitruvius for the Tuscan order. On the other hand, the foundation plinth,must have had a height of about 4 meters. The plinth was grafted on a level whose anthropic attendance is attested back to the 3rd-1st century BC. We infer this thanks to the discovery of ceramic fragments.

The access to the temple was granted by a large staircase, a small part of which was found in a cellar in Corso Porta Borsari 4. After this excavation, a hypothesis of how the area of the Capitolium could connect with the decumanus in front was made: a wide socle had to flank the road, allowing the outflow towards the temple staircase and guaranteeing access to the portico and the cryptoporticus on the side.

Easily available or even of poor quality materials were used for the construction, with stone reinforcements used only at the points with the greatest unloading of forces. Over time, however, it was enriched with marble, a bronze wall and floor decorations, as well as inscriptions and sculptures, of which very little remains. A fragment of marble engraved with the dedication IOM ("to Jupiter Optimus Maximus") made by a woman also attests to the custom of dedicating ex-voto, a sign not only of worship but also of obedience to the order of the state.

=== Cryptoporticus ===
The cryptoporticus performed the function of containing the embankment created to increase the space of the temple area. The side wings were about 11.50 meters away from the temple, while later the distance was probably reduced to only 5 meters, given the presence of the first decumanus. The naves were 4.50 meters wide each and they were covered by a barrel vault; thanks to the excavation of Corte Sgarzerie it is also possible to deduce that the naves had an original height of 4.80 meters and that they were divided by a spine wall supported by arches. Splayed openings every 4 meters contributed to the lighting and ventilation of the environment, but for proper ventilation a further measure was employed by coating the walls with dense tiles, as to create a cavity of 10-15 centimeters and ensure insulation from the humidity of the embankment.

== Cadastres ==
During the excavations in the cryptoporticus, two bronze fragments belonging to the cadastral tables of the Roman city were found. These constitute a rare example of an ancient cadastre, in this case rural, with administrative and fiscal functions.

One of the two fragments is the upper left corner of a bronze panel on which a grid of horizontal and vertical lines has been engraved. Inserted within each box we can see the coordinates of the holdings on the centuriated land, the measurements in jugerums and the names of the owners. This fragment is dated between 40 and 30 BC, and it has names such as those of Caius Cornelius Agatho and Marcus Clodius Pulcher, already known from other Veronese inscriptions of the same period. The second fragment, also dated to the second half of the 1st century BC, has quadrangular engravings. Of the seven preserved cells, only in the central one the names of the owners can be read; they have a clear Celtic origin (Bituci, Vindili, Segomari), however in this case the coordinates are missing. Worthy of noting is the fact that they are linked to small plots of land compared to those reported on the first fragment.

== See also ==
- Corte Sgarzerie
- Archaeological area of Corte Sgarzerie

== Bibliography ==
- Bolla, Margherita (2009). Testimonianze archeologiche di culti a Verona e nel territorio in età romana. Vol. Verona storico-religiosa. Testimonianze di una storia millenaria. Verona: Fondazione centro studi Campostrini. pp. 2–23.
- Cavalieri Manasse, Giuliana (1990). Il Foro di Verona: recenti indagini. Vol. Collection de l'École française de Rome. Rome: École française de Rome. pp. 579–616.
- Cavalieri Manasse, Giuliana (1995). Il Foro e il Campidoglio di Verona. Vol. Antichità Altoadriatiche. Udine: Arti Grafiche Friulane. pp. 244–261.
- Cavalieri Manasse, Giuliana (2008). L'area del Capitolium di Verona. Ricerche storiche e archeologiche. Soprintendenza per i Beni Archeologici del Veneto.
- Cavalieri Manasse, Giuliana; Cresci, Giovannella (2005). Un nuovo frammento di forma dal Capitolium di Verona. Vol. rans Padum...usque ad Alpes. Roma tra il Po e le Alpi: dalla romanizzazione alla romanità. Rome: Edizioni Quasar. pp. 21–53.
- Giuliani, Cairoli Fulvio (1973). Contributi allo studio della tipologia dei criptoportici. Vol. Publications de l'École française de Rome. Rome: École française de Rome. pp. 79–115.
