= Corte Sgarzerie =

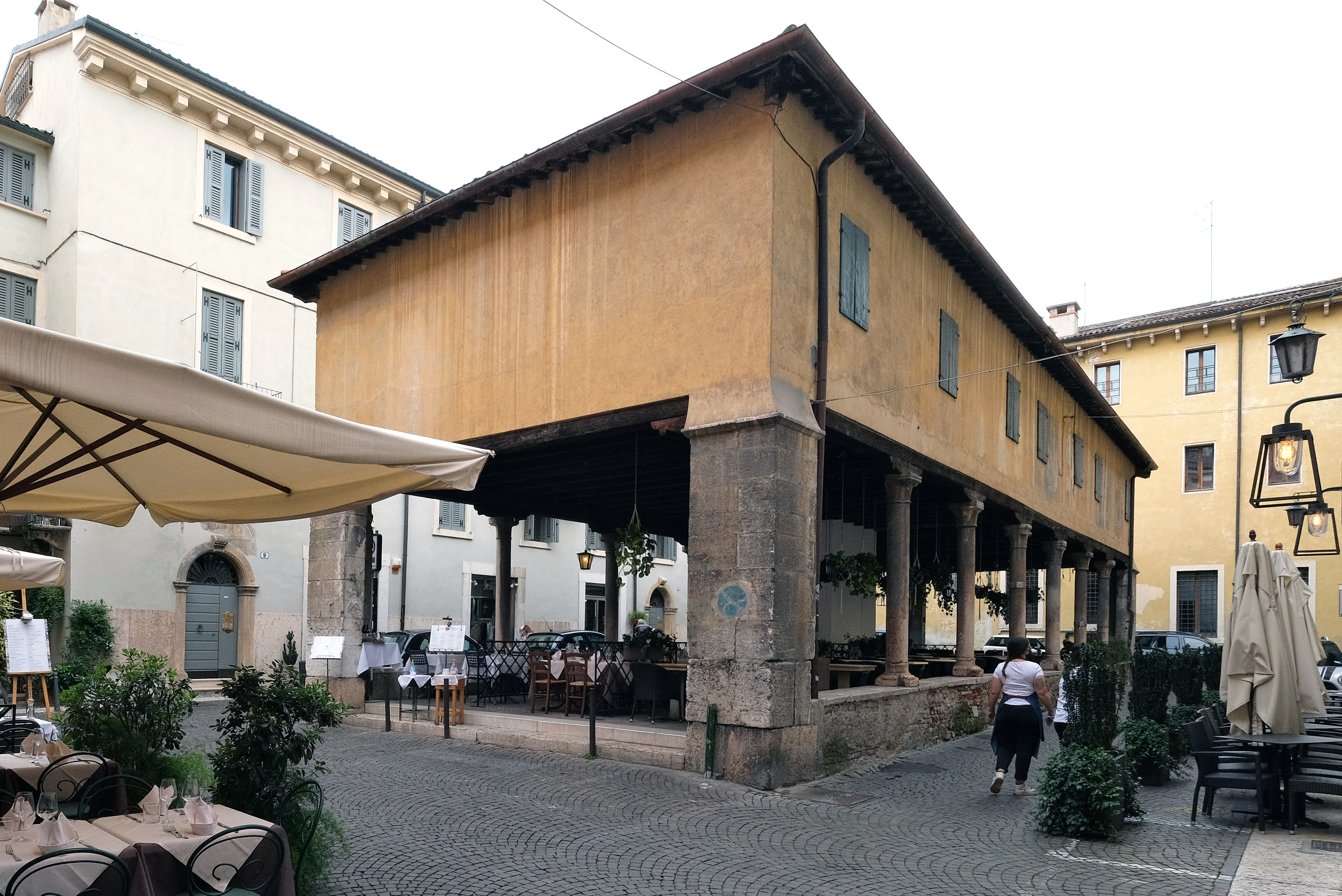
- The 4th century Mangano loggia, at the center of the court
- Interactive map of the Corte Sgarzerie area

General information
- Coordinates: 45°26′36″N 10°59′44″E
- Year built: 13th century

Corte Sgarzerie is a monumental complex located in the heart of the old town of Verona, at a short distance from Corso Porta Borsari and Piazza delle Erbe, consisting of a square by the same name and a late-medieval loggia. Under the square are located the remnants of the Veronese Capitolium. It is a place deeply rooted to wool production, as the toponym itself attests – sgarzarie is a Veronese form of the word scardasserie, places dedicated to the card-making activity.

== History ==
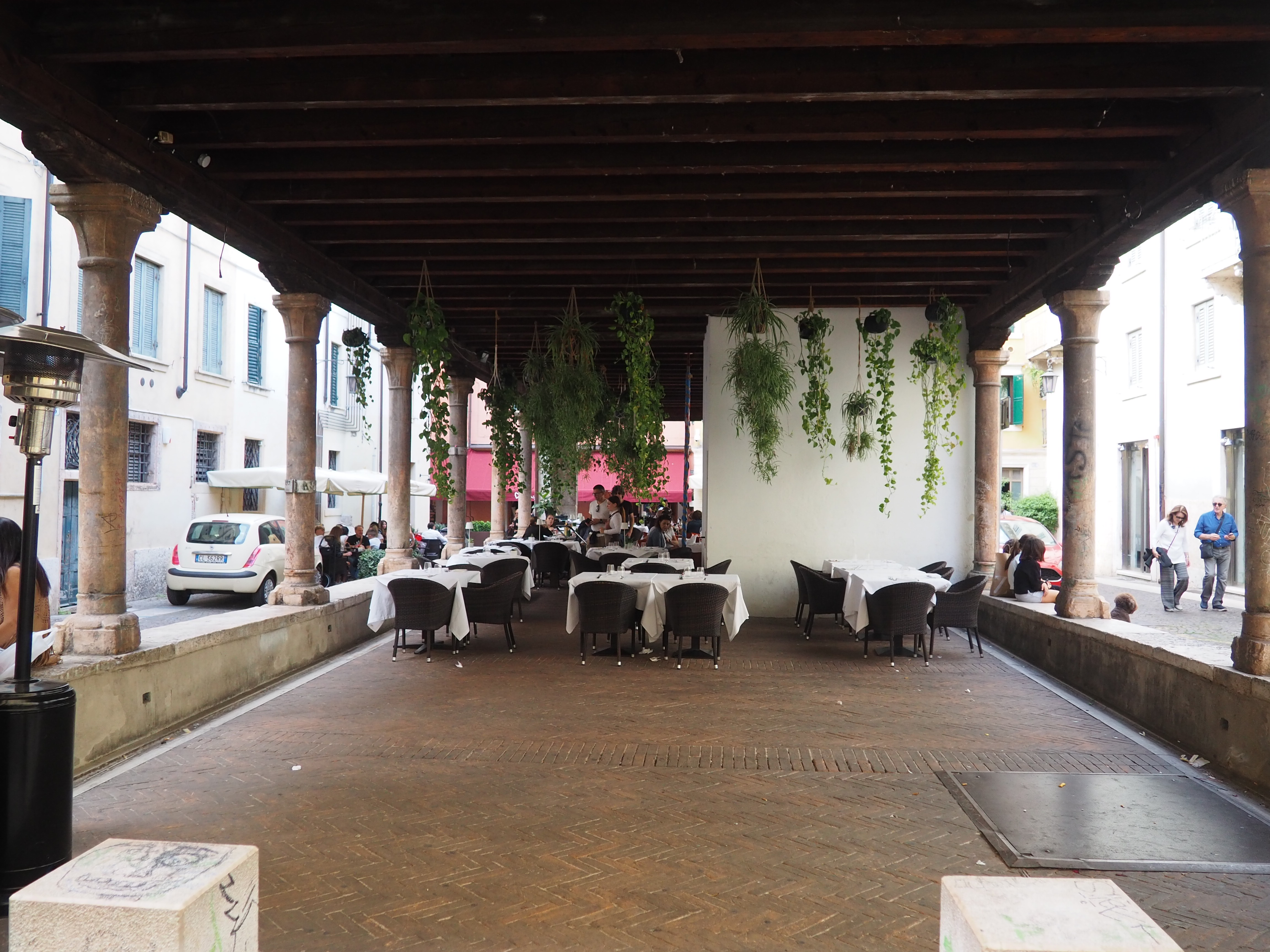
The interior of the loggia

During the thirteenth century the Veronese wool industry activity increased significantly, to the point that the techniques of production and the production itself became highly sought after in several markets of northern and central Italy.

During the principality of Mastino II della Scala, the activity reached even higher levels of production, and several measures were taken to better organize the whole manufacturing effort, concentrated mainly at Corte Sgarzerie. Therefore, it was likely that during his government that the so-called Mangano loggia was built; this was located in the center of the square and still gives its unique characteristics today; this was in fact necessary to give more space to wool workers, as it could measure, weigh and stamp products and gave opportunity to negotiate and haggle.

== Description ==
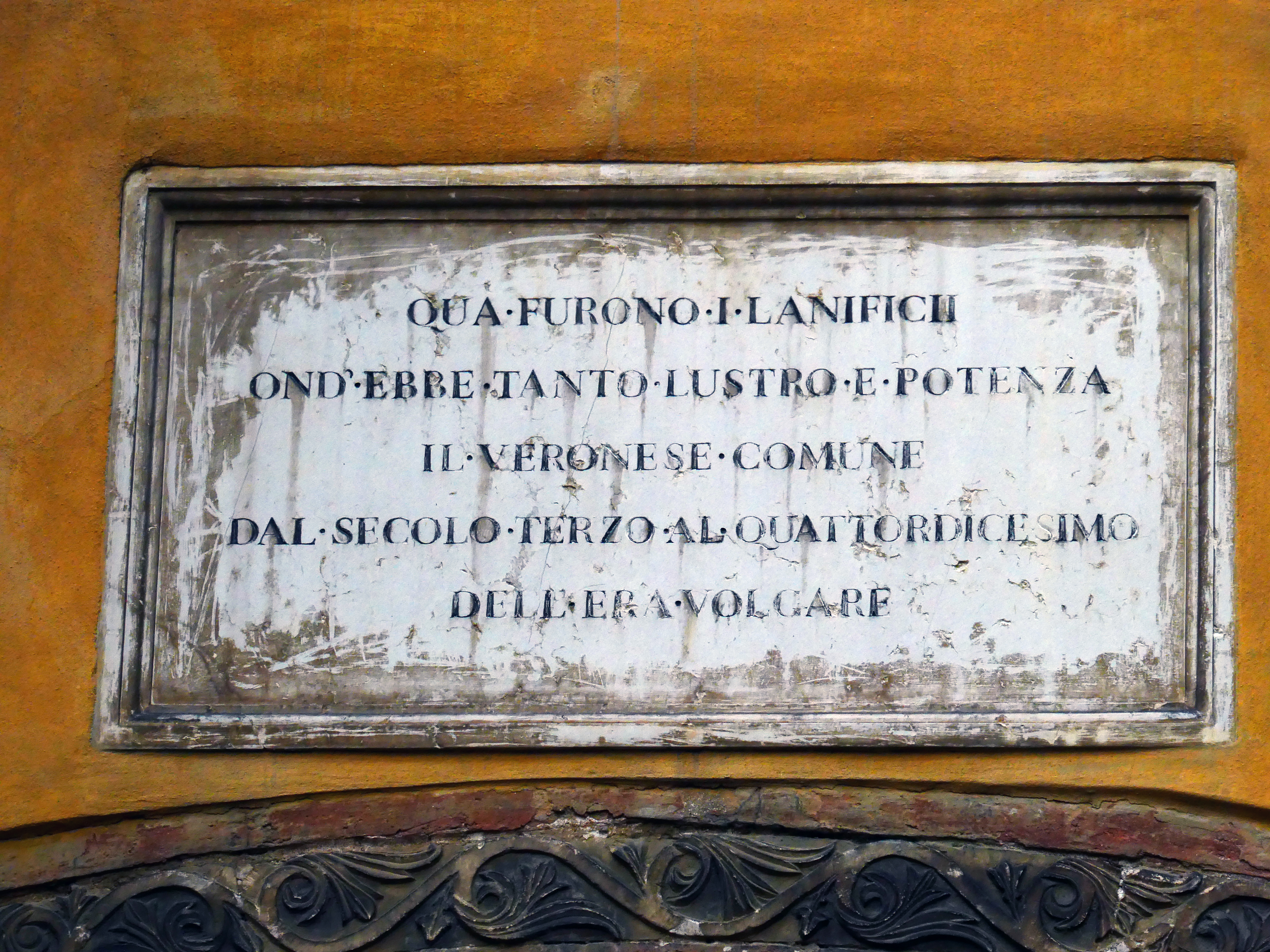
The tombstone on the entrance arch to the court

An inscription placed on the arch at the entrance leading to the court recalls the historical importance that this place had for the city: "Here were the wool mills where the municipality of Verona had so much luster and power from the third to the fourteenth century of the Common era". In the center, occupying almost entirely the small square, is the Mangano loggia, characterized by the columns made of red Verona marble supporting the upper floor, divided into various rooms currently home to several organizations.

== Archaeological area ==
The court gives access to the underground site of the Capitolium: the main temple of Roman Verona, consecrated to Jupiter, Minerva and Juno. Between 1988 and 2004 an archaeological excavation was conducted under the loggia, revealing a piece of the cryptoporticus that surrounded the temple on three sides, the remains of an ice-house, an underground area and the foundation of a medieval tower house. The archaeological area of Corte Sgarzerie is the only access point to the Capitolium that is open to the public.

== See also ==
- Monuments of Verona
- History of Verona

== Bibliography ==
- Fontana, Loris Annibale (1967). La Loggia delle Sgarzerie (in Italian). Verona: Zendrini.
