= Corso Sant'Anastasia, Verona =

Painting by Richard Parkes Bonington

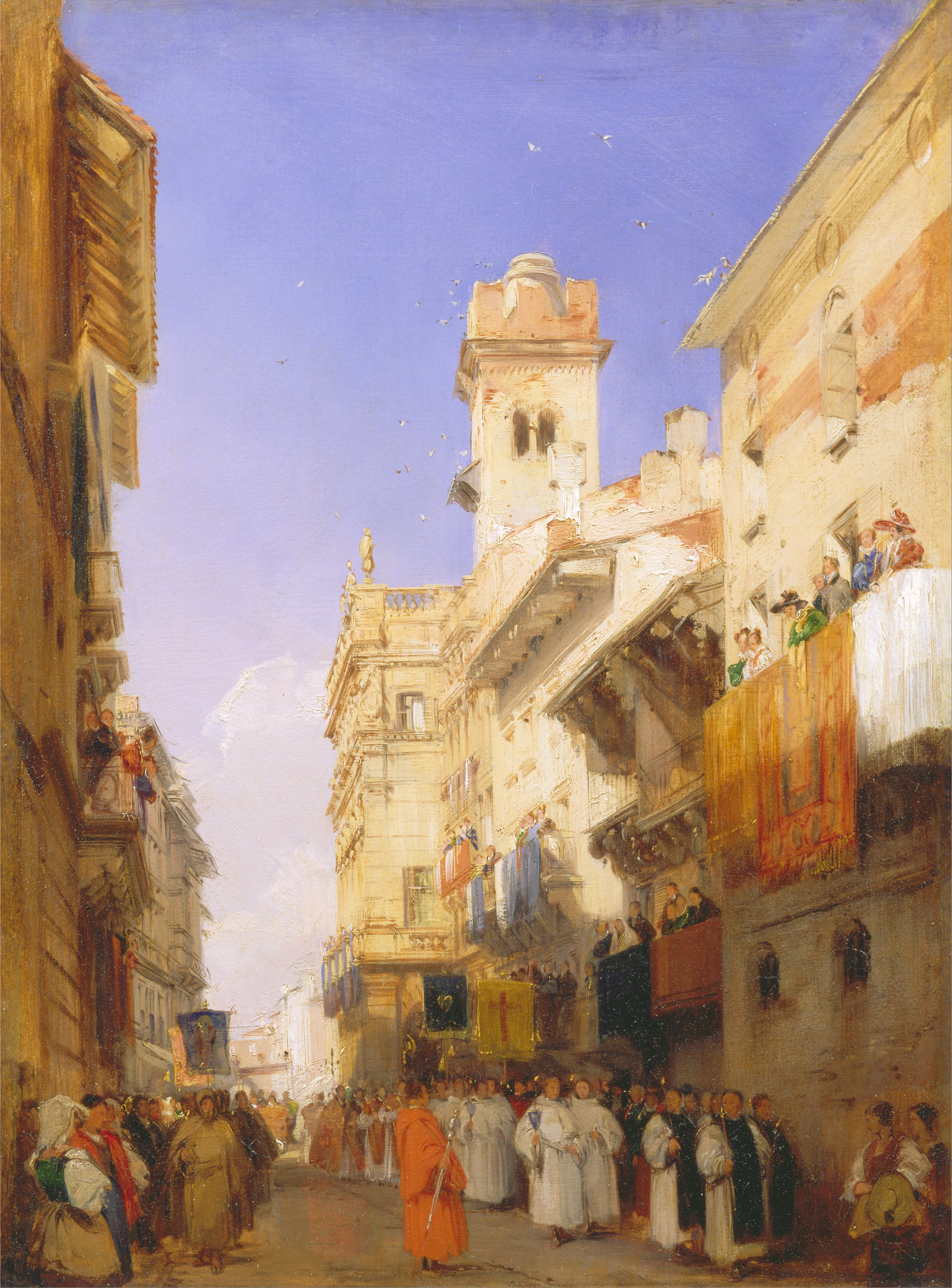
- Artist: Richard Parkes Bonington
- Year: 1828
- Type: Oil on millboard, landscape
- Dimensions: 65.1 cm × 44.1 cm (25.6 in × 17.4 in)
- Location: Yale Center for British Art; New Haven, Connecticut

Corso Sant'Anastasia, Verona is an 1828 cityscape painting by the British artist Richard Parkes Bonington. It depicts a scene in the city of Verona looking along the Corso Sant'Anastasia with the Palazzo Maffei on the right. He added a religious procession to enhance the bright colours of the work. Bonington briefly visited the city during a trip to Venice in 1826. By the time he painted this work he was in London and based it on sketches he had made during his Italian visit.

It was likely the final work produced by Bonington's as he died from tuberculosis the same year. Today it is in the Yale Center for British Art as part of the Paul Mellon collection. A version of the same scene in watercolour is in the Victoria and Albert Museum.

== Bibliography ==
- Bury, Stephen (ed.) Benezit Dictionary of British Graphic Artists and Illustrators, Volume 1. OUP, 2012.
- Cormack, Malcolm. Bonnington. Phaidon Press, 1989.
- Herrmann, Luke. Nineteenth Century British Painting. Charles de la Mare, 2000.
- Noon, Patrick & Bann, Stephen. Constable to Delacroix: British Art and the French Romantics. Tate, 2003.
- Pointon, Marcia R. Bonington, Francia & Wyld. Bradford, 1985
