= Domus Mercatorum =

Coordinates: 45°26′33.83″N 10°59′49.62″E

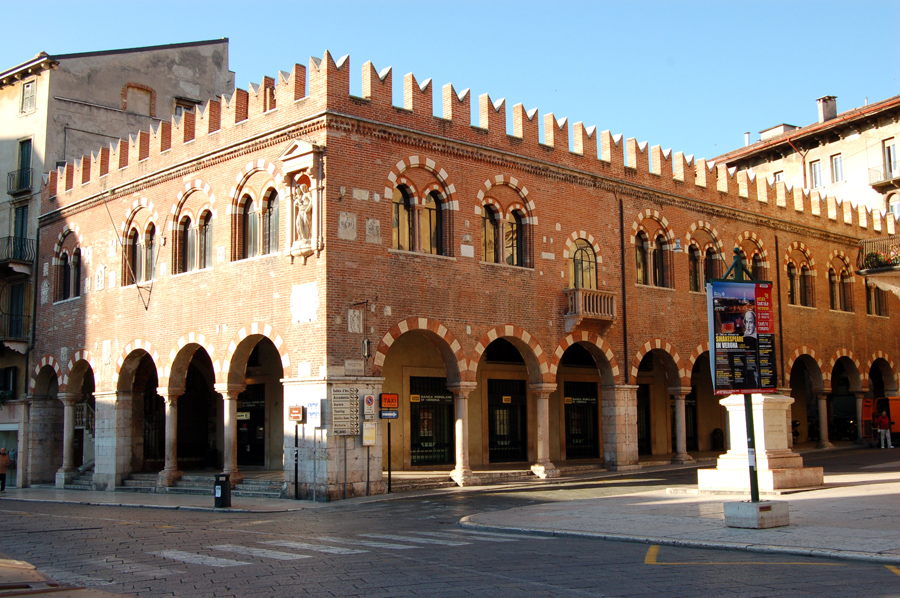
Domus Mercatorum.

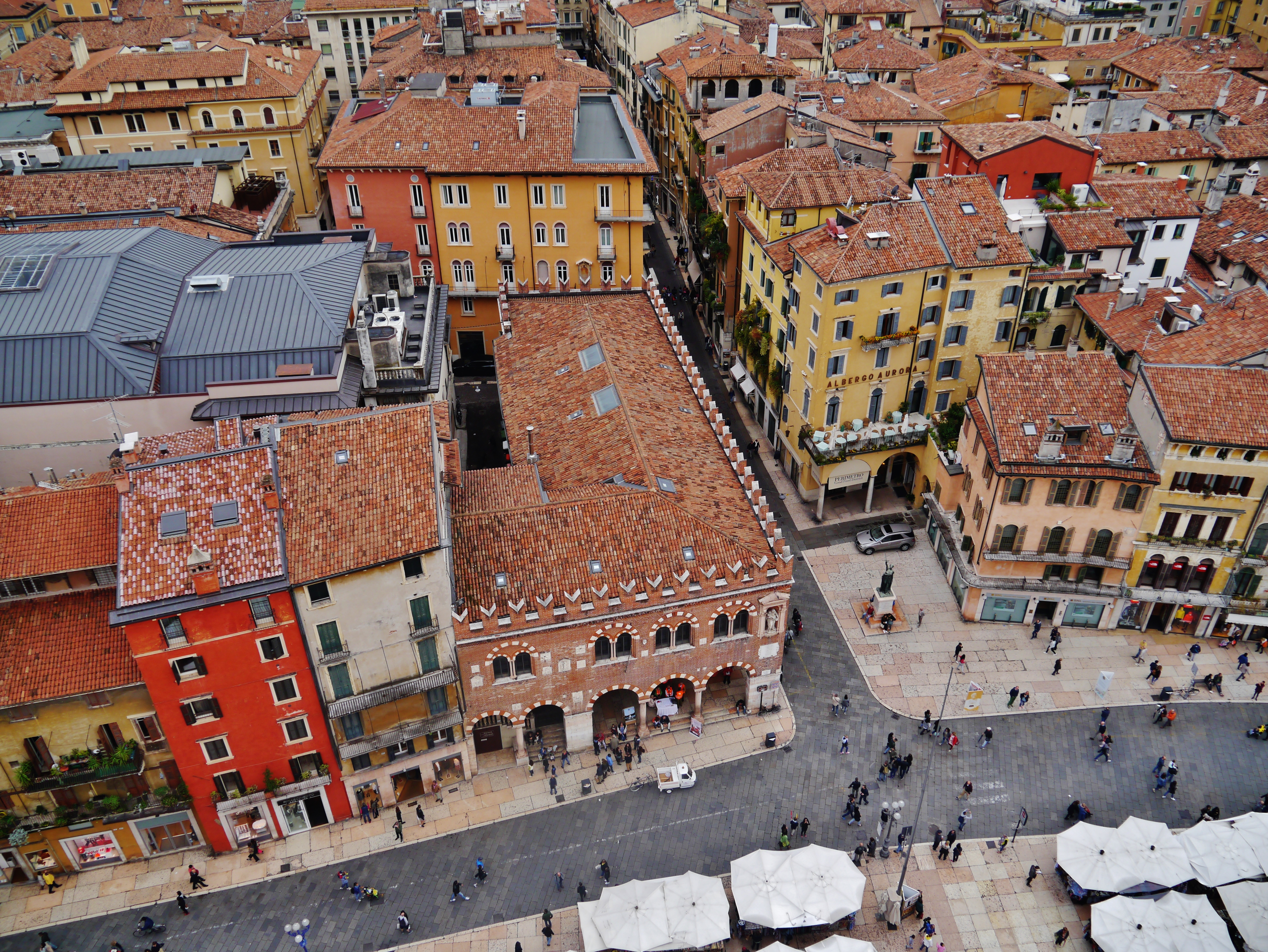

The Domus Mercatorum or Casa dei Mercanti is a medieval edifice at Piazza delle Erbe in Verona, northern Italy. During the Middle Ages it was home to the Casa dei Mercanti, the guild of the city's merchants, while today is home to the Banca Popolare di Verona.

== History ==
The buildings were constructed in 1210, in wood, to house the local merchants association. In 1301 Alberto I della Scala, a few years before his death, had it remade in stone, especially intended as the wool trading center (the Scaliger were a family of merchants before reaching the rule of the city). The Domus' podestà also acted as judge in the controversies and legal issues between the Veronese merchants and manufacturers.

During the century, the Domus underwent several restorations until, at the end of the 19th century, it was tentatively restored to the original medieval appearance. Today it has a portico supported by columns and pilasters, and a façade with mullioned windows and merlons.

== Sources ==
- Lenotti, T. (1964). Palazzi di Verona. Verona: Vita veronese.
