= Palazzo Maffei, Verona =

Palace in Verona, Italy

Coordinates: 45°26′37″N 10°59′48″E

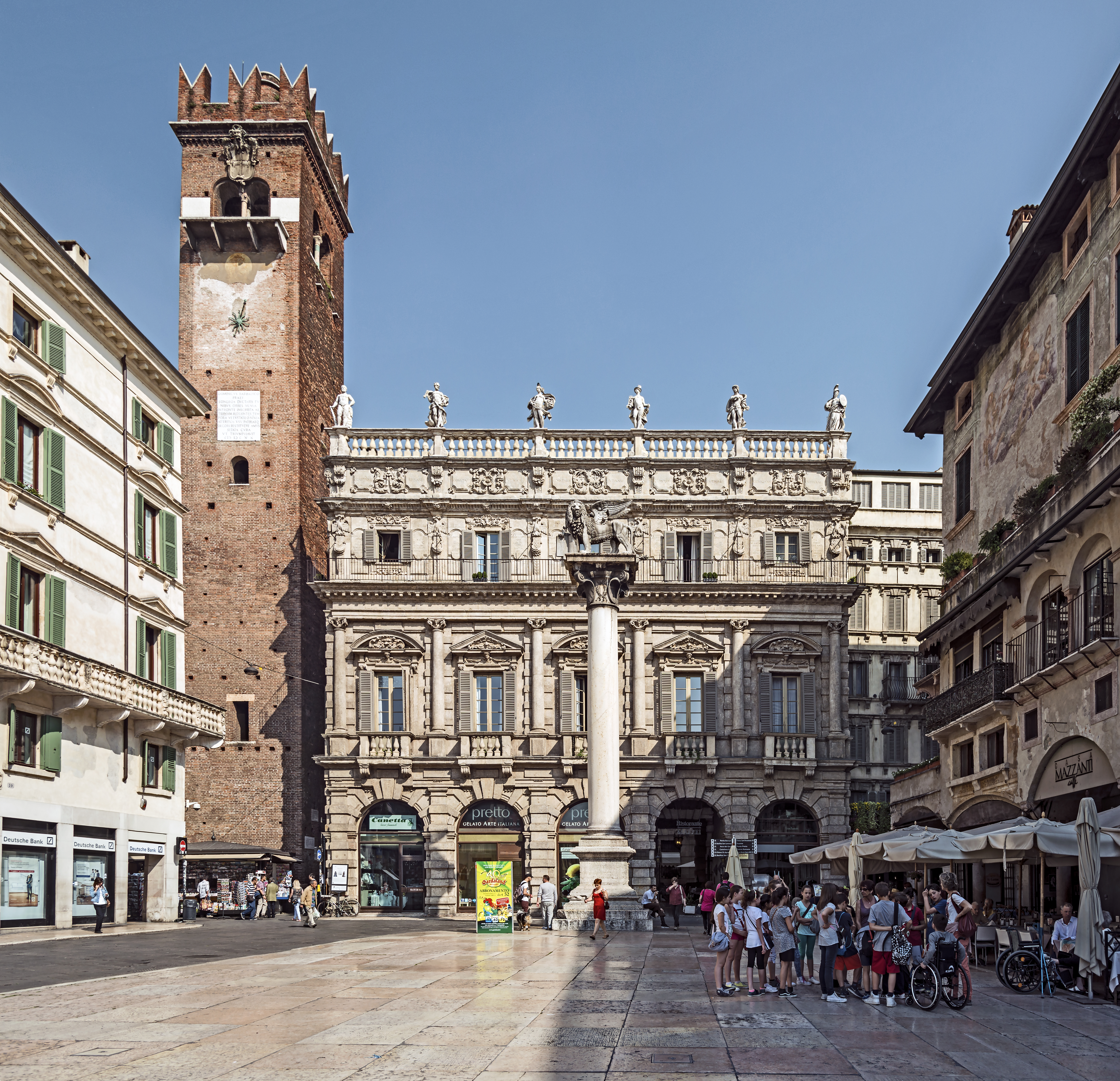
Palazzo Maffei.

Palazzo Maffei is a historical palace in Verona, northern Italy, on the north-western side of Piazza delle Erbe.

A building existed in the current location in the 15th century, but on 20 December 1469 the nobleman Marcantonio Maffei decided to expand it by adding a third floor. Construction works ended only in 1668.

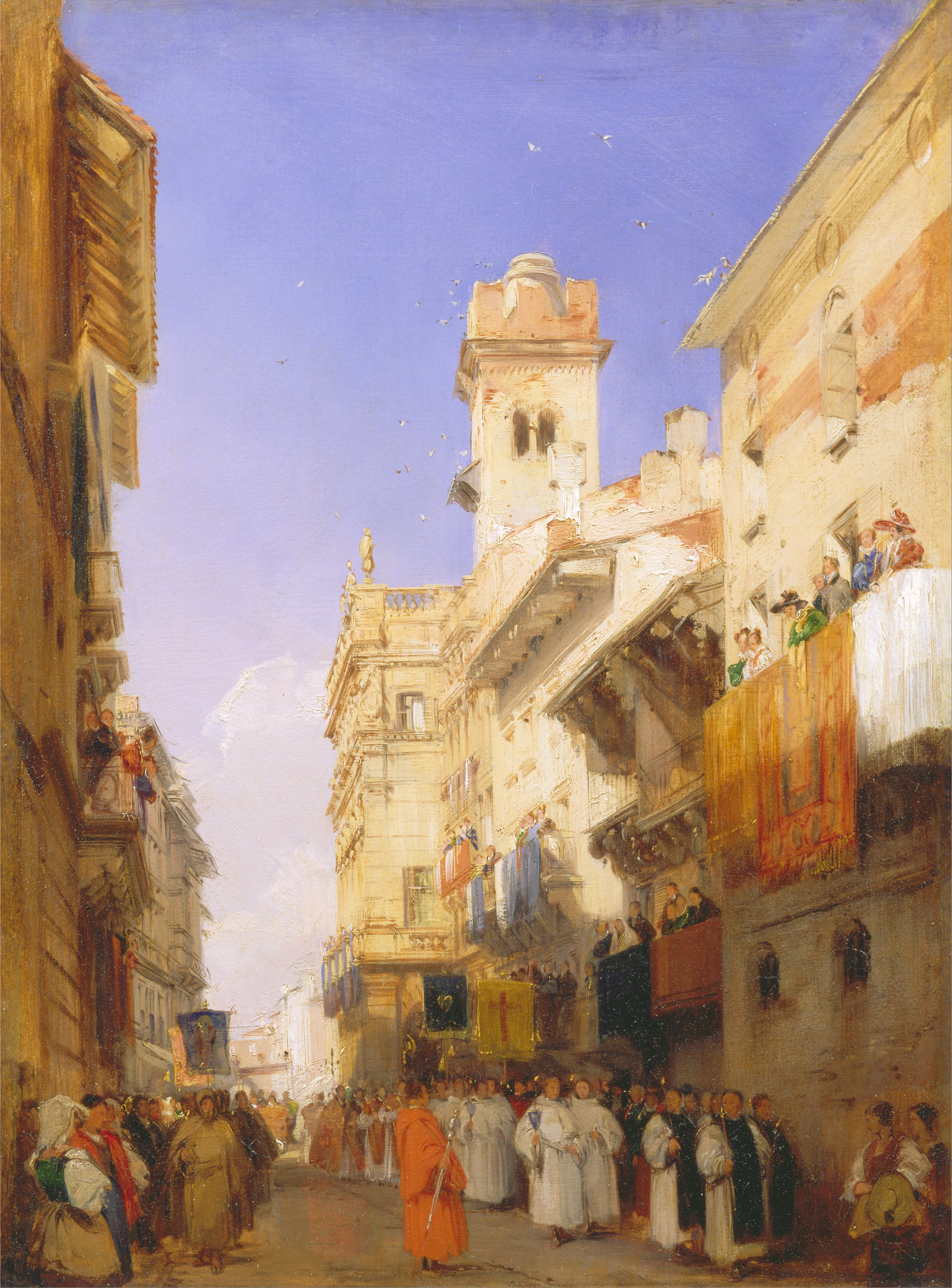
Corso Sant'Anastasia, Verona by Richard Parkes Bonington, 1828. The Palazzo can be seen on the right

The three-floor façade of the palace is in Baroque style. It starts at a slightly higher level than the square: underneath remains can be seen of the ancient Roman Capitoline Hill, where the Piazza delle Erbe later was settled.

The first floor has five arcades between tympani. Over each arcade a window with an elegant balcony is placed, separated by Ionic semicolumns decorated by large masks.

The third floor is in the same style as the second, but with smaller windows and fake framed columns. The top of the facade is designed as a balustrade with six statues of divinities: Hercules, Jupiter, Venus, Mercury, Apollo and Minerva. The latter are cut from local marble, with the exception of the Hercules, which is believed to have come from an ancient temple once located on the Roman Capitoline Hill.

The interior is home to a bizarre helicoidal stone staircase, that leads from the underground stores all the way up to the roof.

== Sources ==
- Lenotti, T. (1964). Palazzi di Verona. Verona: Vita veronese.
