= Piazza delle Erbe, Verona =

Square in Verona, Italy

Coordinates: 45°26′35″N 10°59′50″E

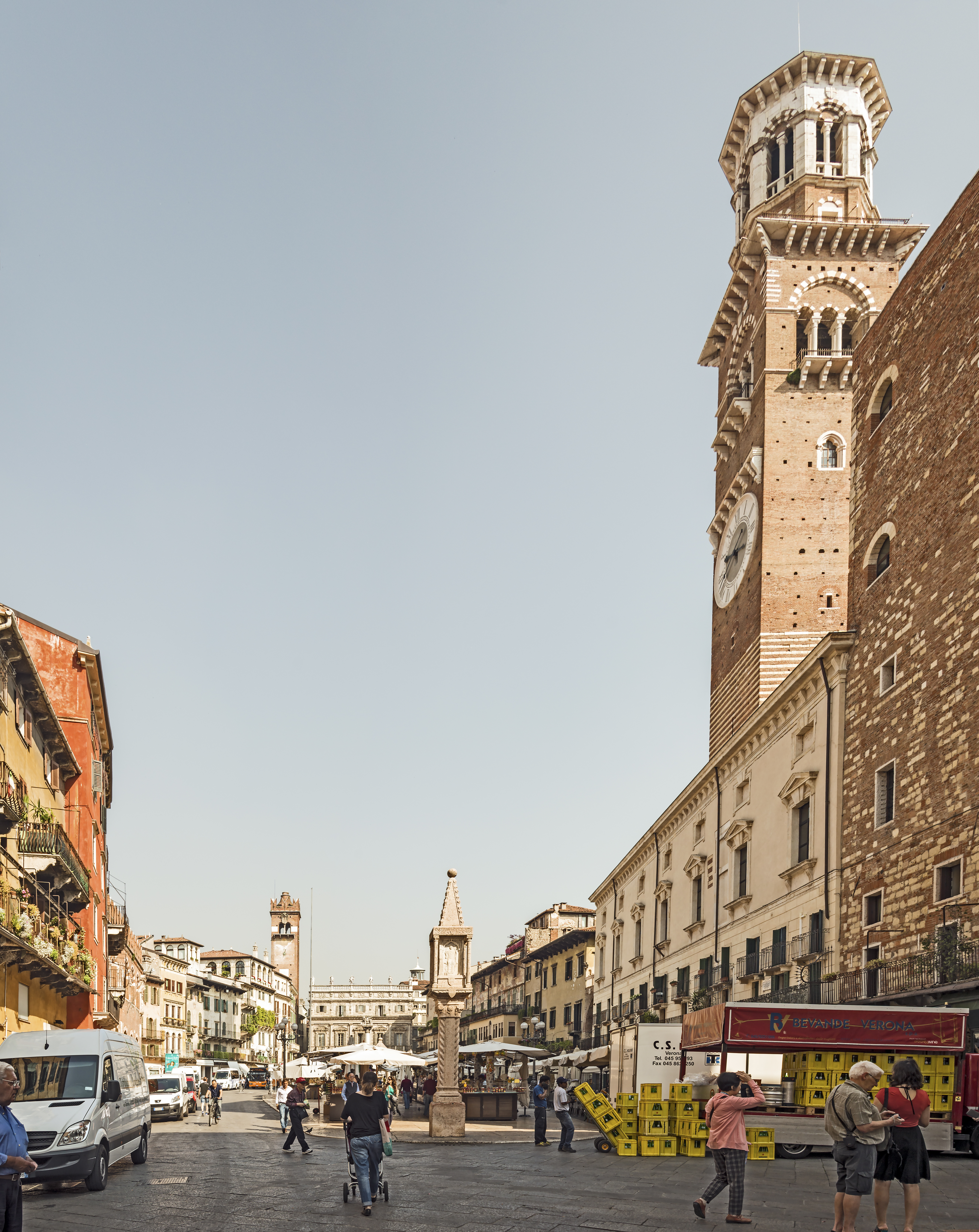
Piazza delle Erbe

Piazza delle Erbe (Market's square) is a square in Verona, northern Italy. It was once the town's forum during the time of the Roman Empire.

== Description ==
The northern side of the square is occupied by the ancient town hall, the Torre dei Lamberti, the Casa dei Giudici ("Judges' Hall") and the frescoed Mazzanti Houses. The western side, the shortest one, features the Baroque Palazzo Maffei, decorated by statues of Greek gods. It is faced by a white marble column, on which is St. Mark's Lion, symbol of the Republic of Venice.

The north-western side occupies the site of the ancient Roman Capitol Hill, which looked towards the forum. Numerous of its buildings facing the square have maintained façade frescoes. On the southern side is the crenellated Casa dei Mercanti ("House of the Merchants", also known as Domus Mercatorum), now the seat of the Banca Popolare di Verona. Other buildings, the tall houses of the Ghetto, are reminiscent of medieval tower houses.

The square's most ancient monument is the fountain (built in 1368 by Cansignorio della Scala), surmounted by a statue called Madonna Verona, which is however a Roman sculpture dating to 380 AD. Also historical is the capitello, dating to the 13th century, during which it was used for several ceremonies, including the oath of investment of the city's medieval podestà and pretors. Towards Via Cappello is another column, with a 14th-century aedicula with reliefs of the Virgin and the Saints Zeno, Peter and Christopher.

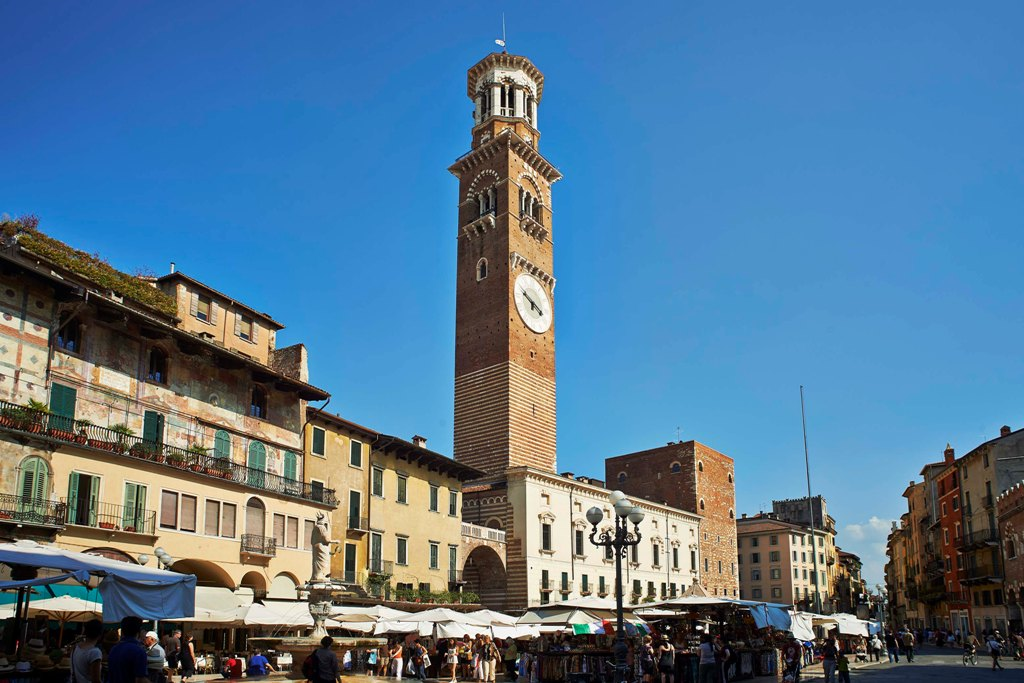
Torre dei Lamberti

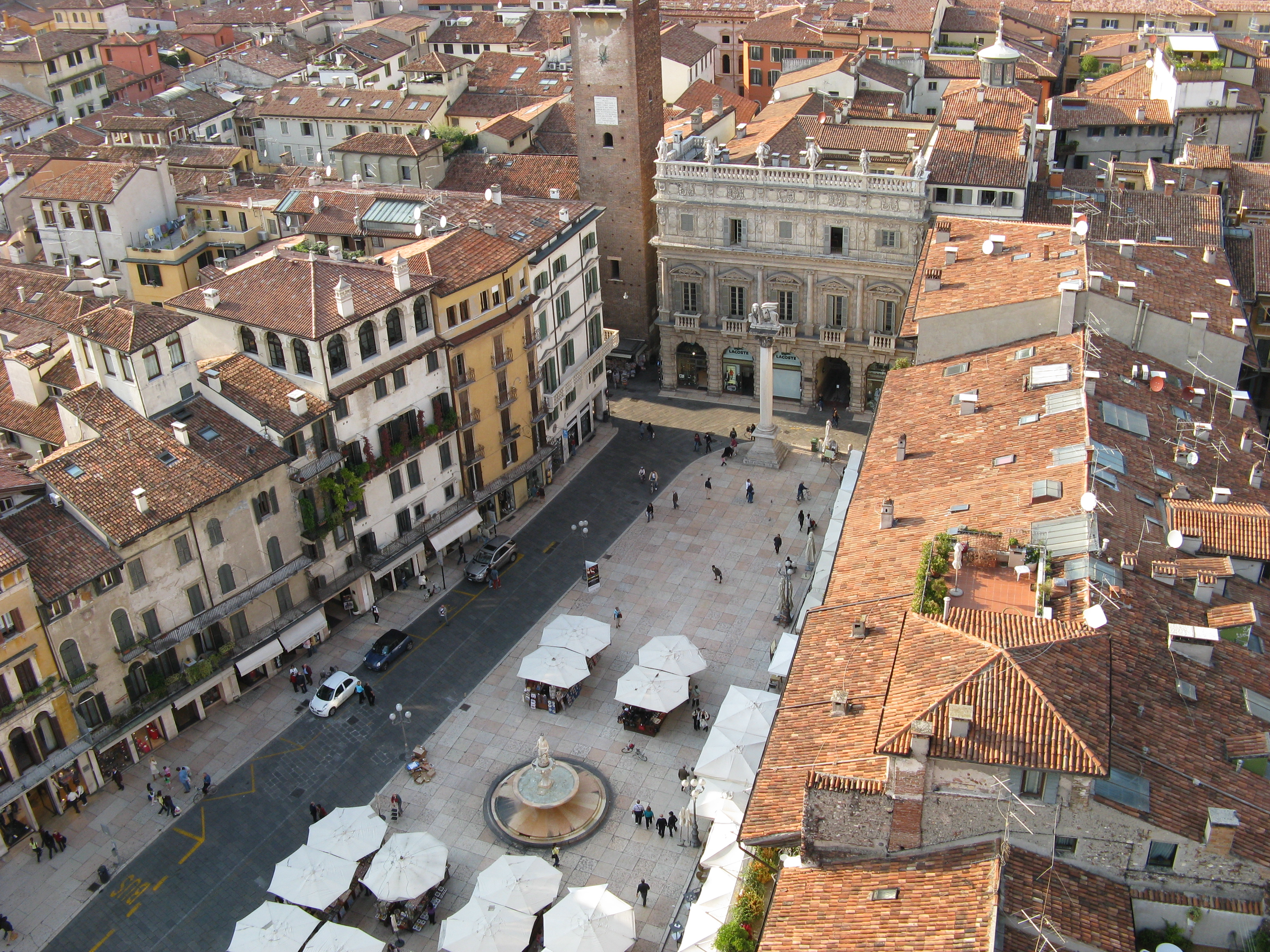

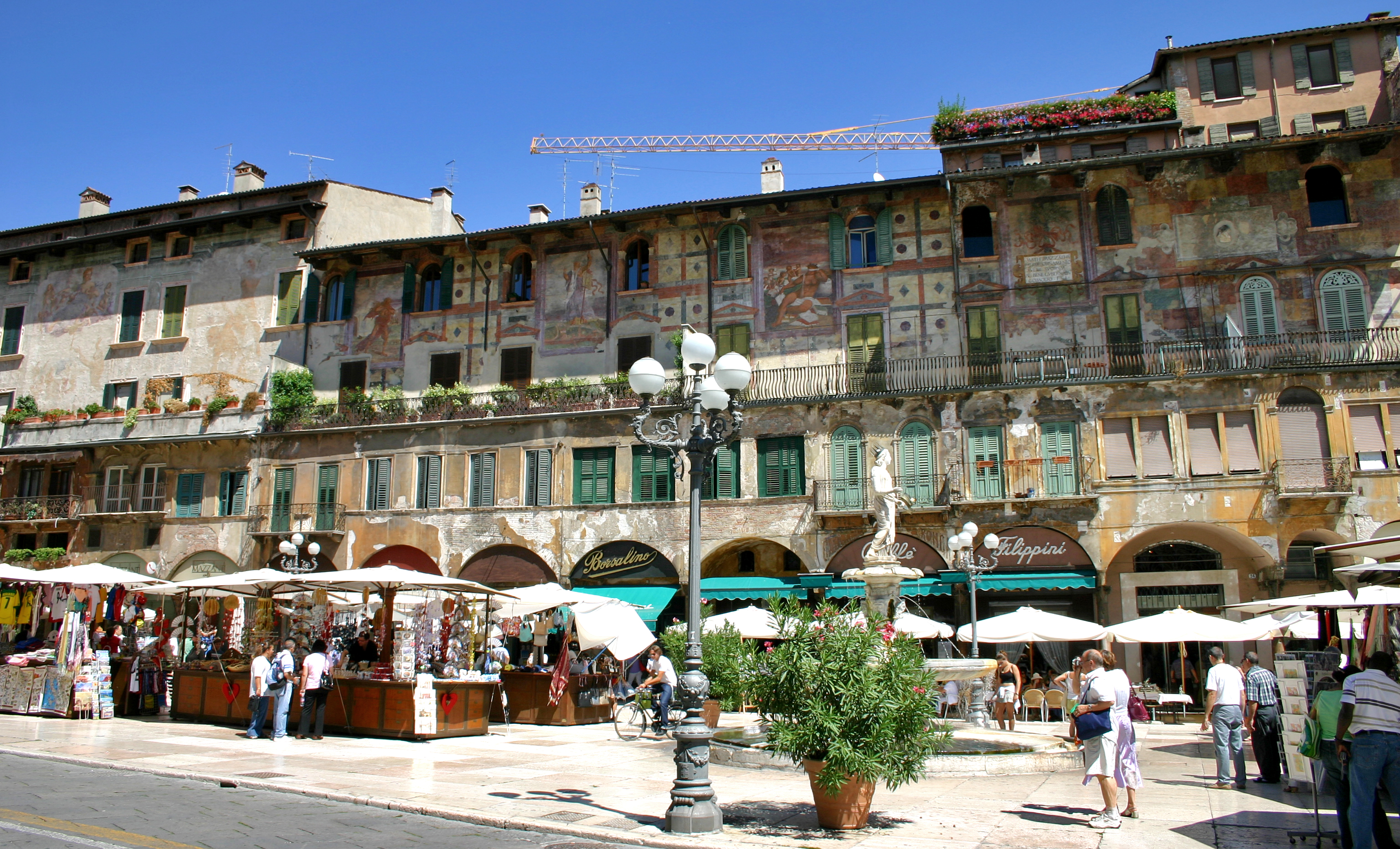
View of the square.

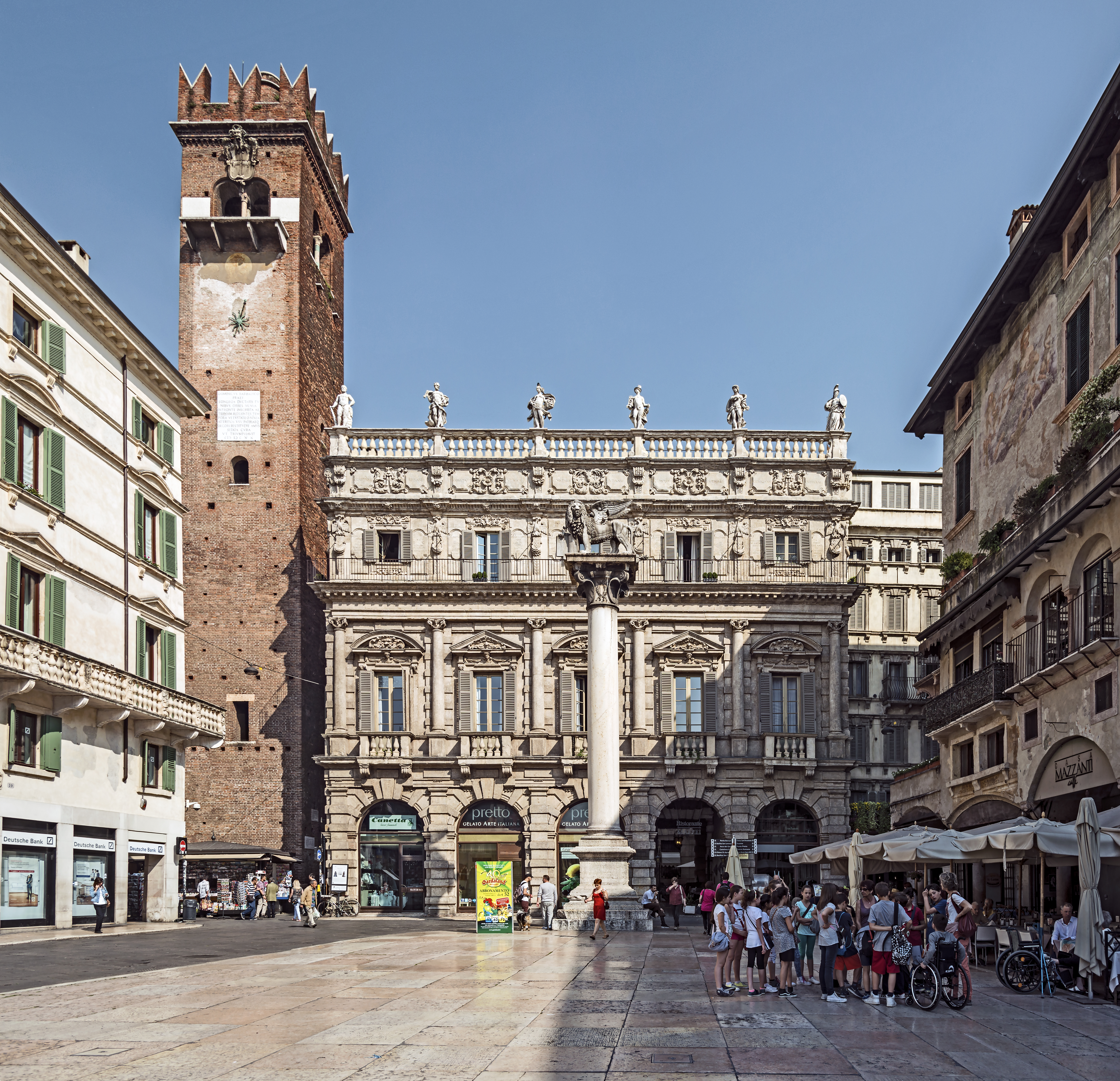
North part of the square, with Palazzo Maffei

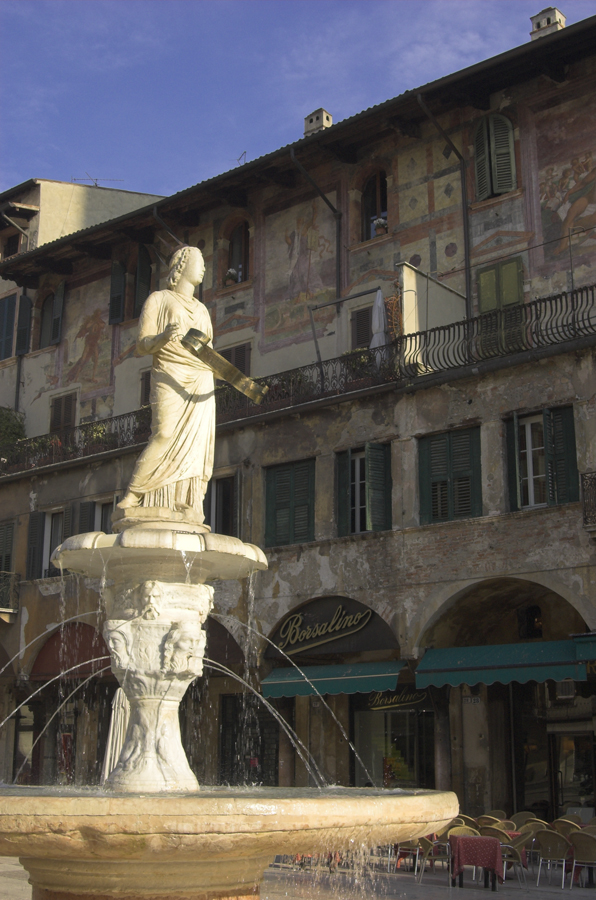
The fountain of Piazza delle Erbe.

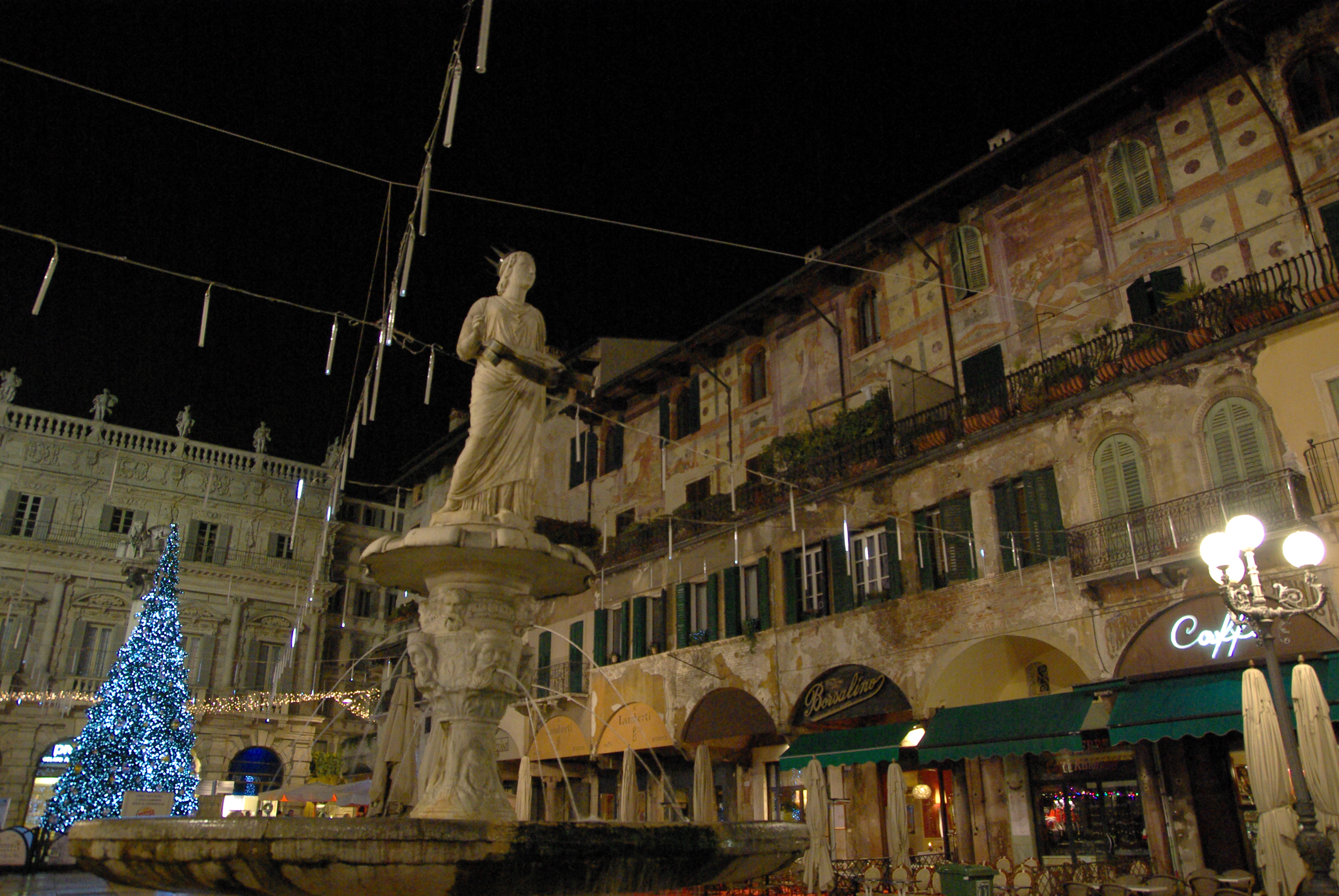
Christmas night with Fountain Madonna Verona (Roman sculpture dating to 380 AD)

== Buildings around the square ==
- Palazzo Maffei
- Torre dei Lamberti
- Casa dei Mercanti
- St. Mark's Lion
