= History of Verona =

History of the municipality of Verona, Italy

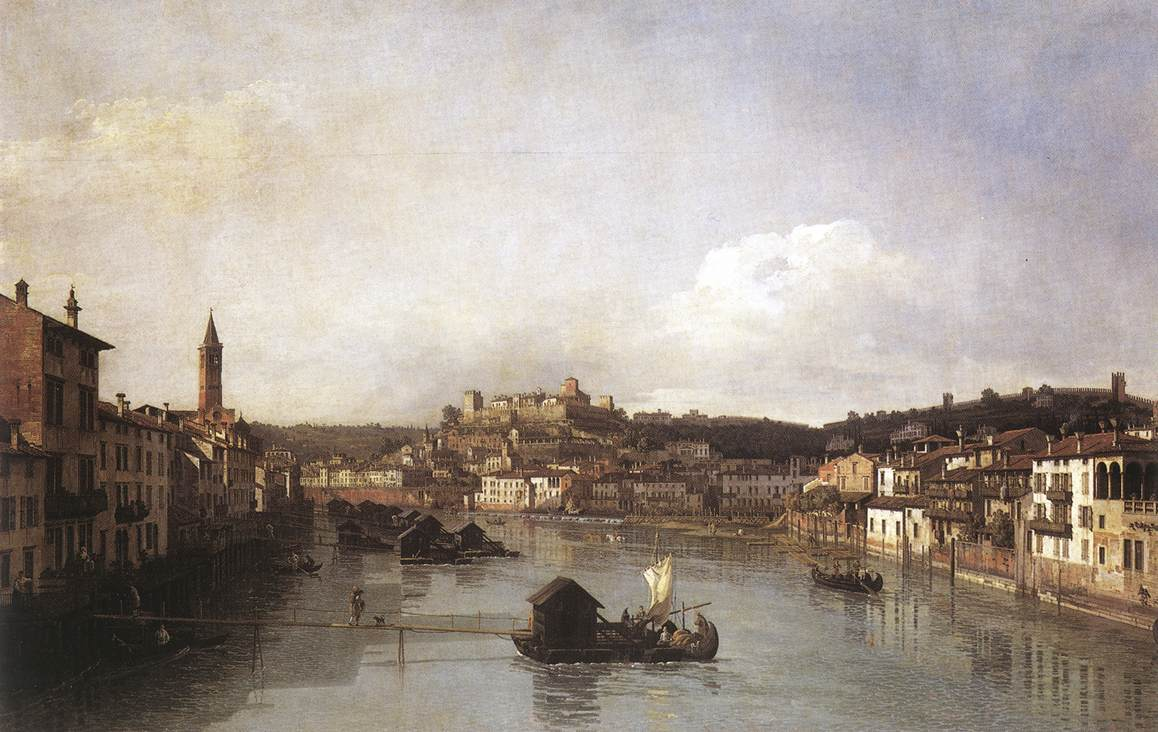
Panorama of Verona and its river in a mid-eighteenth century painting by Bernardo Bellotto, better known as Canaletto.

The history of Verona traces its origins from the foundation of the first settlement on San Pietro hill, probably dating back to the Neolithic period, to the present day: the evidence of such an ancient and rich history can be seen in the landmarks, in the streets and squares, even underground, where the ruins and artifacts of ancient prehistoric and particularly Roman civilizations emerge. It was especially during Roman rule that Verona prospered to become one of the most important cities in northern Italy, a status it maintained even after the fall of the Roman Empire, when the city was repeatedly elevated to capital of Roman-Barbarian kingdoms.

In the Late Middle Ages it became a Free Commune, often ravaged by bloody struggles between the Guelph and Ghibelline families: the former headed by the Sambonifacio, the latter by the Montecchi at first, and then by the Scaligeri; the latter were the primary actors in Veronese history for two centuries, and it was under their leadership that a smooth transition from Commune to Lordship took place. In 1388 the Scaliger city lost its independence to end up being subjugated first by the Visconti, and then by the Carraresi; however, as early as 1405 the devotion of Verona to Venice took place, which administered the city until its fall in 1797, a moment from which French and Austrian rule followed. Verona became part of the newly formed Kingdom of Italy only in 1866, following the Third Italian War of Independence.

== Foundation ==
Verona was founded in a place, the San Pietro hill, whose choice was propitiated by favorable natural conditions: the hill was easily defensible from external attacks, while the banks of the Adige could be dangerous, as the river exposed the surrounding areas to annual flooding; in addition, the relief was located at the end of the Adige valley, the main route of communication with the peoples of northern Europe.

=== Prehistory ===
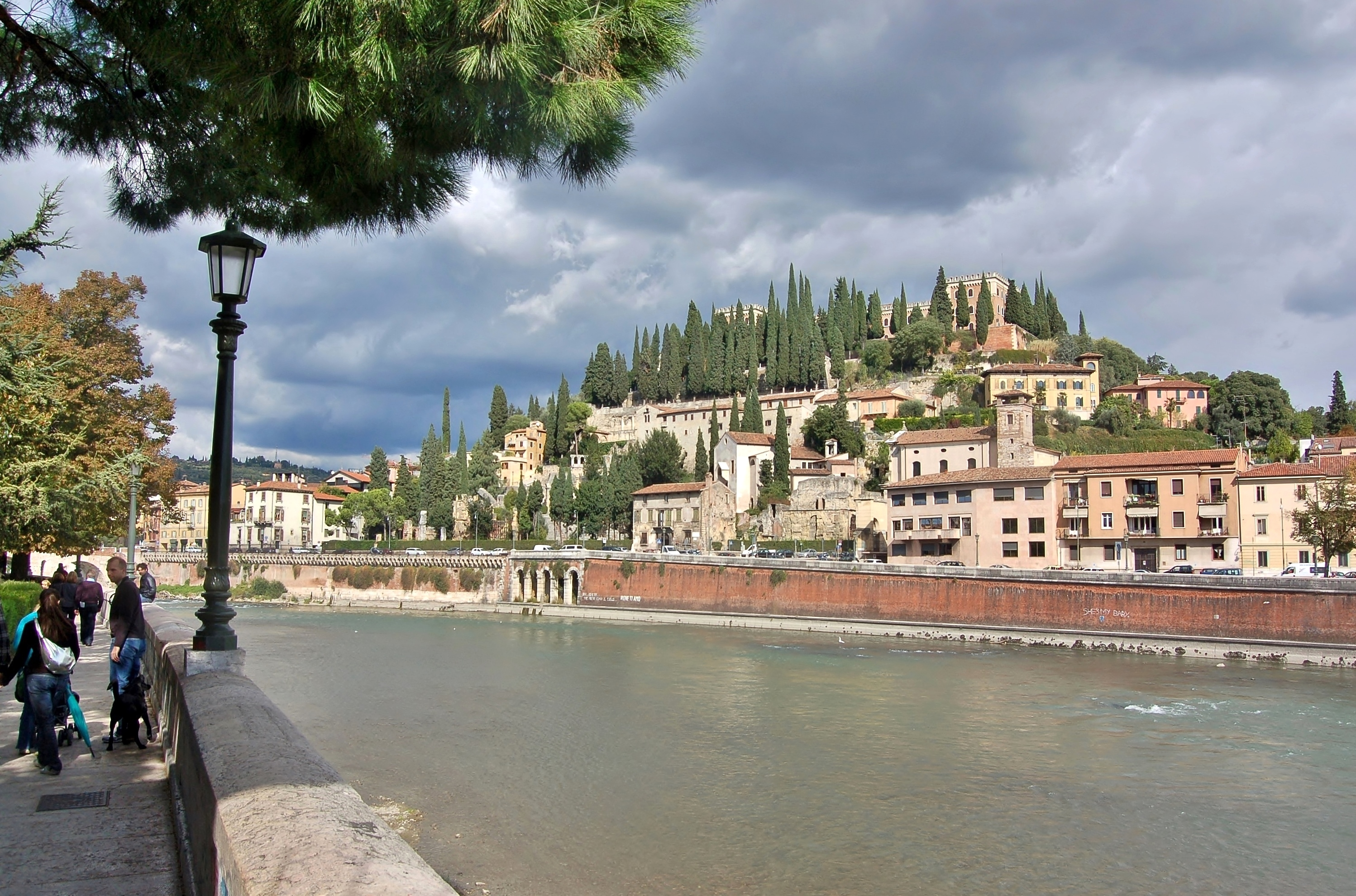
Colle San Pietro, a relief on which the prehistoric settlement arose.

As early as the Neolithic, there was the probable presence of a village at the southern area of Colle San Pietro, along the course of the Adige, since it was one of the few fordable points of the river, and in addition, from that point one could quickly reach the safe surrounding hills (rich in numerous prehistoric finds, which confirm its anthropization). Towards the end of the Neolithic, i.e., at the end of the 4th millennium BC, a number of nomadic groups migrated from southern France and settled at the site of today's Castel San Pietro (on the hill of the same name), where the first village safely sheltered from the annual flooding of the Adige River developed. From the first centuries of the 4th millennium B.C.E., the culture of square-mouthed vases also spread, with a geometric and linear style that would later evolve into a meander-spiral style.

The area of the hill of San Pietro is rich in archaeological sites, where even the remains of the houses that formed the ancient village have been found, some of them interpreted as structures and basement houses typical of Lessinia. The village grew over time and saw different populations settle there, such as the terramare inhabitants in the Bronze Age, while during the Iron Age protohistoric civilizations proliferated.

=== Protohistory ===
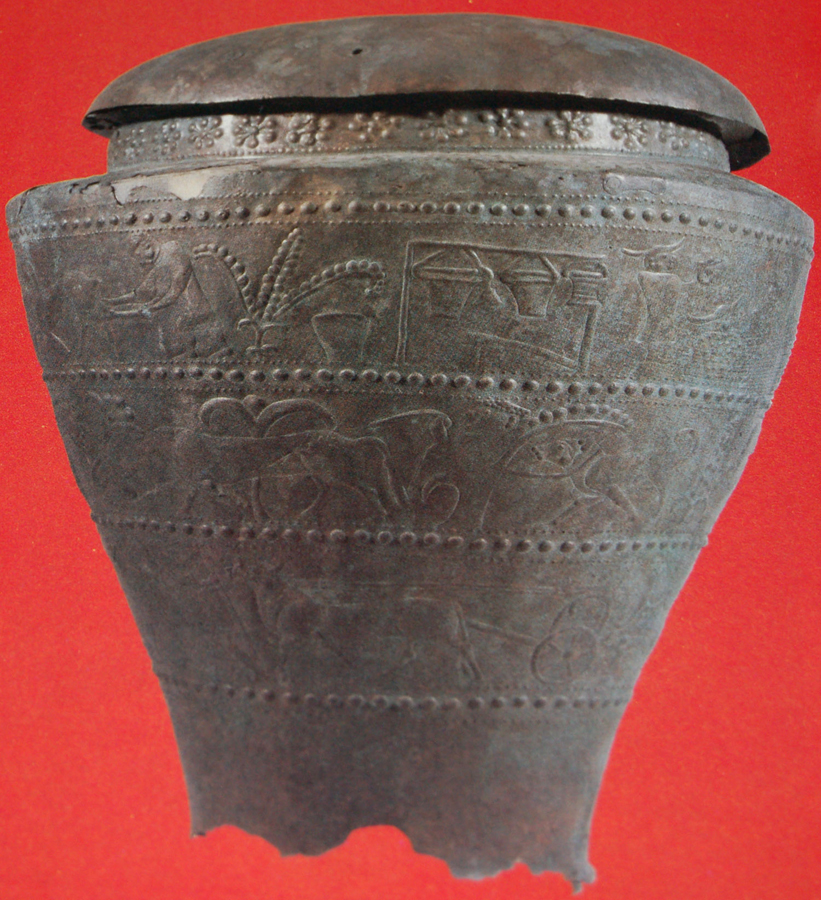
Ancient Venetian situla

Veneto was spared from the occupation of the Gallic peoples who in various waves from the west occupied the Po Valley, but relations between the ancient Veneti and the Gauls were nevertheless close. In Verona in particular, the situation was different from that of the rest of Veneto, as the Cenomani Gauls reached as far as the course of the Adige River: in the Verona area, Rhaetic artifacts or at least those related to Celtic culture have been found, and it is very likely that the village was inhabited jointly by the Cenomani and the Veneti.

Latin historians have variously credited Euganei, Rhaetians, Veneti, Etruscans or Cenomani Gauls with the origins of Verona: the historian Polybius states that in his time (2nd century BC.) the Venetian ethnic group was still numerous among the city's population, and indeed the Venetian presence is well documented, particularly at the hill of San Pietro, and the Venetian foundation hypothesis is based on this statement of his; the hypothesis of foundation by the Rhaetians and jointly by the Euganei, on the other hand, was formulated by Pliny the Elder (in particular, the presence of the former is ascertained by the numerous finds in the Veronese territory of their ceramics); that of the Cenomani Gauls was instead supported by Livy.

== Roman Verona ==
=== Early relations with the Roman Republic ===
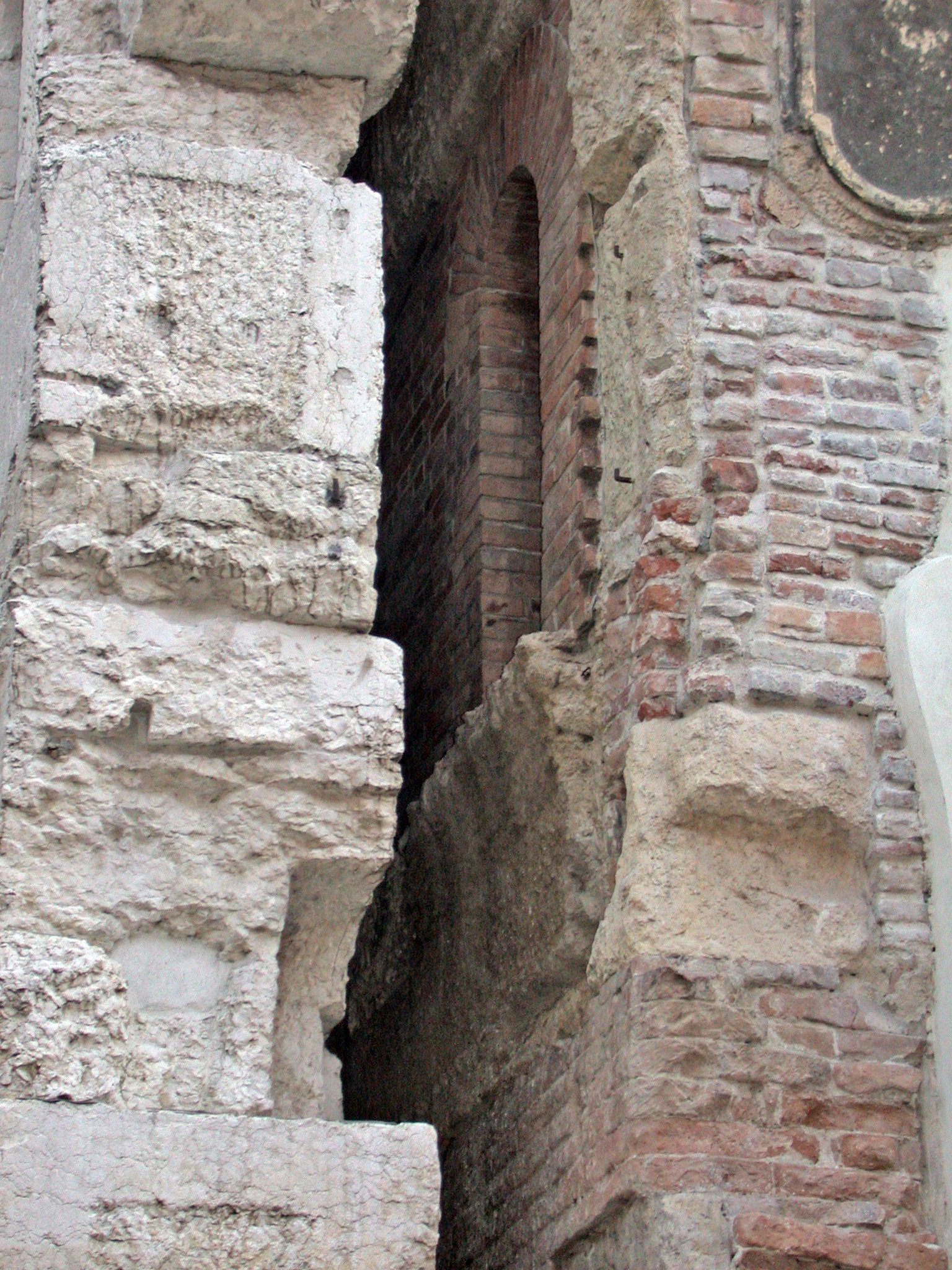
Some remains of Roman walls: brick masonry from the Republican period flanked by stone masonry from the Imperial period, near Porta Leoni

Before Latinization, the area of Verona was populated by Veneti and Cenomani Gauls: stronger in Verona was the Paleovenetian presence, evidenced by numerous finds belonging to that people. Cispadania was inhabited in the 3rd century B.C. by numerous warlike peoples, so the Romans turned to the Veneti for help, as they believed them to be blood relatives: this belief was the result of a legend that Antenor and the Eneti, among the few survivors of the Trojan War, were driven from their land and came after a long journey to the upper Adriatic Sea, to the region roughly corresponding to today's Veneto, where they hunted the Euganei. Cato the Censor stated that “Venetos Troiana stirpe ortos.”

The first contacts between Rome and Verona are documented around the 3rd century BC, and from the very beginning they were characterized by friendly and allied relations: as early as 283 BC the Roman Senate made a pact with the Veneti and the Cenomani Gauls to slow down the Gallic invasion, but there were probably earlier contacts, beginning in 390 BC, when the Gauls of Brennus invaded Rome but, through a diversion of the Veneti, were forced to come to terms with the Romans.

In 225 B.C. the Romans sent ambassadors to the Veneti and Cenomani to forge an alliance against the Boii and Insubri, who were threatening the Roman frontiers. Given the friendly relations, they allowed the Romans to erect a small garrison on top of St. Peter's Hill, from which they controlled the area. Even during the Second Punic War, the two local populations helped the Romans, while all the other Gallic populations had sided with Carthage. At the end of the war, in order to complete the subjugation of Cisalpine Gaul (Gauls and Ligurians did not accept Roman supremacy) Rome began a full-fledged war of conquest, again supported by these two peoples.

In 174 BC, following the subjugation of Cisalpine Gaul and the beginning of a new period of colonization of the Po Valley, the great strategic importance of Verona began to be apparent. The Roman Senate thus required Cenomani and Veneti to expand the fortified castrum, while Roman settlers and indigenous peoples laid the foundations for the building of a new city within the bend of the Adige River. By the time of the Third Punic War, vital communication routes such as the Via Postumia, which started from Genoa and reached Aquileia across the Po Valley, passed through Verona. It is assumed that at this time in history the Veneti were linked to the Romans by amicitia, unlike the Transpadan Gauls who were linked to Rome by foedus: this link was used mainly in Hellenistic states and provided for neutrality, which could become an alliance only in exceptional cases. Verona remained an ally of Rome even in the late 2nd and early 1st centuries B.C. against the invading Teutons and Cimbri (not to be confused with the Tzimber who repopulated Lessinia in the 13th century).

=== Res publica Veronensium ===
Veronese countryside in Roman times.

Latin law was extended to Cisalpine Gaul (granted by the Roman Senate in 89 B.C., following the Social War) through the Lex Pompeia de Transpadanis, proposed by Consul Pompey Strabo; pre-existing centers, including Verona, became therefore fictitious Latin colonies (i.e., without a proper deduction or the sending of settlers). The development of the city through a planned layout in the bend of the Adige River is from this period.

Thanks to Julius Caesar, in 49 B.C., Verona became a Roman city (like the rest of Transpadane Gaul) and, thanks to the Lex Roscia, it was granted the status of municipium and a countryside of up to 3,700 km² (today the province of Verona has a territory of 3,121 km²). The municipium could then boast the name Res publica Veronensium.

During the republican period Verona was rarely directly involved in the bloody period of the civil wars (49-31 B.C.); this helped its development and its economy, which went on to strengthen mainly in the cultivation of vines and olives, horse breeding (which originated from the Venetian tradition) and sheep breeding, as well as wool production. Handicrafts and trade also had a strong development. During this period the city, now moved to the bend of the Adige River, began to enlarge and modernize. Two new bridges were also built in place of the ford: the Pietra bridge and the Postumio bridge, over which the road of the same name passed.

=== The imperial era ===
Regio X Venetia et Histria, in which Verona was included.

Under the Augustan Empire, the city became an even more important strategic hub, as it was used as a temporary base for the legions, particularly after the conquest of Raetia and Vindelicia (15 BC). It was precisely the increased importance of the Adige Valley as a link with northern Europe, and by virtue of Verona's strategic importance, that allowed the construction of the Via Claudia Augusta, which led from Ostiglia (where another road from Rome arrived) to the Brenner Pass and thus into present-day Austria. Augustus provided for the territorial rearrangement of the peninsula by subdividing it into eleven regiones; Verona was then incorporated into the Regio X Venetia et Histria, which included the populations of the Cenomani Gauls, Rhaetians, Euganei, Veneti, Carni and Histri.

During this period Verona experienced a considerable influx of wealth, which led to further development of the city: baths and a Roman theater were erected at the foot of St. Peter's Hill. During the rule of Emperor Claudius, the Via Claudia Augusta and the Via Gallica (which came from Mediolanum and led into the Via Postumia and the Vicus Veronensium) were also built, and other roads were redeveloped.

With the coming to power of the Flavian dynasty, the long period of peace was interrupted for the city, particularly because of the war between Vitellius and Vespasian: the latter chose the city as a fortress, because it was surrounded by open fields in which he could deploy his cavalry; moreover, being a rich and important colony, its conquest was used for propaganda purposes. However, since the city was now growing outside the Republican city wall, a rampart was built south to the city, resulting in the excavation of the Adigetto, a long moat used for defensive purposes even in the Middle Ages. Verona was also a strategic location for Vespasian since he could have blocked Vitellius' descent into Italy from there. Fortunately for the city, a mutiny by one of Vitellius' legions pushed the war far away. It was under Emperor Vespasian, however, that the city reached the height of its wealth and splendor: the last great work of the first century was the Arena, built because the city, now with more than 25,000 inhabitants, needed a great building to cheer and distract its people.

=== The beginning of the barbarian invasions ===
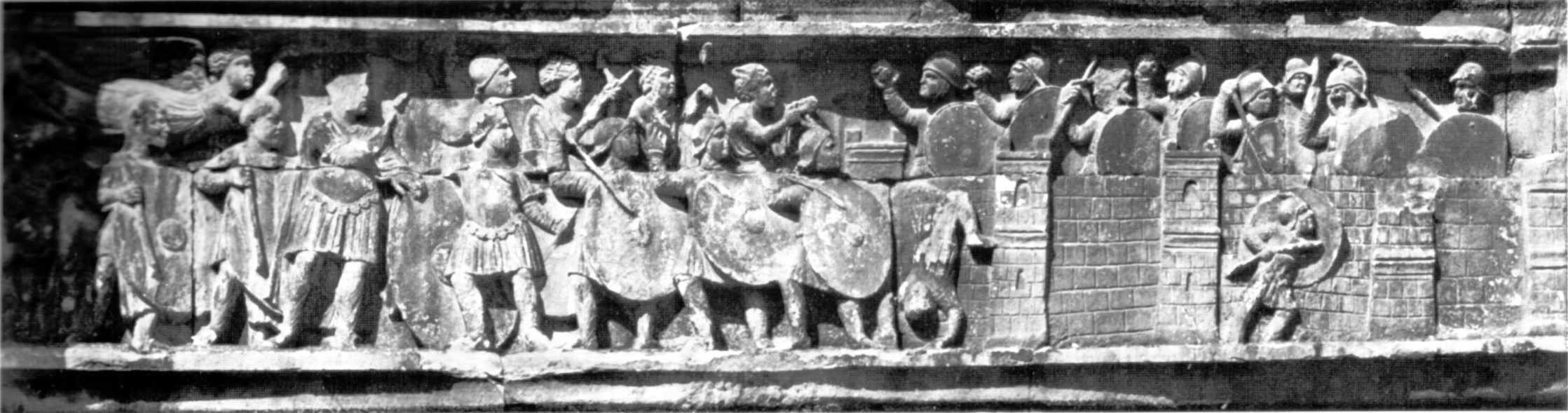
Depiction of the battle of Verona in the frieze on the south side of the Arch of Constantine in Rome

Beginning in the second century, Verona, like most cities in northern Italy, lost its function as a center of first importance, but became the scene of Roman civil wars: the city was affected by the wars involving Emperor Philip the Arab and Decius in 249, Carinus and Julian of Pannonia in 283, and Constantine I and Ruricius Pompeianus, with the battle of 312. Verona was then exposed to barbarian invasions and was Italy's first bulwark against attacks from northern Europe, such as during the Marcomannic Wars at the end of the second century, when a horde of Marcomanni and Quadi, who had recently besieged the city of Aquileia, were expelled by the imperial troops of Emperor Marcus Aurelius, who was advancing near the city.

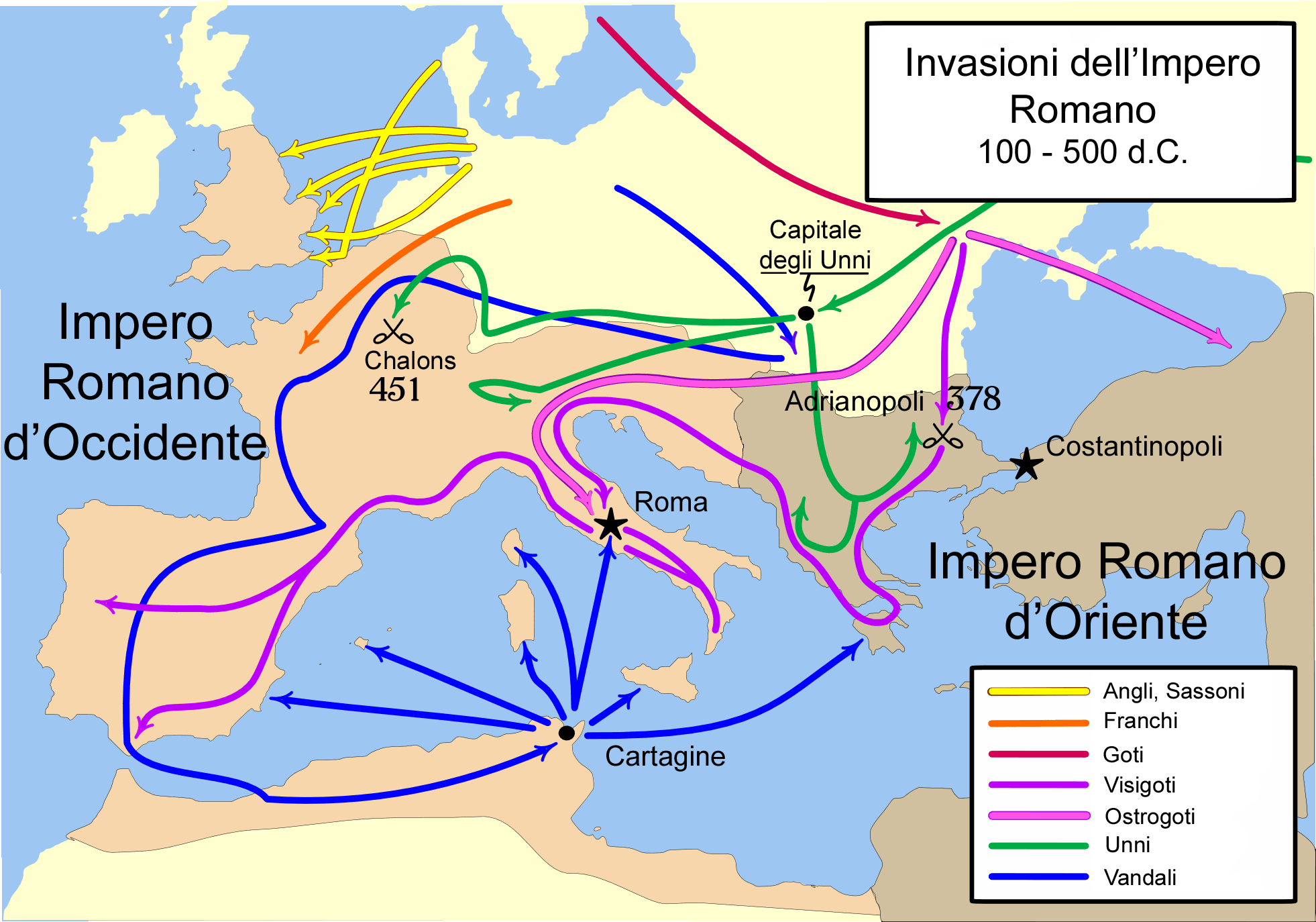
The invasions of the Roman Empire

Emperor Gallienus, in 265, had the city walls enlarged to include the Arena, fortifying it in only seven months, from April to December of that year, as is attested by the inscription on the architrave of Porta Borsari: this decision was made after the Alemanni had pushed as far as Ravenna. With Gallienus, a period of tranquility began for the city, but ensuring its security meant burdens and taxes on the citizens that made it less prosperous. Under Claudius Gothicus, the walls served as a deterrent against the siege of the city by the Alemanni, who, having reentered Italy, decided to abandon it.

Verona was slow to convert to Christianity, and at times sided with the early heresies. It was only with the bishop St. Zeno that Christian orthodoxy (according to the provisions of the Councils of Nicaea, Chalcedon and Ephesus) took hold. The 4th century was a relatively quiet period for the city, and it was not until the 5th century that new battles took place: already in 401 the Goths invaded Venice, and in 402 their defeated king Alaric I locked himself inside the city walls, but the following year they were defeated again at the Battle of Verona. Invasions were frequent during this period: in 452, the Hun king Attila invaded Italy, leaving a trail of destruction with half a million men that ended in Verona: there he was met by a delegation of the Roman Senate, composed of Pope Leo I, the consul Gennadius Avienus and the prefect Trygetius, who persuaded the Hun king to retreat to Pannonia.

== Verona in the early Middle Ages ==
=== Verona as the capital of the Goths ===
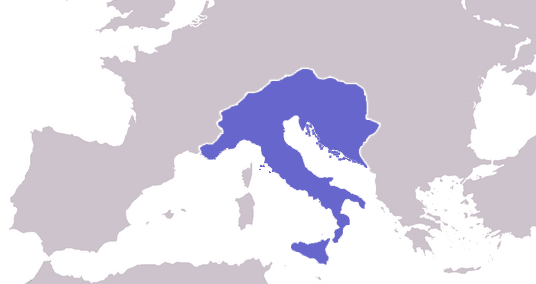
The Ostrogothic Kingdom a few years after the fall of the Western Roman Empire.

Odoacer, leader of the Heruli and Turcilingi, peoples who were part of the imperial army, deposed Romulus Augustulus and ended the Western Roman Empire in 476. Odoacer had no investiture but ruled de facto and left a good memory among the Veronese: he changed nothing from the previous government and as an Arian he did not oppose the Latin Christians of the Nicene-Ephesian creed; he also applied a Roman rule from the past to pacify his army, confiscating one-third of the land from the landowners and redistributing it to his soldiers; he revived agriculture and the economy, making life easier for the peasants by providing tax relief and freeing the slaves, who became serfs, formally free, though still bound to masters. Verona remained a city of primary military importance even under his rule. However, although Odoacer was able to stop the Rugii, he could do nothing against the Ostrogoths of Theodoric the Great, sent to Italy by Zeno, emperor of the East. In 488 more than 300,000 Ostrogoths set out for Italy, and Theodoric succeeded in defeating Odoacer precisely at the Battle of Verona, which took place on 30 September in the campus minor Veronensis, an area today corresponding to the territory of San Martino Buon Albergo; Odoacer was forced to flee and take refuge in Ravenna, where he capitulated after a siege that lasted no less than four years.

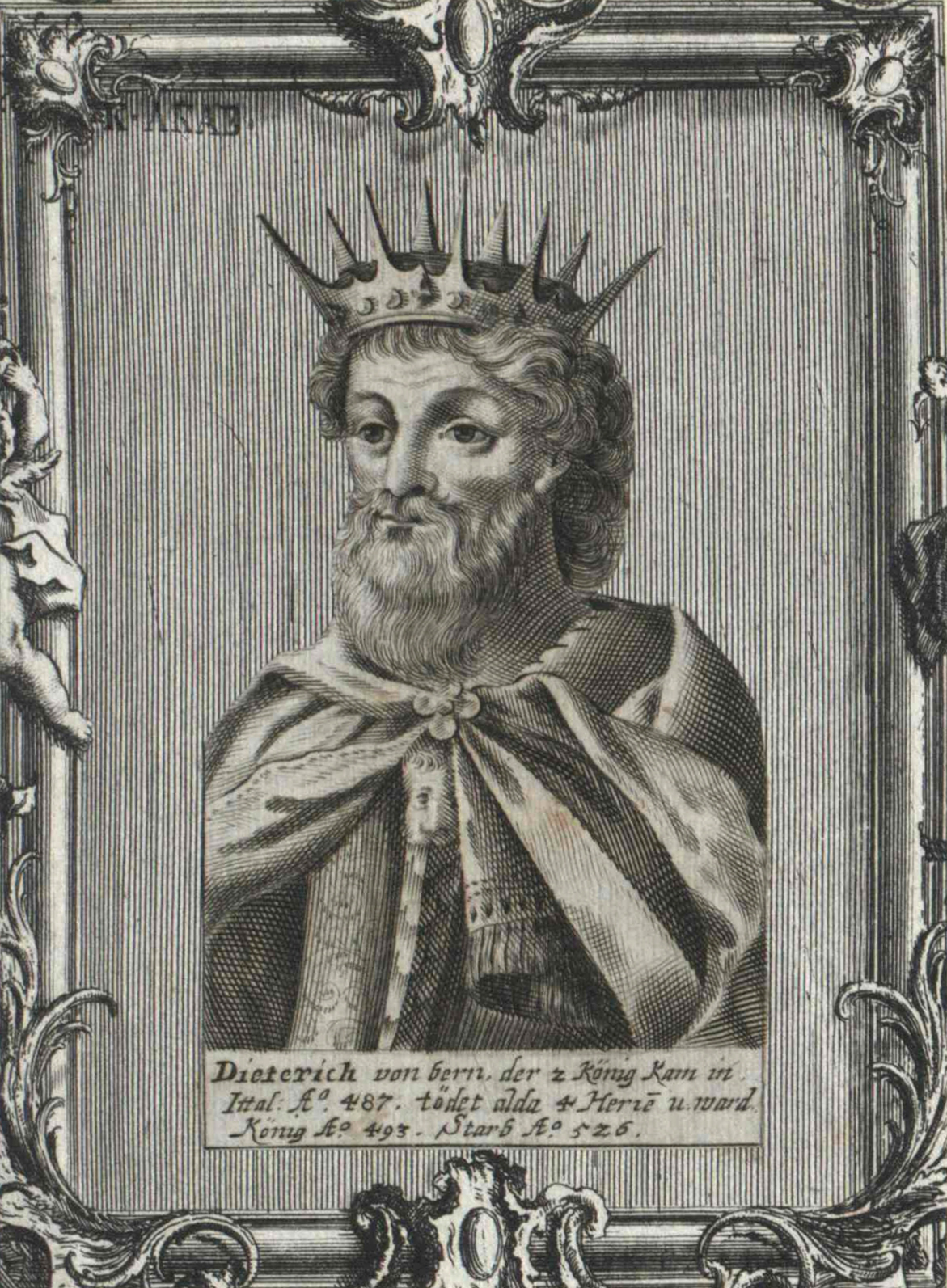
Depiction of Theodoric the Great

Theodoric's reign thus began in 493: the official capital became Ravenna, although Verona was the king's most important military center and favorite seat, so much so that in Germany he was known as Dietrich von Bern, i.e., Theodoric of Verona: he restored the city to its splendor and repaired and reinforced the walls damaged by previous barbarian incursions, as the city remained a strategic location for containing the Burgundians and Alemanni. Theodoric had many buildings restored, including the baths and the aqueduct, and had a palace named after him built near St. Peter's Hill: the Palace of Theodoric (no longer in existence).

In domestic politics he followed Odoacer's strategy but, in retaliation to persecution by Justin I toward the Arians in Byzantium, he harassed Romans who had become suspicious. In 535, after the death of Theodoric, Italy was invaded by the Byzantines; in the meantime Verona was commanded by Ildibad, who after the fall of Ravenna to Byzantine hands (540) was elected king by the Goth leaders. Upon the king's death the crown passed to his nephew Totila, an excellent politician and commander: wishing to eliminate the Byzantines from Italian soil, he followed Theodoric's policy, expropriating landed estates and accepting slaves into his army.

The Byzantines, with about 12,000 men attempted the attack on Verona, managing to get about 100 soldiers inside the city walls at night. The Goths, surprised, fled to the hills north of the city, but realizing the low number of soldiers who had penetrated, and the discord among the generals over the division of spoils, they attacked them, forcing them to flee and retreat across the Po River.

Totila was succeeded by King Teia, who ruled at a time when, by then, the ancient Roman buildings and roads were beginning to fall into ruin: upon his death Verona resisted for some time the Byzantine army commanded by Narses, aided in the resistance also by the Franks who had invaded the Venices in the course of the conflict; Procopius relates that when General Valerian, after Totila's defeat, attempted in 552 to besiege Verona, the garrison, desperate to resist and about to surrender, was saved by the intervention of the Frankish army, which was in the neighboring territories.

Map depicting the main moments of the Gothic War

The Gothic War officially ended in 555 with the surrender of Conza in Campania, but in the Venices and Transpadane Italy there were still Franks to drive out, as well as the last remnants of the Ostrogothic army still refusing to surrender; among the pockets of resistance still in the hands of the Ostrogoths was Verona, which, along with Brescia, continued to resist. In 556 operations began to reconquer these territories still outside imperial control, and by 559 Milan and much of the Venices were in Byzantine hands. However, Verona and Brescia still resisted. Around 561 Narses, faced with the refusal of the commander of the Frankish army in northern Italy, Amingus, to grant the Imperials permission to cross the Adige River, marched against the Franks, who in the meantime had allied themselves with a rebel Goth general named Widin (whom scholars have assumed was the commander of the garrison in Verona); Narses defeated both of them in battle, resulting in the expulsion of the Franks from Italy and, at about the same time (561-562), the surrender of the last pockets of Goth resistance, namely Verona and Brescia, whose keys were sent to Constantinople; Verona fell on 20 July 561, and Brescia in the same year or at the latest in 562, while news of the surrender of the two cities reached Constantinople in November 562. According to some scholars, Verona and Brescia fell to Byzantine hands only in 561/562; while others, believing it unlikely that the city resisted for so long after the "official" end of the conflict (555), believe it more likely that the city was already in Byzantine hands and that in 561/562 it revolted together with Brescia, forcing Narses to intervene.

=== The Lombards ===
Lombard dominions after the death of Alboin, around 575

Alboin, king of the Lombards, interrupted the brief Byzantine rule over Verona. In 568 he broke into Italy via Cividale, from which he set out to conquer the land that would later be known as Langobardia Major: Verona was undefended and was occupied without bloodshed. The city became the capital of Italy until 571, when the seat of the Lombard court was moved to Pavia. Verona's territory was nevertheless elevated to a duchy: the only known dukes of Verona are Autari (the first), Giselberto, Zangrulfo and Lupone. During Lombard rule it thus remained among the main cities of Langobardia Major, alongside Milan, Cividale and the capital Pavia. Alboin was killed by his wife Rosamund in Theodoric's palace in Verona, where he still rests today.

Also in Verona, in 774, the Frankish king Charlemagne came to lead the last resistance of the Lombards, led by Desiderius's son Adalgis; the prince sought refuge within the city before being forced to flee, marking the end of the Lombard kingdom. Manzoni transposed this historical fact into his tragedy of the same name, however, shifting the emphasis to the personal drama of Ermengarda, Desiderius's daughter repudiated and abandoned by Charlemagne.

=== Carolingian empire and the last invasions ===
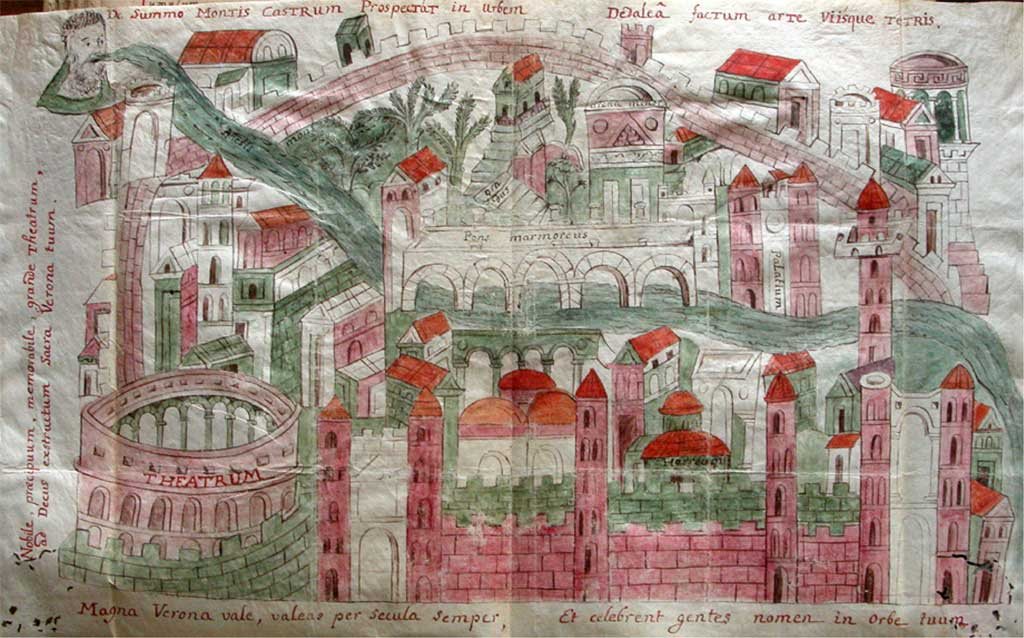
The so-called “Raterian iconography,” in a codex of Bishop Ratherius from the mid-10th century, the oldest depiction of Verona

With the coronation of Charlemagne in 800, the fall of the Lombard kingdom coincided with the birth of the Carolingian Empire. Following the revolt of Hrodgaud in 776, the Lombard dukes were replaced by Frankish officials, the counts, and Verona became the capital of a county. In 781 Charlemagne assigned the Lombard part of the Empire, including Verona, to his son Pepin. During Pepin's reign many churches were renovated and new ones were built, such as the basilica of San Zeno, erected on the remains of a primitive early Christian building that had been erected near the saint's tomb. Pepin also had the city walls rebuilt because of the danger of new invasions by the Avars. Pepin often stayed in Verona at Theodoric's palace and St. Peter's Hill, so that when he died in 810 he was buried in the city. His father died four years later but the Carolingian dynasty continued to rule the territory until the deposition of Charles the Fat in 887. The Kingdom of Italy then became formally independent, but as the pretenders to the throne fought among themselves, the Hungarians plundered northern Italy, including the suburbs of Verona.

The March of Verona and the other ancient Italian states in the year 1000

When Berengar I became king of Italy, he set up his capital at Verona, where he had Bishop Adalardo and Marquis Walfredo as advisers. To keep the crown, Berengar had to wage numerous wars, also suffering bitter defeats, until he met his death, in Verona, at the hands of Milo of Sambonifacio, one of his relatives. He was succeeded by several kings of Italy, and Berengar II in particular established the March of Verona. One of the first documents in Vulgar Latin, containing traces of Italian vernacular, dates from this period: the Veronese Riddle.

In 951 the March ended up in the hands of the Duke of Bavaria, only to be subjugated to the Duchy of Carinthia. Berengar II tried to regain it, but at the descent of Otto I lost it again. Milo of Sambonifacio, already count of Verona, became marquis.

Following the union of the crowns of Italy and Germany under the Holy Roman Empire, the city, an obligatory stopover for those on their way to the Brenner Pass, was often the destination of emperors who also stayed there for long periods, as well as the site of numerous diets. In 967 Emperor Otto II arrived in Verona to prepare for war against the Saracens, but after a heavy defeat in Calabria he had to take shelter in the city again, where in 983 he called a diet attended by leading figures from the Kingdom of Italy and the Roman territory, as well as the bishops and princes of Franconia, Saxony, Swabia and Lorraine. Upon the death of Otto II, his son Otto III was crowned emperor, but he died as early as 1002: the funeral procession passed through Verona, crossing Italy.

== Verona in the Late Middle Ages ==
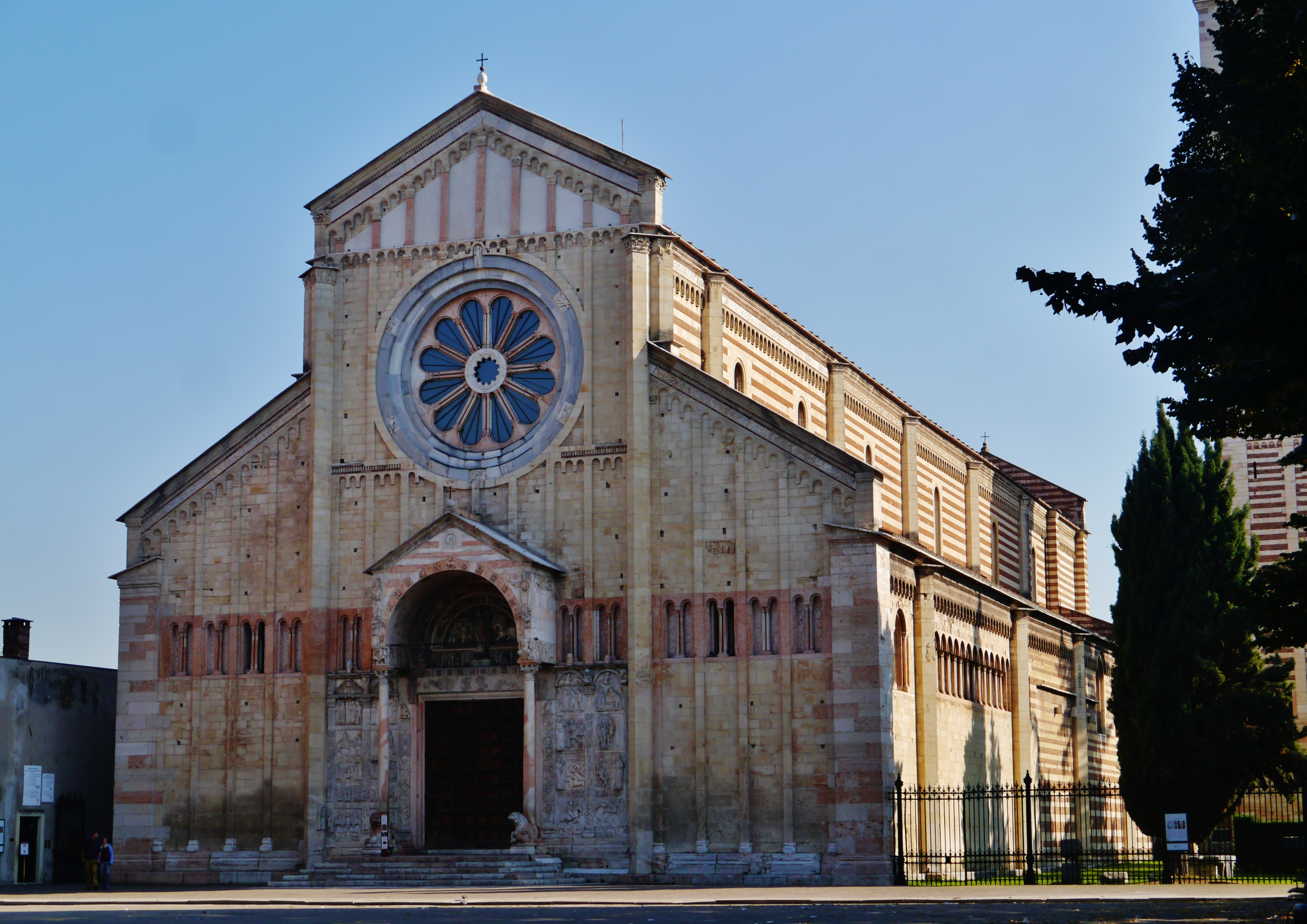
Basilica of San Zeno, a masterpiece of Romanesque architecture. It was built on an earlier building severely damaged in the devastating earthquake of 3 January 1117.

Upon the death of Otto III in 1002 a number of feudal lords gathered in Pavia, where they elected Arduin of Ivrea king of Italy, who waged war against the bishop of Verona Otbertus: the bishop was defeated in battle, and the same fate then befell the duke of Carinthia Otto, who ruled the March of Verona. Otbert fled to Germany to ask the emperor Henry II to come down to his aid: he entered Italy through a secondary pass, thus catching by surprise the enemy army, which fled; Henry II was thus able to enter Verona, where he was received by the Canossa family, and after a brief stop he set out for Pavia, where he was crowned. Henry II subsequently descended to Italy three more times (on the last, in 1021, he stopped in Verona, where he held a diet), and in 1024 he was succeeded by Conrad II.

In those years northern Italy was ravaged by numerous wars, so Conrad II, after spending Christmas in Verona, decided to put order there by attempting to pacify it. He died in 1039 and was succeeded by Henry III, who descended there a second time because of private problems with the Canossa family (who were aiming for power in Verona). In 1046 Pietro Cadalo (future antipope Honorius II) founded, just outside the walls, the abbey complex of San Giorgio in Braida, where a monastic community of Benedictines settled.

The city was also loyal to Emperor Henry IV, who was engaged in the long investiture war with the papacy, while several Lombard cities abandoned him. On 10 April 1090 he organized an army in the city composed mostly of Veronese, with which he attacked Nogara and besieged (successfully) Mantua, while in a second battle at Monteveglio Henry IV's son died, whom he had buried in the basilica of San Zeno. Incidentally, in the last years of the emperor's stay in Italy, the bishop of Verona was his chancellor. Henry IV then returned to Germany in 1097, but Verona persisted in its hostility to the papal reform. This led to a peculiar fact: Pope Paschal II was supposed to go to Germany by the fastest route, namely the Adige Valley, but he was "so badly received" by the Veronese that he was forced to change his route, thus passing through France.

Devastating for Verona was the earthquake of 3 January 1117, which brought down the outer ring of the Arena, as well as destroying numerous religious and civil buildings, but gave impetus to a period of intense rebuilding; a few years later (1122), however, the struggle over investiture ended, with the Concordat of Worms. According to historian Luigi Simeoni, the population of Verona in this century must have numbered about 10,000 and was divided into five districts, four of which (Maggiore, Chiavica, Ferro, and Capitani) corresponded to the ancient Roman regiones, while the fifth, known as "del Castello," had been established across the Adige River.

=== Communal Verona ===
Coat of arms of the Sambonifacio family, which played a prominent role in the political life of the city

In 1125 Henry V died and the Count of Verona Sambonifacio became marquis and duke of the city. In the meantime, Lothair was proclaimed king in Germany, while two factions that would later be called the Guelphs and the Ghibellines were emerging: Verona was particularly affected by the struggle between these two factions, partly because in the countryside there was a Guelph majority (with the most prominent being the Sambonifacio), while in the city there was predominantly a Ghibelline component (with numerous leading figures, such as the Montecchi, made famous by Shakespeare's play Romeo and Juliet).

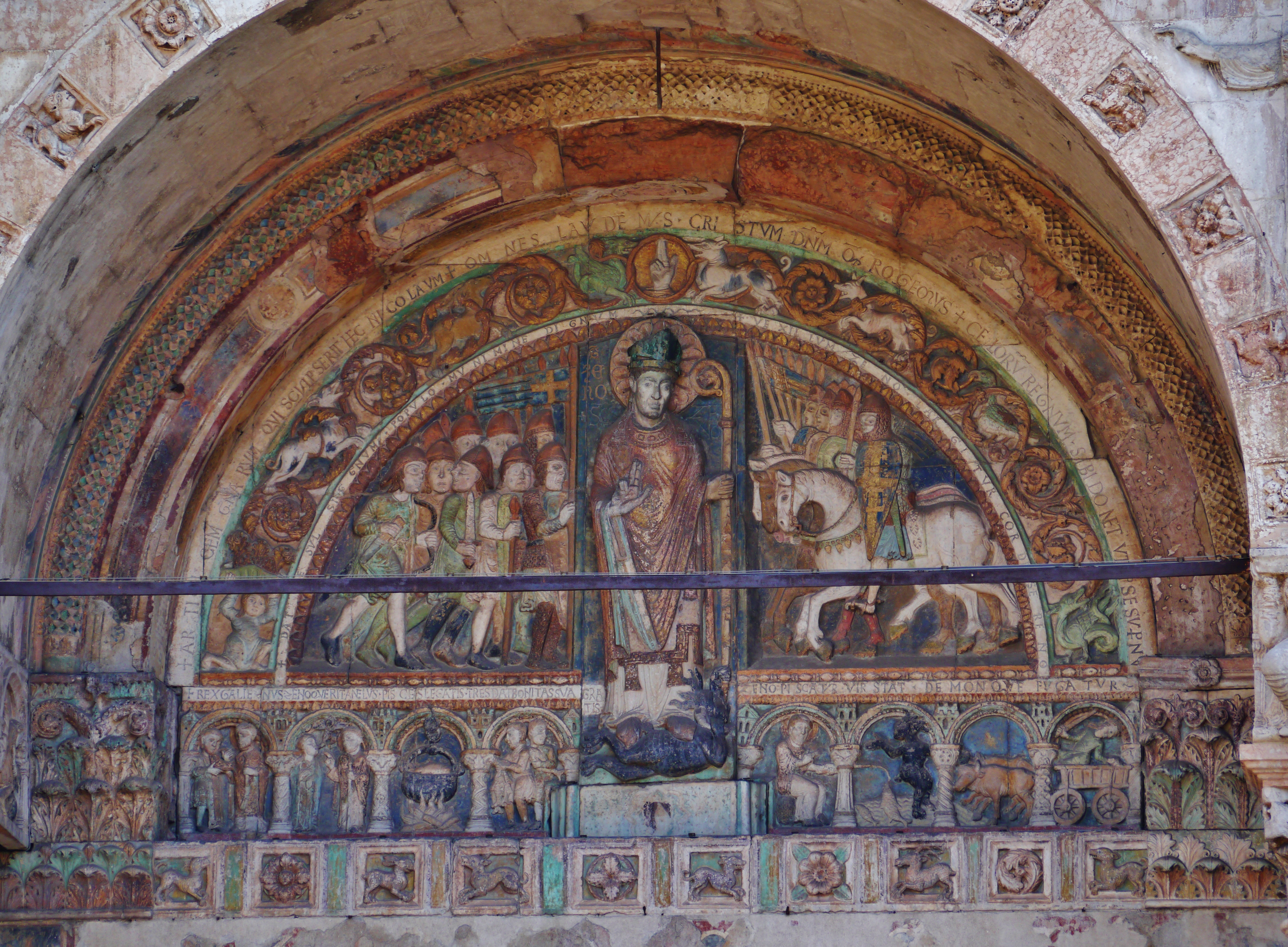
Depiction of the founding of the free commune of Verona, located in the lunette of the entrance portal to the basilica of San Zeno

The first consuls of the free commune, three to be exact, were elected only in 1136, and were later increased to six. The transition to this new type of institution, with the choice of St. Zeno as patron, is attested by a bas-relief on the lunette of the prothyrum of the basilica of San Zeno dating from 1138, where the saint appears in the center, as if symbolically sanctioning the pact between the milites (the feudal aristocracy, represented by the knights on the right) and the pedites (the wealthy townsmen, the rising bourgeoisie). In the transition phase from feudalism to commune, an oligarchy of a dozen families (including the Sambonifacio and the Ezzelini) was created, which sanctioned their power in the communal phase. In 1147, Balduino della Scala, one of the ancestors of the Scaliger family, who would later rule Verona for more than a hundred years, was also elected consul. With the birth of the Commune, struggles between the various families developed within the city, while the political struggle did not spread against neighboring cities: the clashes with Ferrara, Treviso, and Padua were in fact for economic reasons. In 1151 the consuls were replaced by the veronensium rector, and in 1169 the rector was replaced by the podestà.

==== Frederick Barbarossa and the Commune of Verona ====
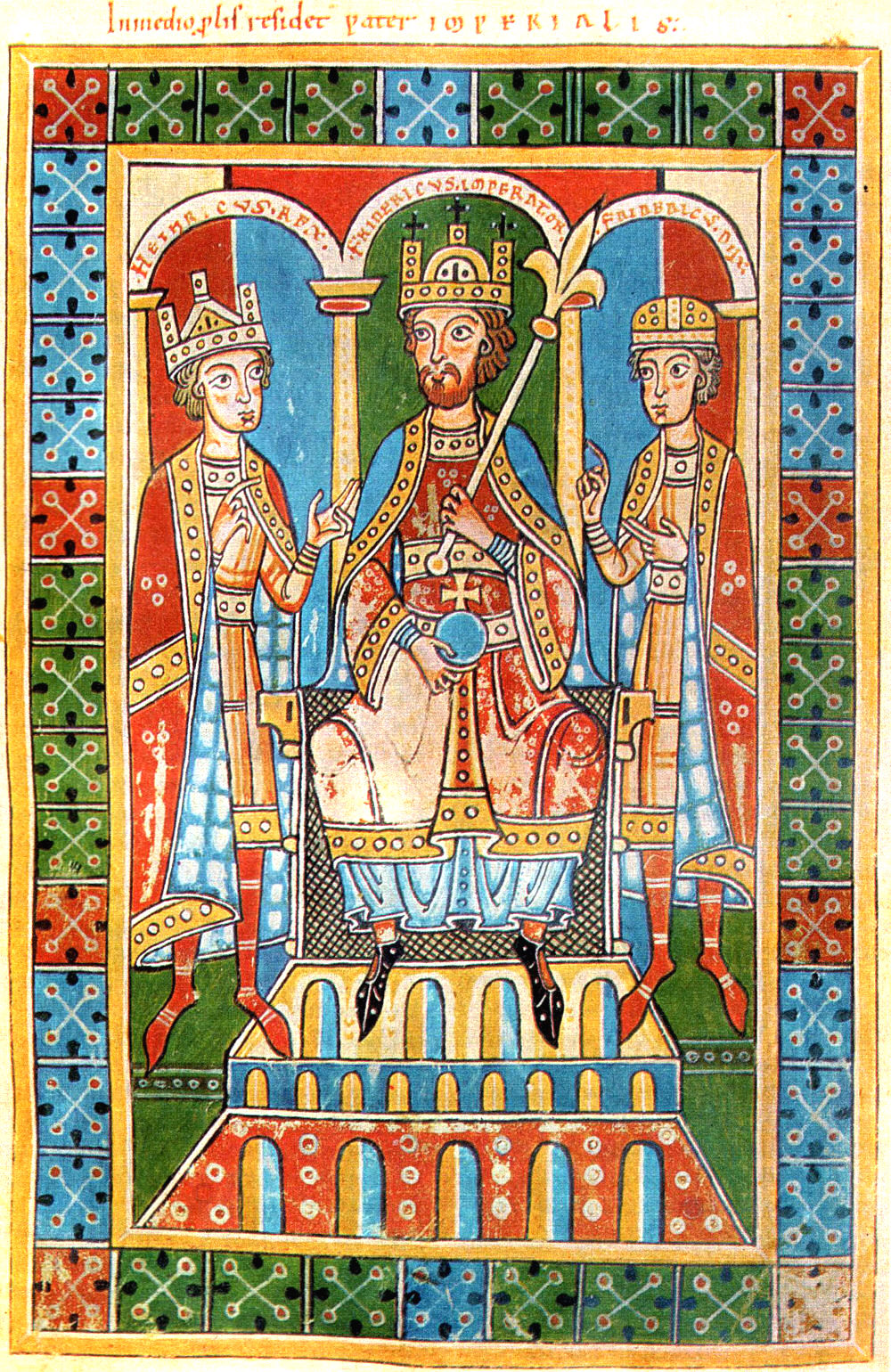
Miniature of Emperor Frederick I Barbarossa

On 4 March 1152, Frederick I Hohenstaufen, known as "Barbarossa," ascended the throne and descended to Italy in 1154 to march on Milan. In his policy of subjugating the communes of the peninsula (which had usurped some imperial powers), he destroyed castles, towns and entire cities (such as Asti, Tortona and Spoleto) throughout Italy. However, his army was struck by a plague, so he was forced to return to Germany: he had to pass through Verona, where he had a pontoon bridge built to cross the Adige River just outside the city walls. As the army was crossing the bridge, it was destroyed by some logs freed by Veronese, so Barbarossa, enraged, out of spite had the noses of the Veronese present in his troops cut off, even though they were innocent. On his way back to Germany he found a new obstacle at Rivoli Veronese, the place where the Adige valley begins: a few hundred men fought Barbarossa, but were defeated and thus killed or mutilated. Barbarossa held the City of Verona responsible for the inconveniences, so he forced it to promise him military aid in case he waged war against Milan.

In 1157 Barbarossa prepared a new descent: he immediately occupied Brescia after which he advanced toward the Adda, encountering and defeating the Milanese army. At this point he requested the help of the Italian cities, including Verona to whom he reminded of his obligation, and thus managed to raise an army of 100,000 infantrymen and 10,000 cavalrymen with which he besieged Milan. which was forced to surrender after a month. In 1163 he descended again into Italy and held a diet in Lodi where he stipulated that the fleets of Genoa and Pisa should be placed at his disposal in the event of an attack on Sicily, but in the meantime an anti-imperial league was formed consisting of Verona, Venice, Padua, Vicenza and Ferrara: the Veronese League, or more precisely the Veronensis societas. Barbarossa arrived at the gates of Verona, stopping in the vicinity of Vigasio, where he waited for some conspirators within the city to open the gates, but in the meantime the army of the Veronese League arrived in the vicinity of the German camp, so Barbarossa decided to retreat to Germany.

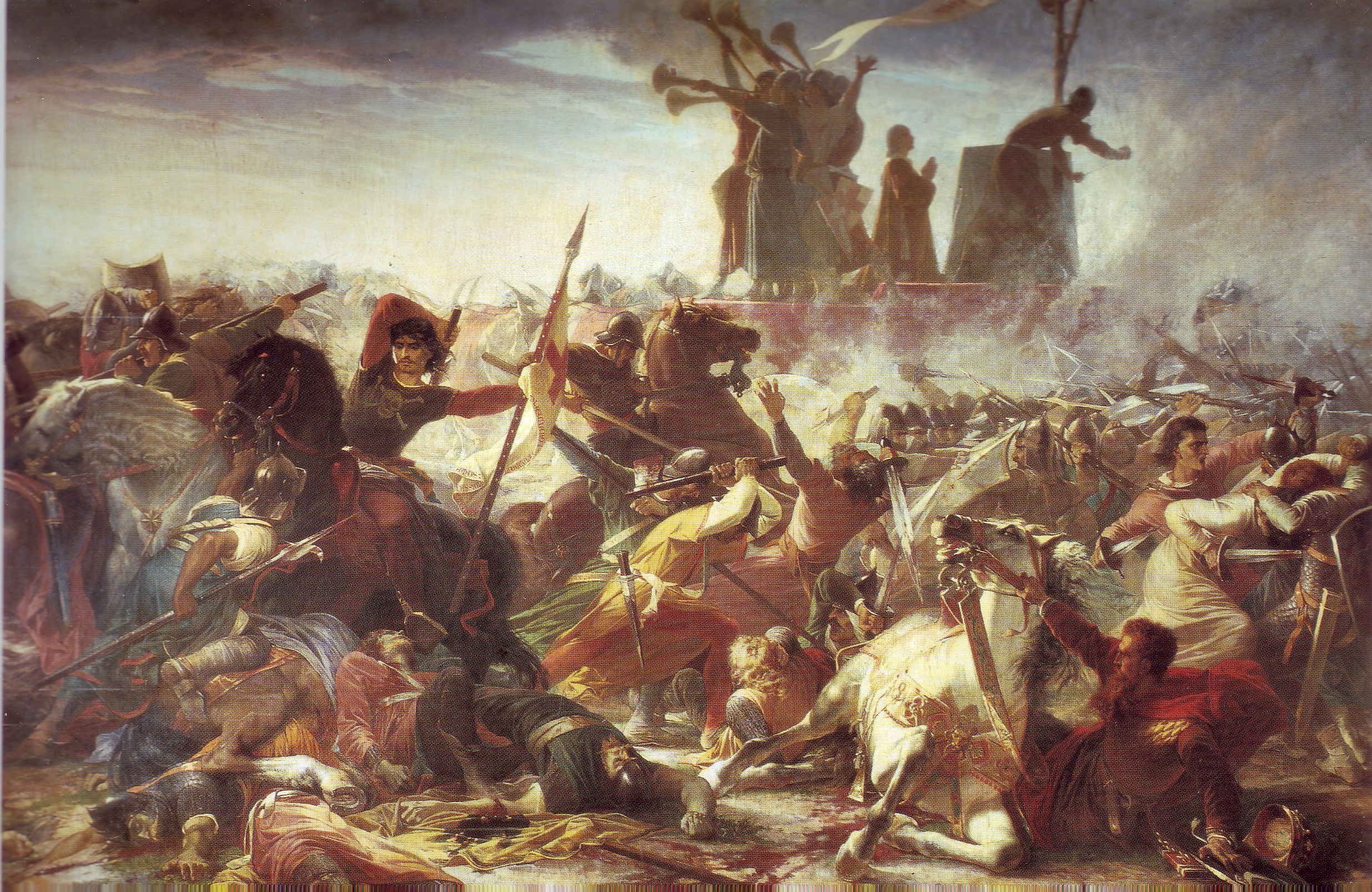
Amos Cassioli's depiction of the Battle of Legnano, in which three hundred Veronese knights participated.

When Pope Alexander III returned to Rome, Barbarossa decided to intervene again, for fear that the pope would ally with the Communes: however, the Veronese managed to stop him at the Lock of Rivoli Veronese, so the emperor was forced to deviate and pass through Valcamonica, but in the meantime Cremona, Mantua, Brescia and Bergamo allied, while the following month the Lombard League was formed, consisting of Milan, Ferrara, Lodi, Parma and Piacenza. In 1167 the two leagues (Veronese and Lombard) united to form the so-called Concordia: Bergamo, Bologna, Brescia, Cremona, Ferrara, Lodi, Mantua, Milan, Modena, Novara, Padua, Piacenza, Reggio Emilia, Treviso, Venice, Vercelli, Verona and Vicenza participated in this alliance. Barbarossa in the meantime had entered Rome where he was again crowned; shortly afterward, however, his army was struck by a plague and was therefore forced to retreat. Frederick, on his fifth descent into Italy, attempted an attack on the cities of the Lombard League: 12,000 soldiers, among whom were three hundred Veronese knights, won the battle of Legnano against approximately 4,000 of the emperor's men, while the Veronese and Brescian infantry were in defense of Milan. The defeated emperor after lengthy negotiations recognized the communal autonomies (Peace of Constance, 1183). On this occasion, the Carroccio of Verona was made, a chariot richly adorned with the symbols of the city that was carried in procession on major festivals and carefully guarded in the basilica of San Zeno until 1583, when some ministers of the abbey misappropriated and destroyed it.

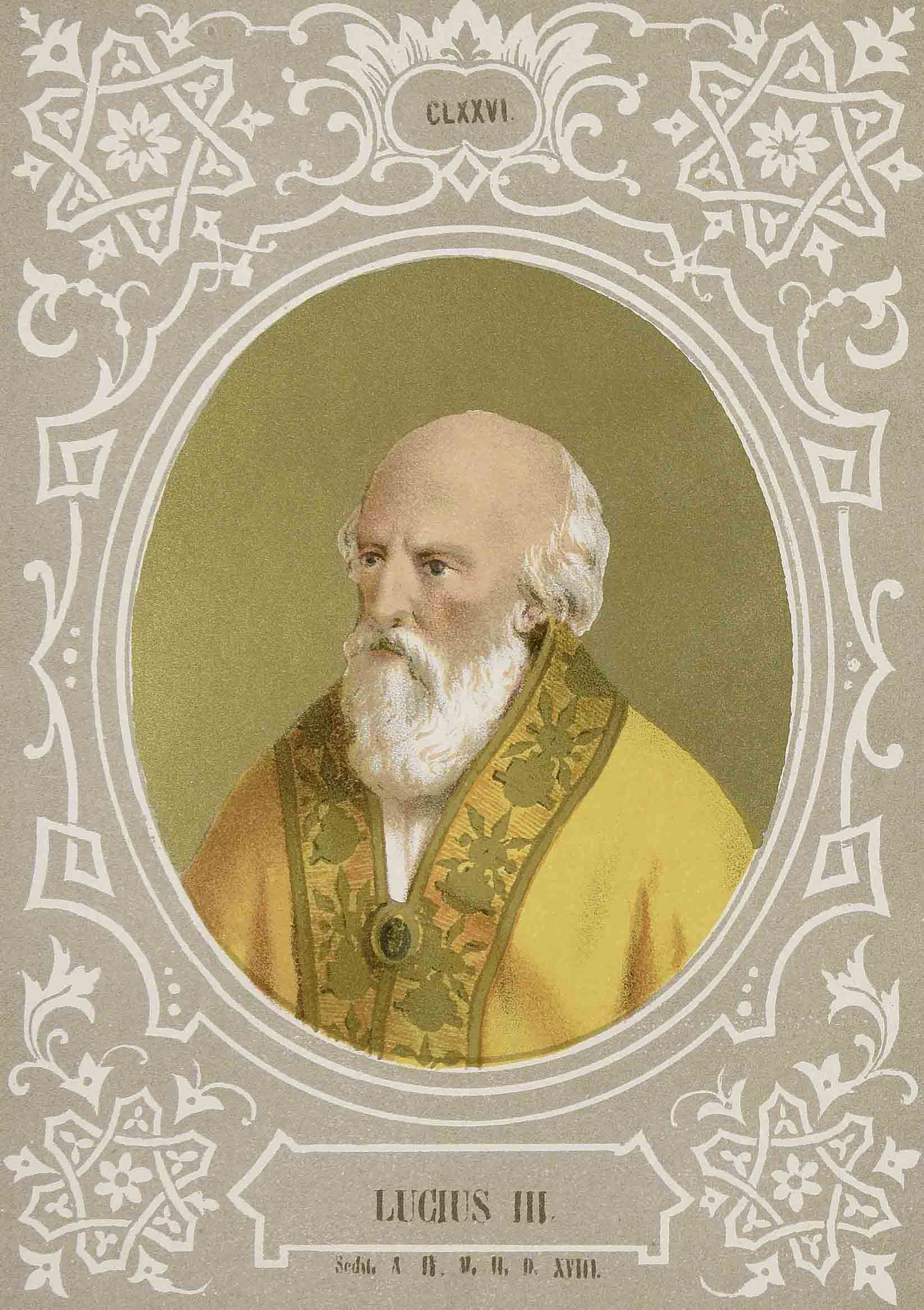
Nineteenth-century depiction of Pope Lucius III, who found refuge in Verona in the last years of his life

In March 1182 uprisings broke out in Rome against the new pope Lucius III, who sought and found refuge in Verona, where he was housed at the bishopric. In 1184, the Emperor Barbarossa made his sixth and last visit to Italy and, in order to endear himself to the cities of the March of Verona, granted them numerous privileges. Meanwhile, the Council of Verona was held in the city, attended by the emperor who was staying at the abbey of San Zeno, at which Cathars, Patarines, Waldensians and Arnoldists were condemned. In 1185 Lucius III died and was buried in Verona Cathedral, where he still rests today. He was succeeded by Urban III, who was crowned in the city, more precisely in Castel San Pietro, in the presence of the emperor. During his stay, he also tried to reconcile the Montecchi and the Sambonifacio.

In 1188 Verona began a conflict with Ferrara, mainly over economic issues and in particular the river trade on the Po: on this occasion it managed to conquer some villages in the Polesine, the first territorial expansion of the Commune. Also in this period some soldiers from Verona participated in the Crusades, in particular in the third one in which Barbarossa died, and it is said that they took part in the attack on Acco. Meanwhile, the war with Ferrara continued, with Verona allying itself with Mantua and succeeding in capturing the eastern shore of Lake Garda and the Rivoli Veronese lock. The conflict ended in 1198, but soon Mantua waged war against its former Veronese allies: after a Veronese victory, two alliances were formed, one consisting of Verona, Ferrara, Treviso and Vicenza, and the other of Mantua, Padua and Ravenna. Meanwhile, in 1201, Frederick II, nephew of Barbarossa, was crowned in Palermo, which later proved to be important for the city's affairs.

==== The Ezzelini and the escalation of struggles between Guelphs and Ghibellines ====
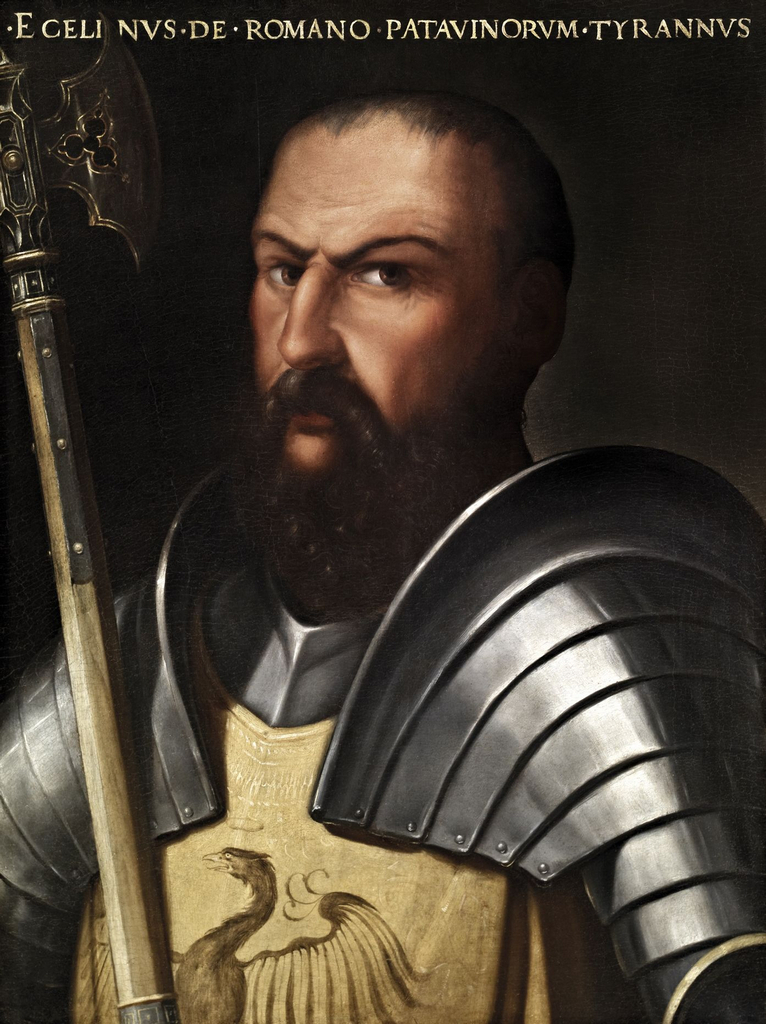
Sixteenth-century portrait of Ezzelino III da Romano by Cristofano dell'Altissimo

Beginning in 1200 the Ezzelini family took more power, at first with Ezzelino II da Romano, who became podestà, and later with his son Ezzelino III da Romano. In 1206 the podestà of Verona, Azzano d'Este, tried unsuccessfully to eliminate the Montecchi and Sambonifacio families from the city; he thus allied himself with the Guelphs of the Veronese countryside, to whom he let them invade the city and destroy the palaces of the Ghibelline families, but some of them managed to escape with the help of Ezzelino II. The latter then gathered an army at Bassano and headed for Verona: in turn Azzano gathered soldiers, but lost the battle and was forced to flee, while the Ghibelline Oderico Visconti was elected podestà in the city. To celebrate the important victory, the "feast of the people" was organized, from which originated the race of the palio of Verona, also mentioned by Dante in the Divine Comedy (Inferno XV, 122).

In 1223 Ezzelino III married Giglia di Sambonifacio, while his sister Cunizza da Romano married Rizzardo di Sambonifacio, tying the two important families together. In the same year, however, the father left Ezzelino III power over Verona, and at this point discord with the Sambonifacio became an open fight, so much so that he advanced with an army toward the city, causing the Guelphs to flee after a brief resistance. In response, many Guelph leaders gathered at Villafranca to re-establish the Lombard League, but little was accomplished; in the meantime, Ezzelino III had the first Veronese statute written (the original is in the Chapter Library of Verona), which was to be enforced by the podestà.

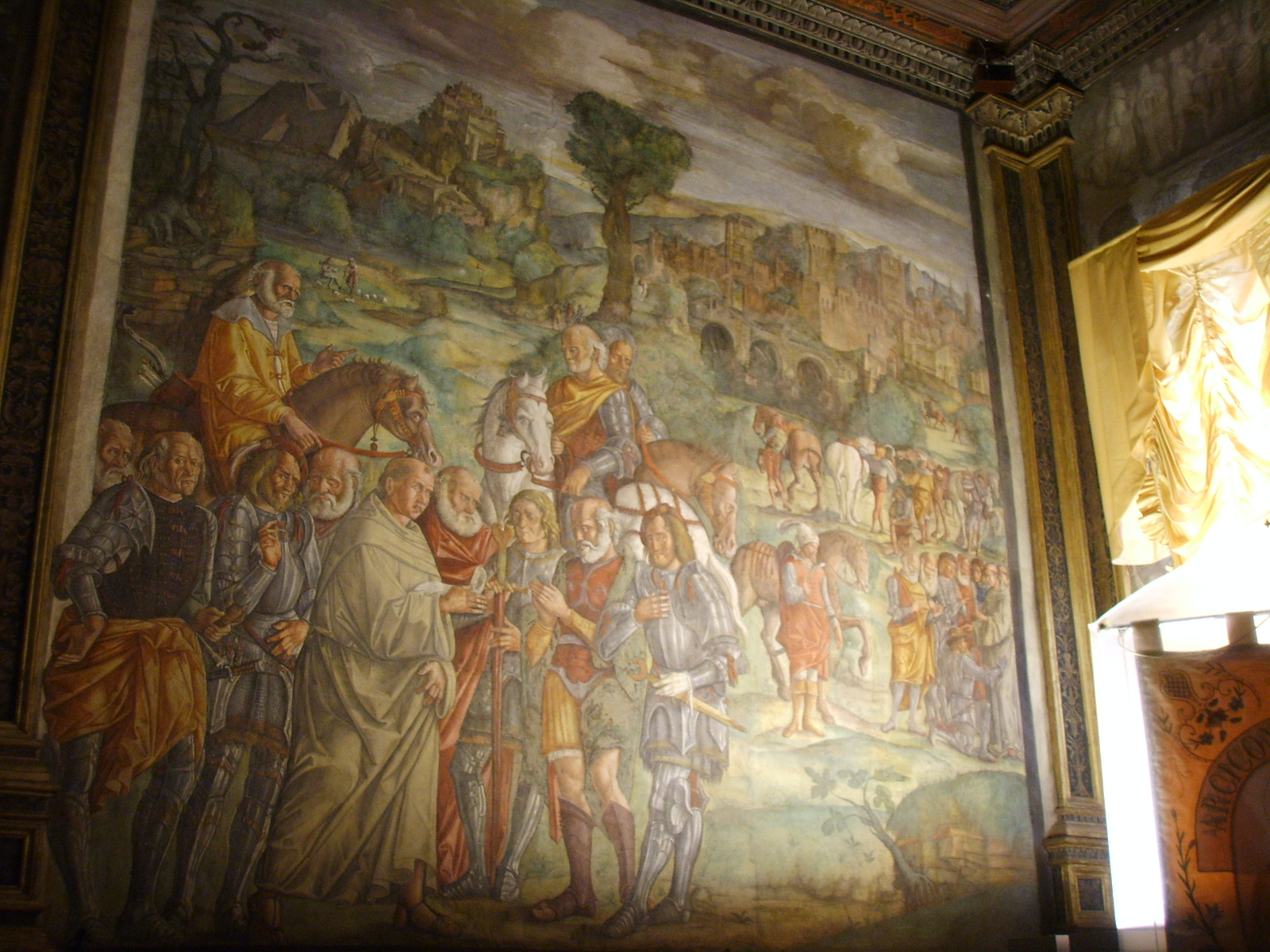
Fresco depicting St. Anthony of Padua facing Ezzelino III da Romano in Verona

At first the Ezzelinian regency was peaceful, but, after persistent rumors of a Guelph conspiracy, he had several Guelph leaders of the city imprisoned, and even St. Anthony of Padua begged him to release the Sambonifacio. The Paduans began to carry out raids in the east of Verona, so Ezzelino III sought help from Emperor Frederick II, who gave him the important title of imperial vicar in Italy: the podestà was then able to initiate a large number of battles and sackings of Guelph towns and castles, which tried hard to stand up to him. The pact between Ezzelino III da Romano and Frederick II was sanctioned by the marriage between the Veronese despot and Selvaggia, Frederick II's daughter, celebrated in the basilica of San Zeno with the emperor and his minister, the notary Pier della Vigna, who stayed in the abbey.

Friar Giovanni da Schio tried to pacify the northern cities through his remarkable eloquence, starting in Bologna and then moving to Padua and several other cities, becoming famous in a short time. The last destination of his journey was Verona: with thousands of faithful and soldiers he arrived at the gates of the city, where he proposed a “treaty of universal pacification.” Ezzelino III then stood aside, envisioning that discord would soon begin; and in fact Friar Giovanni di Schio was soon given unlimited powers both in Verona and Vicenza, where arrests multiplied. In the city he began to hunt down heretics or alleged heretics, burning more than 60 men and women at the stake in a few days. It was then that Vicenza rebelled: Friar Giovanni set out with an army but was defeated, while in turn Verona rebelled, forcing him to take refuge in Bologna. Ezzelino III was then able to return to power in the city, and in 1239 he banned the leading members of the Guelph families of Verona. The Ghibellines (and in particular the Montecchi) were also unhappy with the situation, so Ezzelino reformed some laws: he enlarged the council by creating the "Council of the Five Hundred," formed by the leading figures of the Arts, and gave a council of fifteen elders the keys to the city.

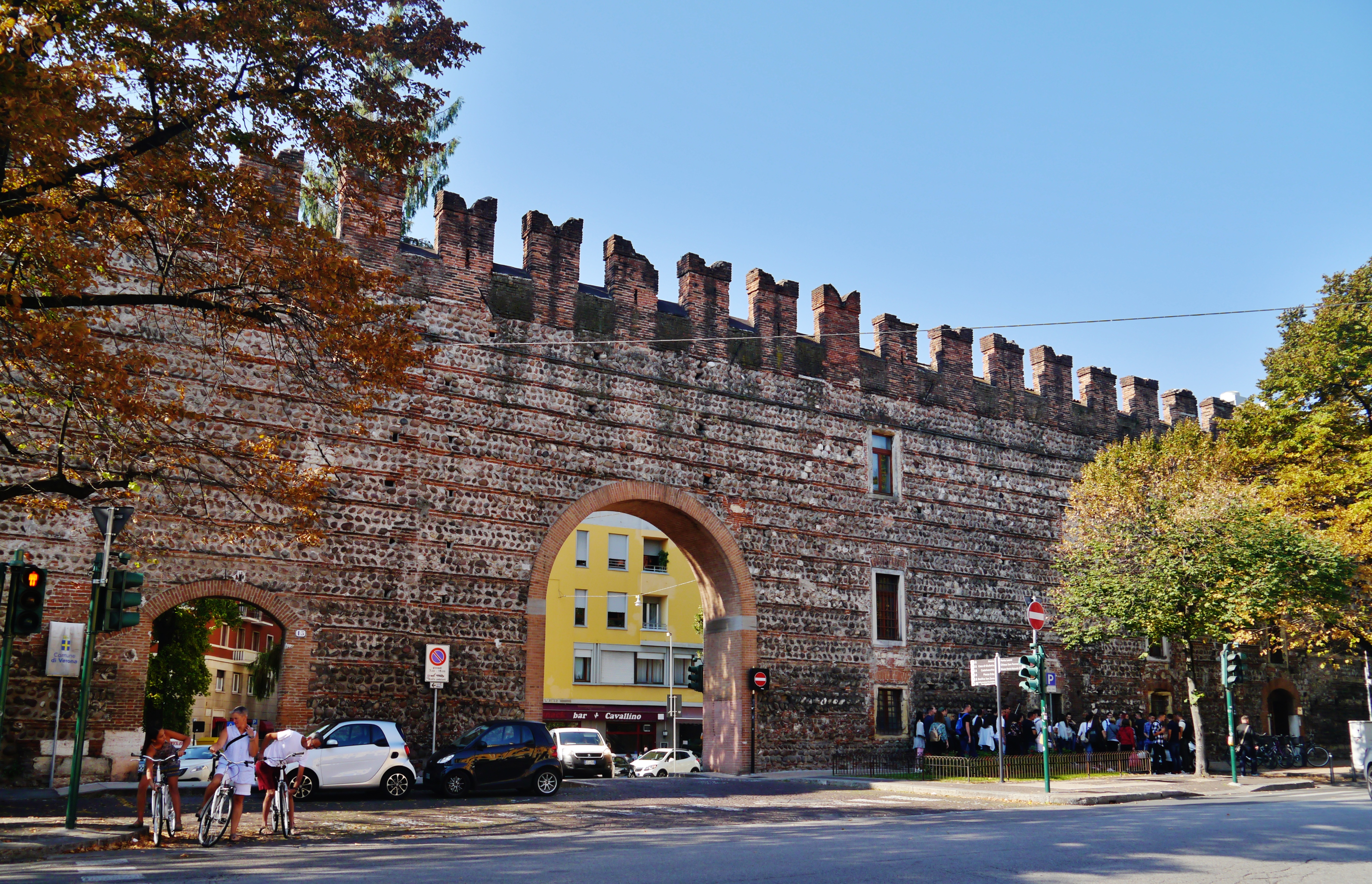
The municipal walls of Verona, which Ezzelino had rebuilt between 1240 and 1250.

Frederick II began to worry about Ezzelino's arrogance, so much so that in 1245 he held a diet in Verona: Ezzelino was repeatedly accused of heresy by the participating bishops, and at this point even the Veronese began to notice the concerns that plagued the emperor. Thus there were popular uprisings against the emperor, who was forced to leave without even concluding the diet. Furious, Ezzelino had numerous people arrested and tortured, while continuing his territorial expansion. At this point Pope Alexander IV promoted a crusade against him. When Ezzelino learned that Padua (his hometown) had voluntarily given itself to the papacy, he vented his rage on the people of Verona: the massacre of Verona, which began on 25 June 1256, saw for a full eight days the slaughter of numerous citizens, regardless of age, sex or status. Some were beheaded, others hanged, the most unfortunate burned at the stake or quartered, a massacre that was carried out by the still loyal Paduan troops.

On 29 September 1259 Ezzelino lost a battle on the Adda, was captured, and died shortly afterward. Upon his death Verona was the only city under his rule that did not end up in the hands of the Guelphs: in fact, the city's podestà, already since 1258, was the Ghibelline Mastino I della Scala.

Despite the constant wars, this was a fruitful period for letters: the Provençal troubadours, exiled from France following the papal crusade against the Albigensians, found a safe haven in the city, from which the culture of the minnesänger, the German troubadours, could propagate.

=== Della Scala lordship ===
The Scaliger family coat of arms, with a white ladder, with four or five rungs, on a red field

In Verona, the Ghibelline faction had by then gained the upper hand, and with Mastino della Scala, the city passed from commune to lordship: in 1262 he was in fact appointed "perpetual general captain of the people." He immediately sought to alleviate the unrest and ordered aid to the villages devastated by the many battles that had taken place in those years. As early as 1263 the Guelphs attempted to assassinate him, but the plot was uncovered even before it could be carried out: the captured conspirators were condemned to death, while those who managed to escape were helped by the Sambonifacio. In 1265 Trento rebelled, being quickly reoccupied, while shortly afterwards the castles of Lonigo, Montecchio Maggiore and Montebello were captured.

Two years later Emperor Conradin of Swabia arrived in Italy, whom the Scaliger, loyal to the Swabian dynasty, supported militarily, even against the same Ghibellines as his rival Manfred of Swabia. The entire city of Verona was therefore excommunicated by the pontiff: the Guelphs took advantage of this and rose up in Mantua, where, however, the city fell into the hands of the Bonacolsi, allies of the Scaliger. That same year the excommunications were withdrawn, but at a very high price: Mastino was forced to have the 170 or so Cathar bishops and priests present captured in Sirmione and imprisoned. Mastino did not feel like killing them and in fact only after his death were they burned at the stake in the Arena.

With Mastino the city achieved a remarkable state of prosperity, but the Guelphs nevertheless attempted a conspiracy in 1277, in this case succeeding in killing Mastino and his family friend, Nogarola. The culprits who managed to escape were forbidden to return, while their houses were razed to the ground. He was succeeded by his brother Alberto, who, due to his popularity with the people, made the final transition from commune to lordship: in just ten days he was given extensive powers.

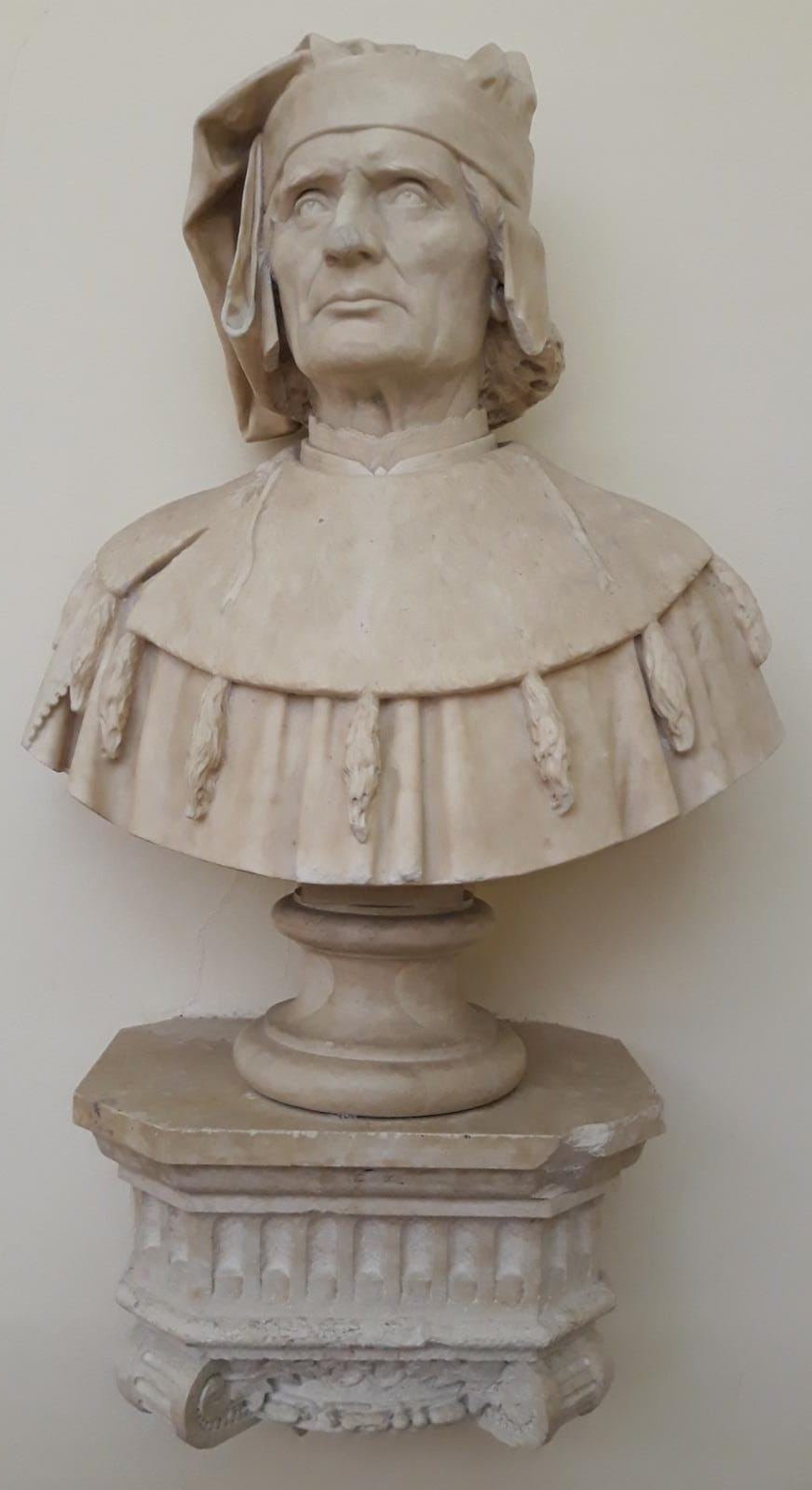
Bust of Alberto I della Scala in the public library of Verona.

Alberto della Scala was elected podestà and had what was later called the "Albertine Statute" drawn up, which revised the city's regulations: there was a "Major Council" made up of 500 citizens chosen by the podestà every year, while the heads of the Arts formed the "Council of the Craftsmen"; there were also minor ones, such as the "Council of the Elders" and the "Council of the LXXX." He was also able to make peace with Brescia, Mantua and Padua, Guelph cities at odds with Scaliger Ghibellism. It was during this period that the bishop of Verona allowed the Cimbri to settle in the semi-deserted territories of Lessinia. In the early 1290s Este, Parma and Reggio were occupied, while in 1297 Vicenza, bloodied by civil strife, spontaneously surrendered to Verona. The conquests continued in 1299 when, with his sons Alboino and Cangrande, Alberto also seized Feltre, Cividale, and Belluno.

Alberto I della Scala died in 1301 leaving three sons and his wife, Verde of Salizzole, who died in 1306: firstborn Bartolomeo, secondborn Alboino, and thirdborn Cangrande. The eldest son then took power, to whom Dante dedicated two tercets of Canto XVII of Paradise. He succeeded in taking over Riva and Arco in the Trentino region, but on 7 March 1304 he died childless and thus left his place to his brother Alboino. Alboino wanted his young brother Cangrande in power with him, with whom he obtained the Brescian shore of Lake Garda and won a number of battles against Este, Brescia, and Parma. In 1310 Emperor Henry VII appointed both of them as imperial vicars, but Alboino soon died and left power to his brother alone.

==== Maximum expansion and wealth of the Lordship ====
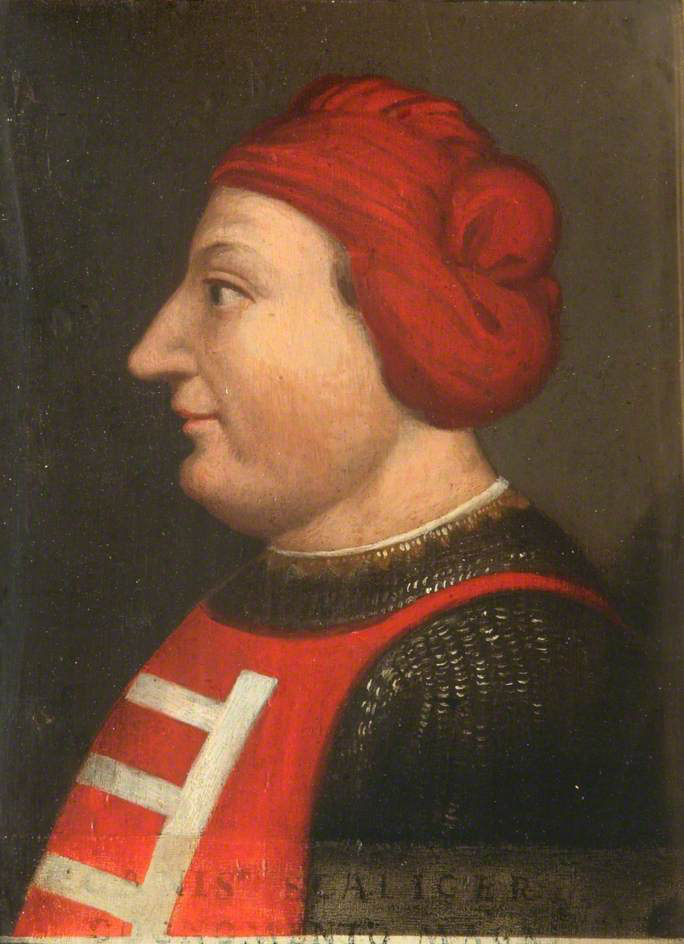
Eighteenth-century portrait of Cangrande della Scala, condottiere and patron who became the family's most illustrious figure

Cangrande della Scala was a respected lord; for the second period he hosted Dante, exiled from Florence, in the palace he had specially set up for the great political refugees, scientists, poets and talented artists whom he generously supported with money and gifts. To Cangrande he dedicated an honorable mention in Canto XVII of Paradise, dedicated to the Veronese prince: Dante hoped that this valiant and powerful ruler could bring about the Italian unification the poet had longed for.

It was then that Padua made a league with the Sambonifacio, Treviso and Aquileia, who signed a peace in 1314. However, as early as the following year, Padua invaded Vicenza: Cangrande then set out for the city with a troop of knights, where he put the enemy to flight and captured the Carrara. The prisoner was treated as a guest until the peace of 1315. In 1318, in Soncino, Cangrande was even appointed general of the Ghibelline League. In 1325, however, he was stricken with a serious illness and rumors spread that he had died: Federico della Scala, count of Valpolicella, had himself elected prince, but upon his recovery Cangrande banished him and his family, as well as the other families who participated in the plot (including the Montecchi).

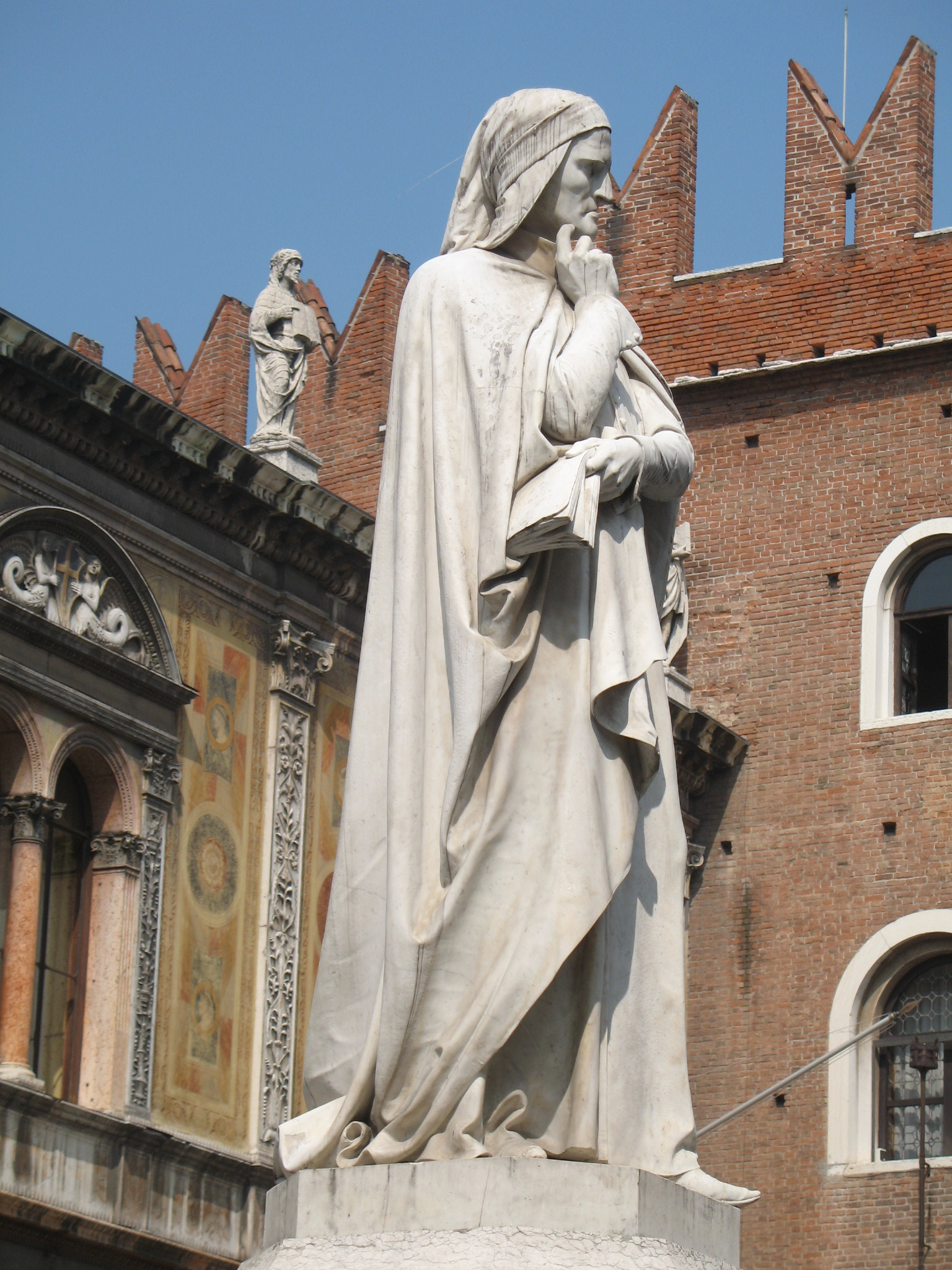
Dante's statue in Piazza dei Signori in Verona. The poet spent several years of his life at the court of the Scaligeri.

In 1328 a papal legate called a crusade against him (with a charge of heresy), to which several Guelph cities reacted but were defeated. Cangrande then succeeded in consolidating his rule over Padua and besieged Treviso, which shortly thereafter surrendered: he then became lord of Verona, Vicenza, Padua, Treviso, Belluno, Feltre, Monselice, and Bassano, as well as imperial vicar of Mantua and Italian Ghibelline leader. However, Cangrande died at the age of 38, beaten by a disease he contracted while drinking from a cold spring. Cangrande della Scala's untimely and unexpected death left the lordship without direct descendants (he had only daughters, as well as illegitimate males), so power was taken by his nephew Mastino II della Scala, who expanded the boundaries of the principality as far as Pontremoli and the Tyrrhenian Sea.

In 1328 Cangrande's illegitimate sons attempted a conspiracy to kill Alboino della Scala's sons (Alberto II and Mastino II), but were discovered and imprisoned. Mastino II on 8 August 1331 was elected “Captain General” of the league formed, in addition to Verona, by the Este family, the Gonzaga family and the Visconti family (later joined by Florence), to defend against the descent of the king of Bohemia (urged by the pope), who had already conquered some Lombard cities. Mastino II, at the head of the army, ran to the rescue of Ferrara (under siege): he won the battle and on his return to Verona was acclaimed by the population. He subsequently subdued Bergamo, given to the allies, Brescia, Parma, Lucca, Massa and Pontremoli, which were annexed to the Scaliger Lordship.

==== Decadence of the Lordship ====
Scaliger dominions at the height of their expansion (1336).

The two brothers ended up troubling the Republic of Venice, which, frightened by Verona's push toward Chioggia, formed an anti-Scaliger League with Florence, which was joined by Milan, Mantua and Este in 1337. The war had disastrous consequences for the Scaliger lordship, even resulting in Alberto II being taken prisoner. With the peace of 1339, which involved the Emperor Louis the Bavarian and a separate peace administration with the different contenders, Mastino II managed to save the Lordship and his brother at the cost of a significant territorial reduction: only Verona, Vicenza, Parma (later lost to Azzo da Correggio) and Lucca (separated from the territory, indefensible and therefore sold to Florence) remained.

An ambivalent situation was created with Mastino II, in which the defeated city, under the burden of high costs of territorial downsizing and again divided by discord among influential families, long maintained its reputation as a city of refuge for the many exiles from the fratricidal struggles among Italians. Because of its kinship with Emperor Ludovico, Verona became a kind of protectorate: these were times when the Scaligeri had less power than in the previous period but, despite this, they had the strength to commission and finance the landmarks that most commemorate them: Castelvecchio, the Scaliger bridge and the Scaliger Tombs, which preserve their remains.

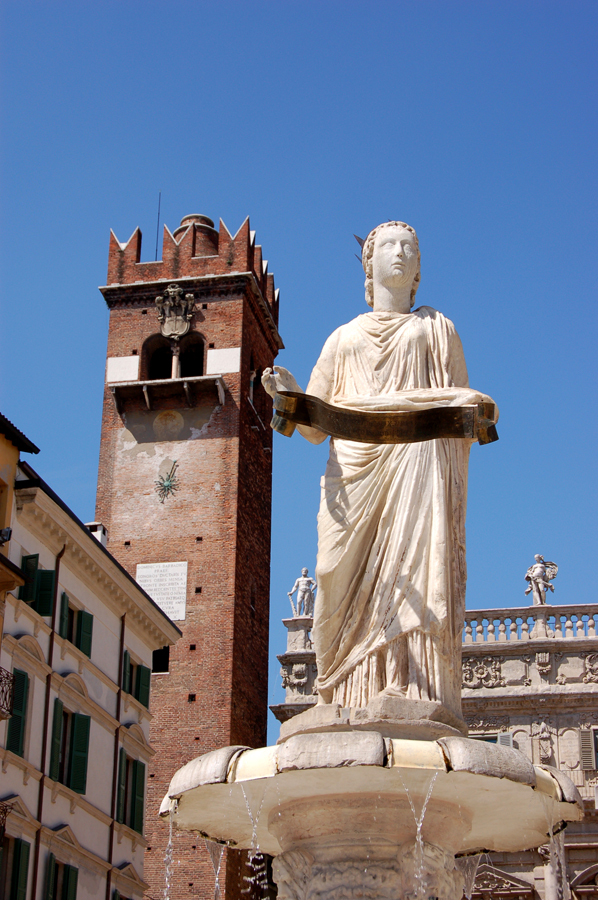
Two symbols of Scaliger Verona: in the foreground the statue of “Madonna Verona,” a Roman sculpture reused in a fountain commissioned by Cansignorio, and in the background the Gardello tower

Mastino II died in 1351 and the Lordship passed to his sons Cangrande II, Cansignorio, and Paolo Alboino, while Alberto II retired to private life and died soon after. The former was the actual ruler of the city. He behaved like some modern dictators, amassing wealth outside Verona for illegitimate sons, impoverishing it, and fueling internal strife until his death in 1359 at the hands of his brother Cansignorio. In contrast, the latter ruled in relative peace and embellished Verona to the point that it was nicknamed "Marmorina" for its abundance of ancient marble and Roman statues; he also had a new masonry bridge built over the Adige River, the Navi bridge, and placed the first clock on a tower in Italy, the Gardello tower, moved by water mechanisms.

Before his death in 1375, he ordered the death of his brother Paolo Alboino in order to ensure the succession to his illegitimate sons Bartolomeo II and Antonio, then not yet of age. The two young princes, however, became involved in a sort of protectorate of the Visconti, who took advantage of the political weakness of the moment and the heavy debt into which the city had fallen. Bernabò Visconti attacked Verona, claiming an inheritance for his wife Regina della Scala, sister of Cansignorio, but the Veronese forced them to flee following a sortie. For another six years the city remained in the hands of the Scaligeri, during which time Antonio had his brother killed so that he could rule alone: he had the Malaspina, the Nogarola (who had always been family friends) and the Bevilacqua blamed for this crime, and they managed to find refuge in Milan. They incited the Viscontis to wage war against Antonio; thus a league was formed between the Viscontis, Carraresi, Estensi and Gonzagas, which marked the end of the Della Scala lordship: the Veronese army fought two major battles, before its final defeat at the Battle of Castagnaro. Thus ended the independence of Verona and Antonio della Scala retreated to Venice; he died in 1388 in Tredozio, from where he had left with a small army for Verona.

=== The brief Visconti and Carrarese rule ===
The reign of the Visconti began on 20 October 1388; it was harsh, and the Veronese tried in vain to oppose it, as the rebellions were bloodily suppressed. Gian Galeazzo Visconti cared almost only about strengthening the city's wall defenses against the growing power of Venice. He therefore rebuilt the walls, erected the castles of San Pietro and San Felice, and built a military citadel within the city; the latter was an almost square fortress protected by a deep moat and walls, from which the district still takes its name. Against this complex of fortifications the revolt attempted in 1390 by the population broke down, as the Visconti troops, taken by surprise, retreated there. With the arrival of reinforcements, however, three days of looting followed, from 25 to 27 June. In 1393 Gian Galeazzo ordered a revision of the Statutes, by which the communal militia was suppressed.

With the death of Gian Galeazzo Visconti in 1402, the Visconti Lordship also collapsed in Verona, where Francesco II da Carrara made the citizens believe that he wanted to help put Guglielmo della Scala, son of Cangrande II, in charge of the city. He was actually helped to enter the city, where he was proclaimed lord by the enthusiastic people; a few hours later, however, Guglielmo died, poisoned by the Carrarese. Shortly after Guglielmo's sons were proclaimed lords by the citizens, the Carrarese had them arrested and seized power, a gesture that, however, was a contributing factor to the loss of his lordship in a short period of time. Venice, taking advantage of the discontent of the Veronese and the unrest that was continuing within the city, sent its army, which, aided in part by the people, managed to enter Verona and put the Carrara to flight.

== Venetian Verona ==
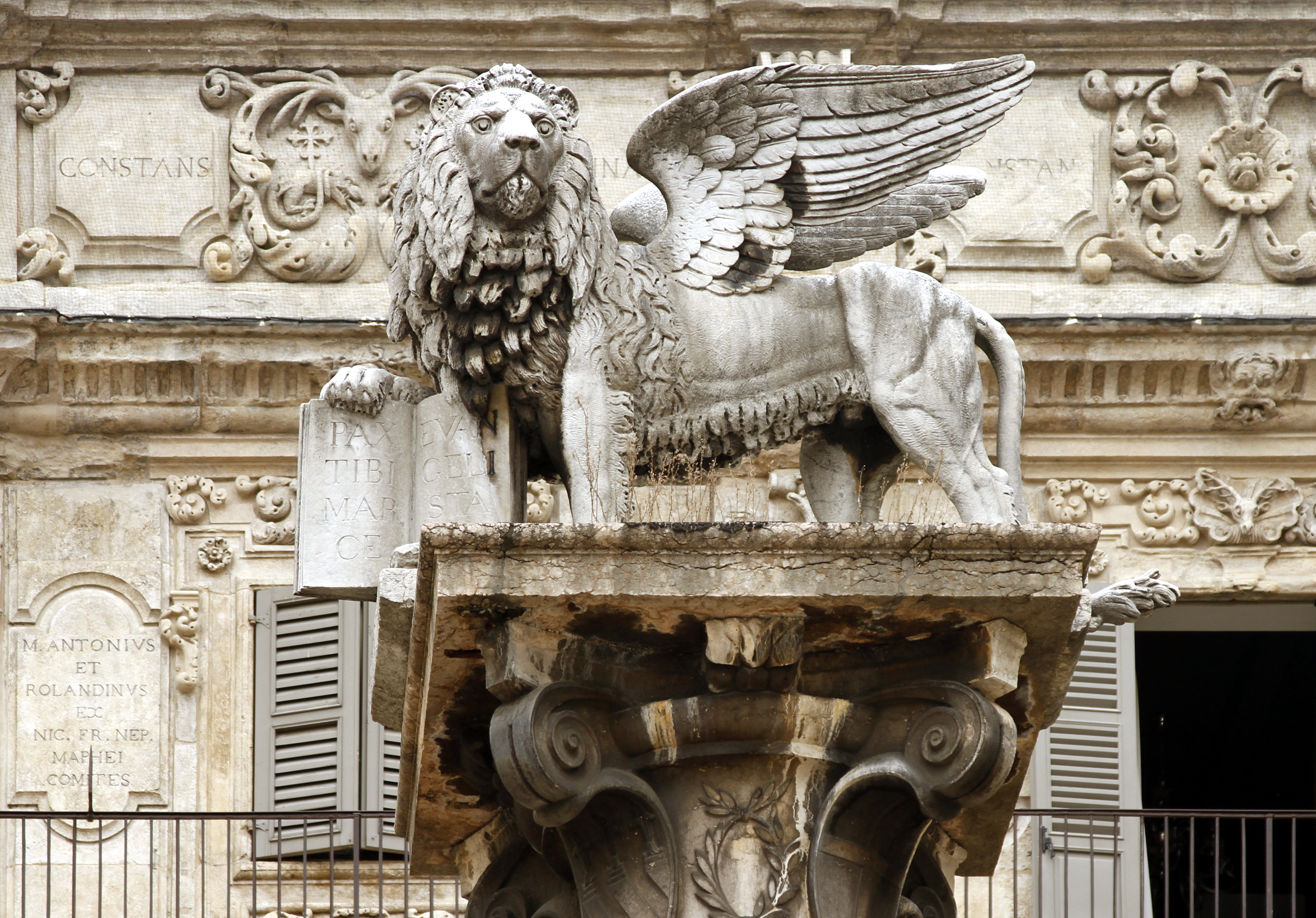
The insignia of the Serenissima placed atop a column in Piazza delle Erbe

On 24 June 1405 the citizens of Verona sent a delegation of forty people to Venice to bring the city's insignia to the Doge and swear allegiance to the Republic of Venice. Procurator Gabriele Emo was given the keys and seal of the city, while the banners of the municipality were placed in St. Mark's Square by Doge Michele Steno. In Verona, meanwhile, the carroccio was paraded triumphantly through the city streets, hoisting the banner of the Serenissima. On 16 July the city's privileges were enshrined in the “golden bull”: from then on, the city was ruled by two Venetians: the podestà, with civil functions, and the captain, with military functions.

Despite the enthusiasm that had spread through the city, when the population learned that Brunoro della Scala was preparing an army to retake the city, they attempted a rebellion in favor of the Scaliger: however, it was easily suppressed and it was not possible for Brunoro to penetrate the walls (during his lifetime he tried several times to regain power in Verona, but always unsuccessfully). This indicated the attachment and devotion the city had for the Scaliger dynasty.

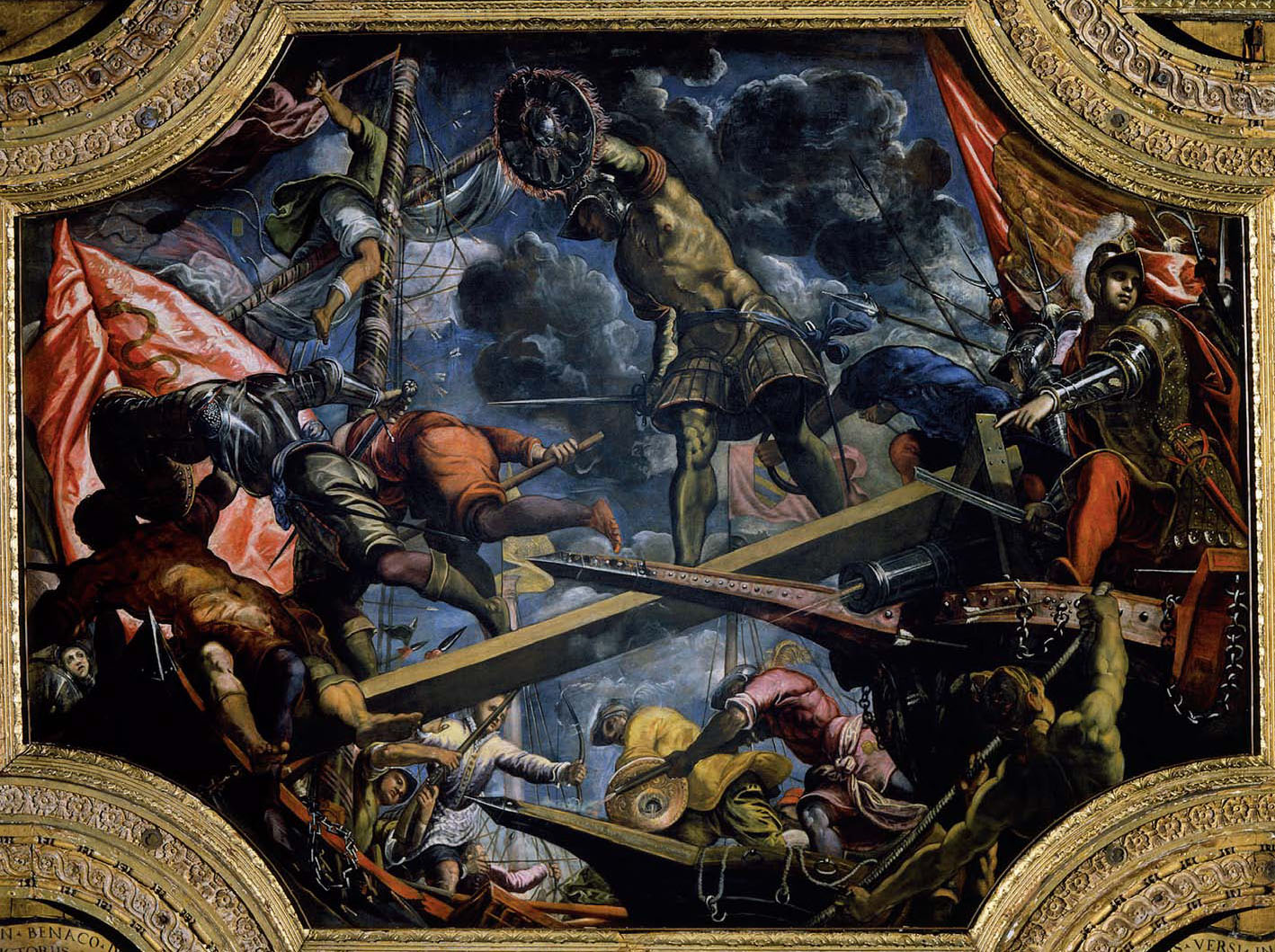
Tintoretto's painting depicting the battle on Lake Garda, following the feat of the galeas per montes

War broke out between Venice and Milan in 1438: an event that affected Verona was the passage of a fleet consisting of six galleys and twenty-five ships. This fleet sailed up the Adige River and reached almost as far as Rovereto, only to be transported to Lake Garda by land by climbing over the ridge of Mount Baldo through the Loppio Pass, pulled by 2,000 oxen; the voyage lasted fifteen days and is known as the feat of the galeas per montes. The fleet was used in the lake to counter the Milanese fleet, and was most successful in a battle near Riva del Garda, which forced the city to capitulate.

On 16 November Verona was stormed: the walls of the Citadel were breached and the gates of access to the city broken through, so the Milanese soldiers went on a looting spree, while the podestà and captain found refuge in Castel San Pietro and Castel San Felice. From there they asked Venice for help, and the troops arrived in four days: these entered north from Castel San Felice and managed to put the hostile troops to flight, who crowded near Ponte Nuovo, looking for an escape route. However, the bridge at that time was made of wood and could not support the weight of the soldiers: it collapsed and many drowned in the waters of the Adige, while as many as 2,000 were captured. The city then became completely free again on 20 November 1439, and with the stipulated peace Peschiera and Legnago became part of the province of Verona again.

The first Venetian century in Verona was marked by the construction of churches and monuments; the presence of the monk Giovanni da Verona and the Olivetans of Santa Maria in Organo brought printing to Verona, which from that time on became firmly established in local history. With the end of the war, moreover, the city enjoyed a long period of peace, which continued until 1501, when the Serenissima was attacked by the powers of the League of Cambrai.

=== The anti-Venetian League ===
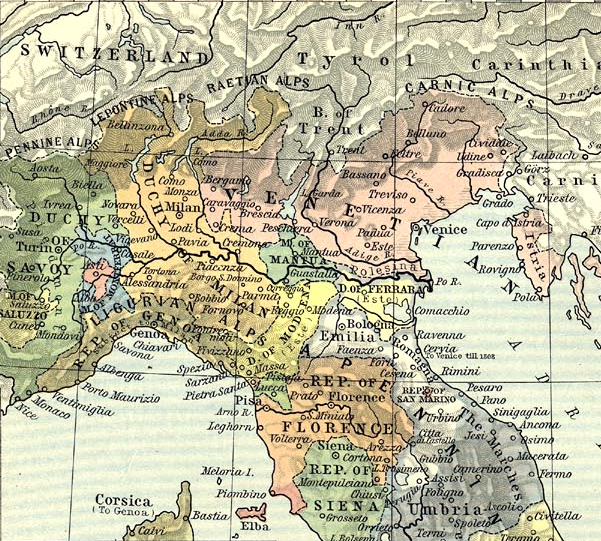
Northern Italy in 1494, a few years before the start of the War of the League of Cambrai.

At the beginning of the 16th century, Venice began to think about the creation of an Italian state, and for this the pontiff, Italian and European sovereigns united in the League of Cambrai, with the aim of taking away Venice's dominion of the mainland. In 1508 the Venetians set about fortifying cities, as the so-called War of the League of Cambrai had now broken out, initially suffering a series of defeats that led them to a general retreat to Verona. However, the city did not open its gates to the Venetian army, aware that if it gave shelter to the troops, it would be besieged by the enemy army; the Venetian army therefore had to cross the Adige River on a pontoon bridge. The representatives of the Venetian Republic understood the situation, so on 31 March 1509 they dissolved the oath of allegiance binding Verona so as to save the city, and recalled the army to defend Venice.

The Veronese decided to send ambassadors to the king of France, who triumphantly entered the city. On that occasion, the Veronese discovered that the city would be destined for Emperor Maximilian I, who wanted to make it the capital of a future Kingdom of Italy. French and Spanish troops (after whom the future bastion of Spain was named) flowed to garrison the city, committing acts of violence and robbery against the population. Meanwhile, the ageing Lake Garda fleet was disarmed, while the only three galleys still usable and armed were pulled out of the port of Lazise and sunk (they are still a destination for divers today).

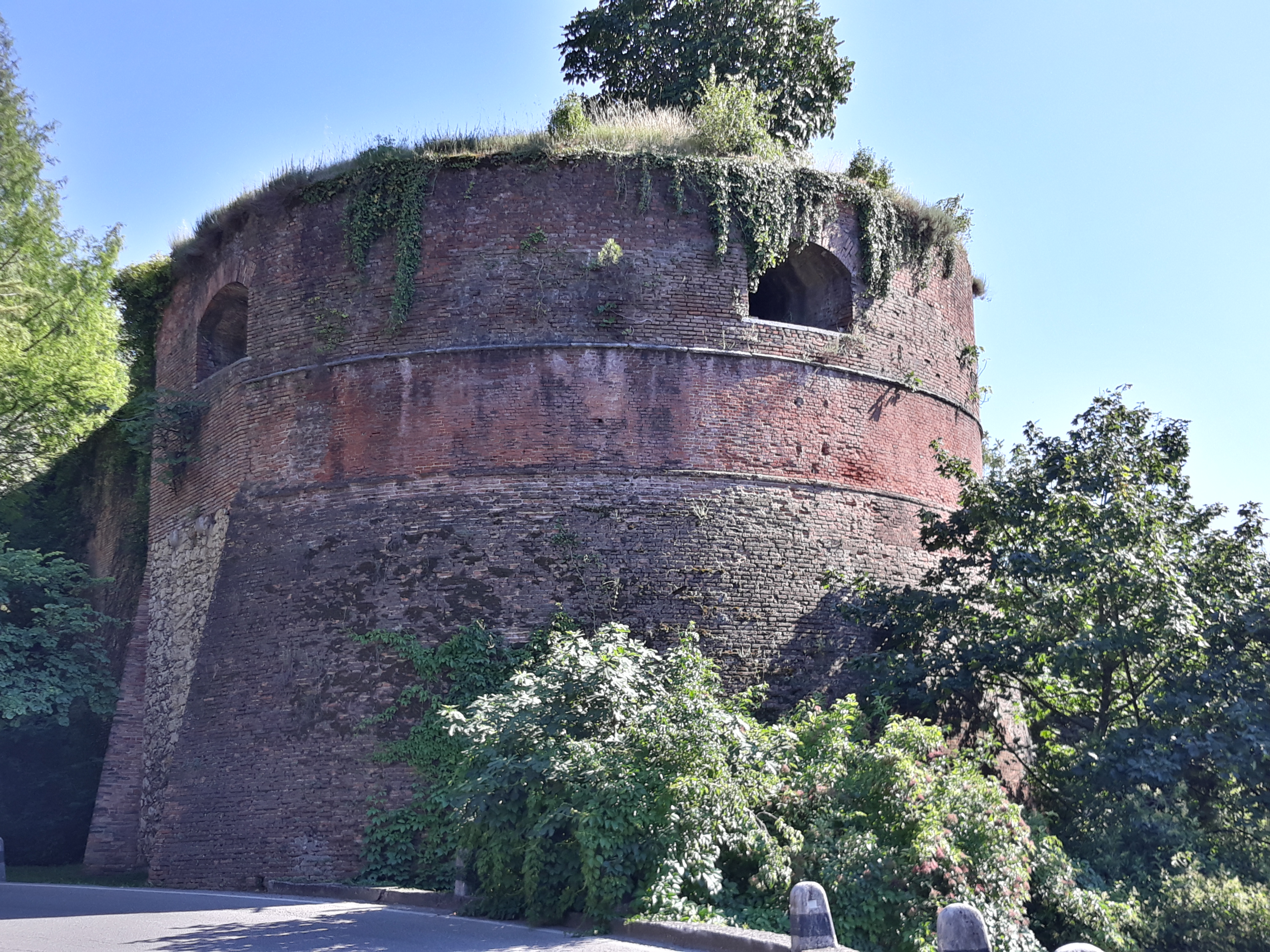
Rondella della Baccola, part of the Venetian defensive curtain designed by Michele Sanmicheli

In April 1510 a plot against the imperial troops was discovered in Verona, and as a reprisal numerous people were arrested and executed. The city also had 13,000 deaths in the plague of 1511-1512 (the population in one year fell from 38,000 to about 25,000). There was, however, reconciliation between the papacy and Venice, so the French sided with the Serenissima: they thus succeeded in besieging Verona, which was, however, well defended. At the end of 1516, after a hard Venetian siege, the emperor, following the Treaty of Brussels on 3 December, gave Verona to his nephew Charles V of Spain; Charles V ceded it to the French, who after a year, with the dissolution of the League of Cambrai, returned it to the Venetians. The Venetians, aware of the inadequacy of Verona's defenses in the face of the development of the new firearms, began to fortify the city in keeping with the times, making Verona once again a military city. The work on the new defensive walls was entrusted to the architect Michele Sanmicheli.

=== Three centuries without war ===
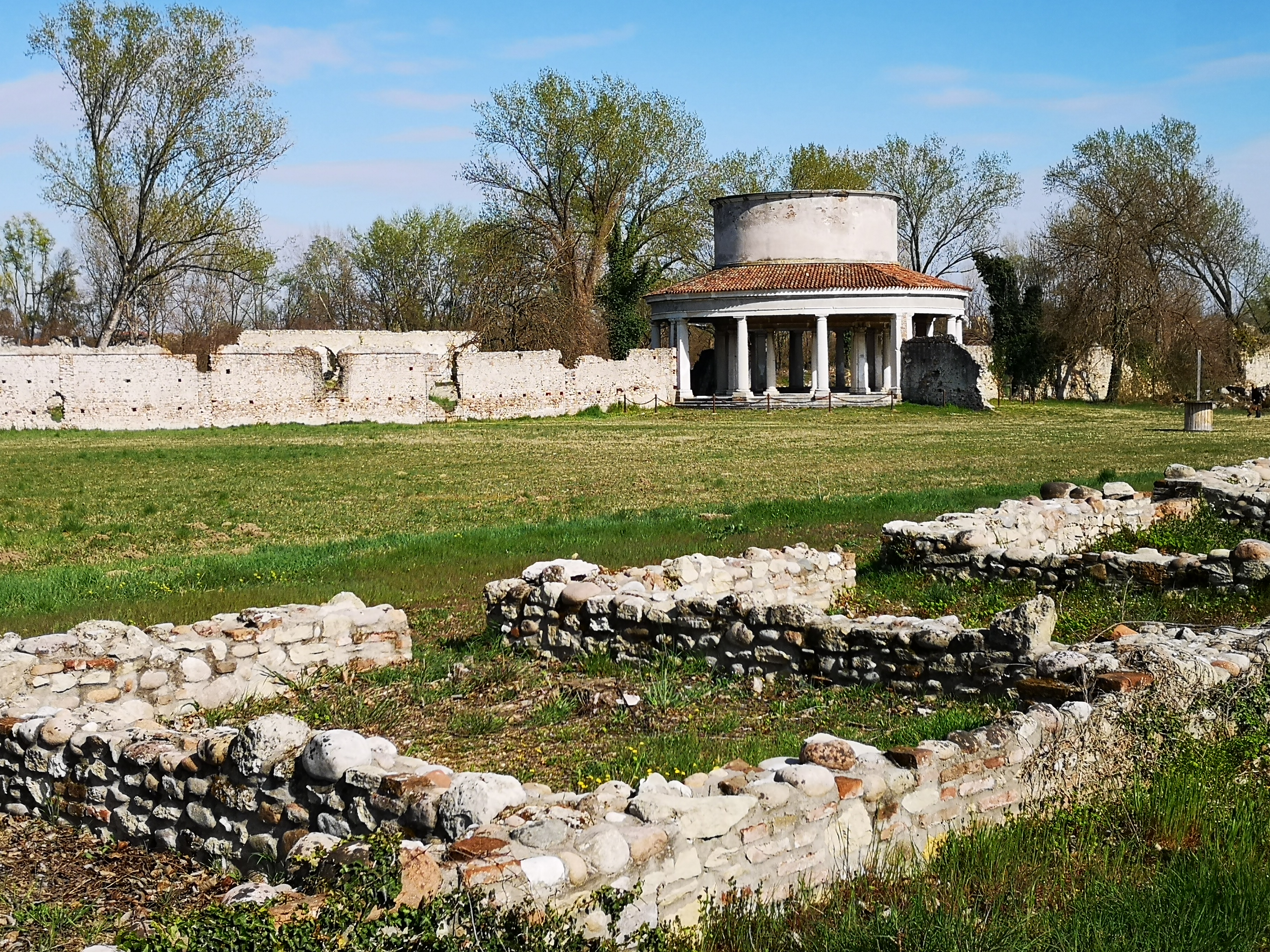
Verona's lazaretto, a place where the sick were housed during the plague of 1630.

When the war ended, a new period of peace began for Verona that would end not because of a new war, but because of a devastating disease: the plague epidemic of 1630, spread by German soldiers who had arrived in Italy for the capture of Mantua. The sick were sent by river to Sanmicheli's Lazzaretto (the ruins of which remain today) while the bodies of those who died in the city were burned or thrown into the Adige due to a lack of burial places. In 1626 53,333 inhabitants had been recorded, which had been reduced to 20,738 by the end of the contagion: more than half the population died. The number of inhabitants returned to a similar level only at the end of the eighteenth century (in 1793 there were 49,000). The sixteenth century, however, saw a revival of the economy and the construction of important churches and palaces, of which one of the most important architects was the aforementioned Michele Sammicheli. This period of artistic and cultural revival also saw the birth of the technique of Veronese bell ringing, as well as dozens of academies and cultural activities at the European level.

In the early eighteenth century wars resumed, although they did not directly involve the city: in 1701 the War of the Spanish Succession pitted France and Austria against each other, while the Republic of Venice remained neutral (although it strengthened its garrison in Verona). The French attempted to stop the enemy descent through the Brenner Pass, thus going to occupy Mount Baldo in order to stop the Austrians in the Adige Valley from above (violating Venetian neutrality). Prince Eugene of Savoy, informed of the facts, succeeded in the feat of ascending the very steep slopes of the Lessini mountains with 25,000 Austrian soldiers, who then descended to the east of Verona, headed for Legnago and defeated the French at Carpi, forcing them to retreat across the Mincio River.

=== The fall of the Serenissima ===
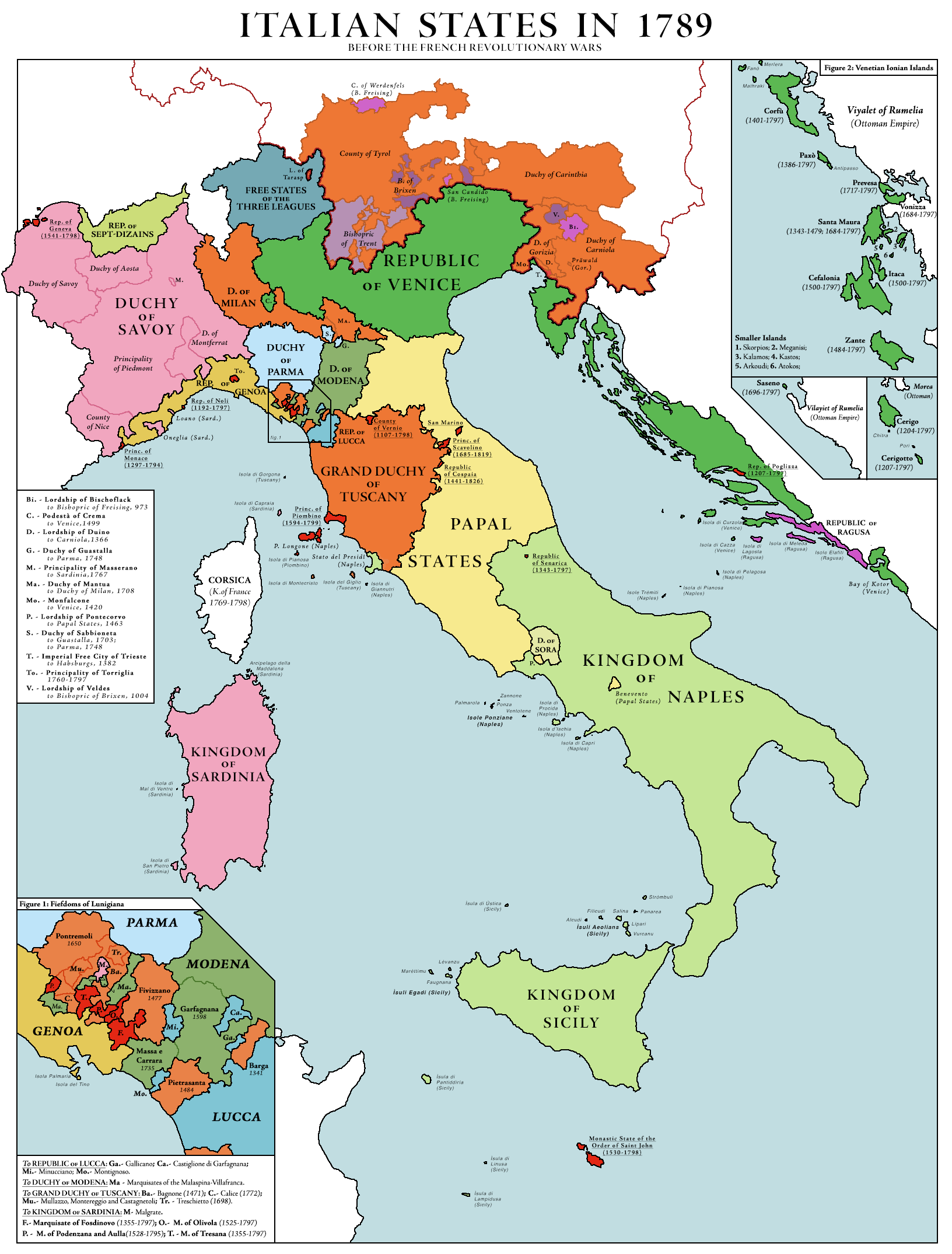
Republic of Venice in 1789, a few years before the Napoleonic Italian campaign.

In May 1796, during the Italian campaign, the Austrians were defeated in Piedmont by General Napoleon Bonaparte, and had to make a precipitous retreat as far as Trentino, while Napoleon and French revolutionary ideas were disrupting the tranquility of the Veronese: the retreating Austrians in fact occupied Peschiera, violating Venetian neutrality, and Napoleon took the opportunity to occupy Peschiera and then, on 1 June 1796, Verona with 12,000 men. On 3 June, accompanied by several generals and 500 cavalrymen, Napoleon arrived, and he immediately asked for large contributions from the people of Verona. He took lodgings at the Palazzo Forti, while the other generals settled in the houses of the nobles who had fled before their arrival. Already two months later, however, the French general was forced to leave the city by the arrival of the Austrian troops, which were greeted with enthusiasm as the population hoped that they would reconstitute the Venetian government. After initial victories, however, the Austrians suffered some harsh defeats, and on 7 August they had to retreat and deploy just outside Verona. The next day the French reached the city and, after destroying the Porta San Zeno with artillery, began to sack the city.

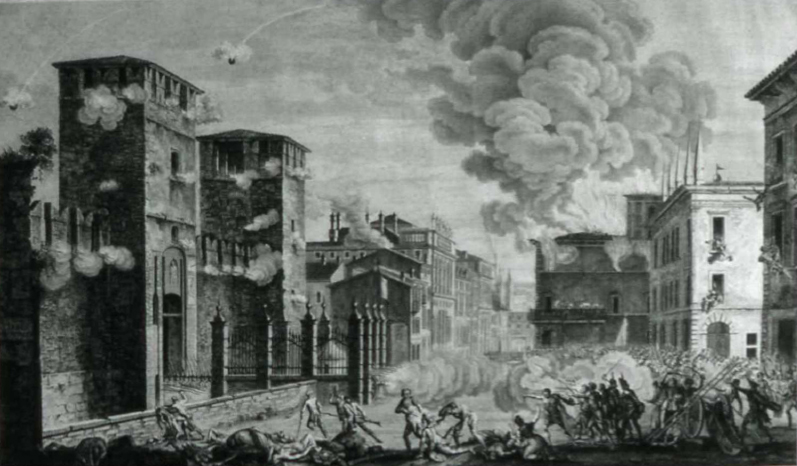
An episode of the Veronese Easter

Napoleon returned to Verona on 22 October, while in November Austrian troops approached again, but were taken from behind and defeated at the Battle of Arcole on 17 November. In mid-January another Austrian incursion was again defeated at the Battle of Rivoli, when Napoleon had to stop again in the city. On the second day of Easter 1797, however, popular uprisings against the French troops began, which took the name, precisely, of Veronese Easter, the only case in Italy of such an open rebellion against the barbarity of Napoleon's troops. The uprising, which began on 17 April and continued until 25 April, when the city was surrounded by 15,000 soldiers and had to surrender. In the end French casualties amounted to 500 soldiers, the wounded were about a thousand and the prisoners 2,400.

As a result, French oppression of the city increased and the city was forced to pay 2,000,000 Turin lire and confiscate silver from the churches and reserves of food, clothing and shoes: the large number of French soldiers to be maintained (over 50,000) created many problems of supply, with the constant search for loot and the disregard for religious freedom and property, so that any opportunity to confiscate property was taken. In the months following the rebellion, death sentences were carried out, in some cases without trial. Under the French, however, there was also a declaration of equality among all citizens, including the Israelite minority (about a thousand people). This was the official end of the Venetian rule, after more than four centuries of history.

== French Verona ==
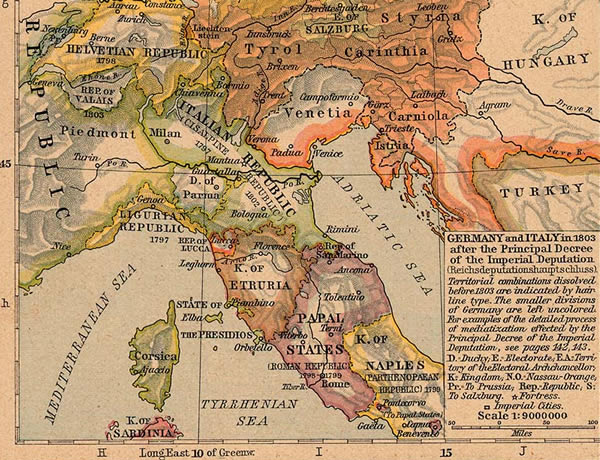
Political division of the Italian peninsula in 1803, with Verona split in two between the Cisalpine Republic and the Archduchy of Austria

On 9 July 1797 the Cisalpine Republic was proclaimed and on 17 October the Treaty of Campo Formio was signed, by which the Republic of Venice was divided between Austria and France.Verona was ceded to the Austrians on 21 January 1798, but as early as 26 March battles between the two adversaries resumed in Veronese territory, until the subsequent Treaty of Lunéville on 9 February 1801, in which the city was divided in half between Austria and France, with the border line being the Adige River. It was at this moment in history that the French derogatorily called the Austrian part of Verona Veronette, which still bears the name Veronetta today. The French part of the city then became part of the newly formed Kingdom of Italy on 31 March 1805.

In October a battle began between the two sides of Verona, with the Napoleonic bombardment succeeding in repelling an Austrian attack near the Castelvecchio Bridge: the Austrian part of the city surrendered on the 29th of the same month; finally with the Peace of Pressburg on 2 December the whole of Veneto became part of the Kingdom of Italy. The French left Verona only on 4 February 1814, after seventeen years of alternating rule: on the same day the Austrians entered the city from Porta Vescovo with 1,800 soldiers.

== Austrian Verona ==
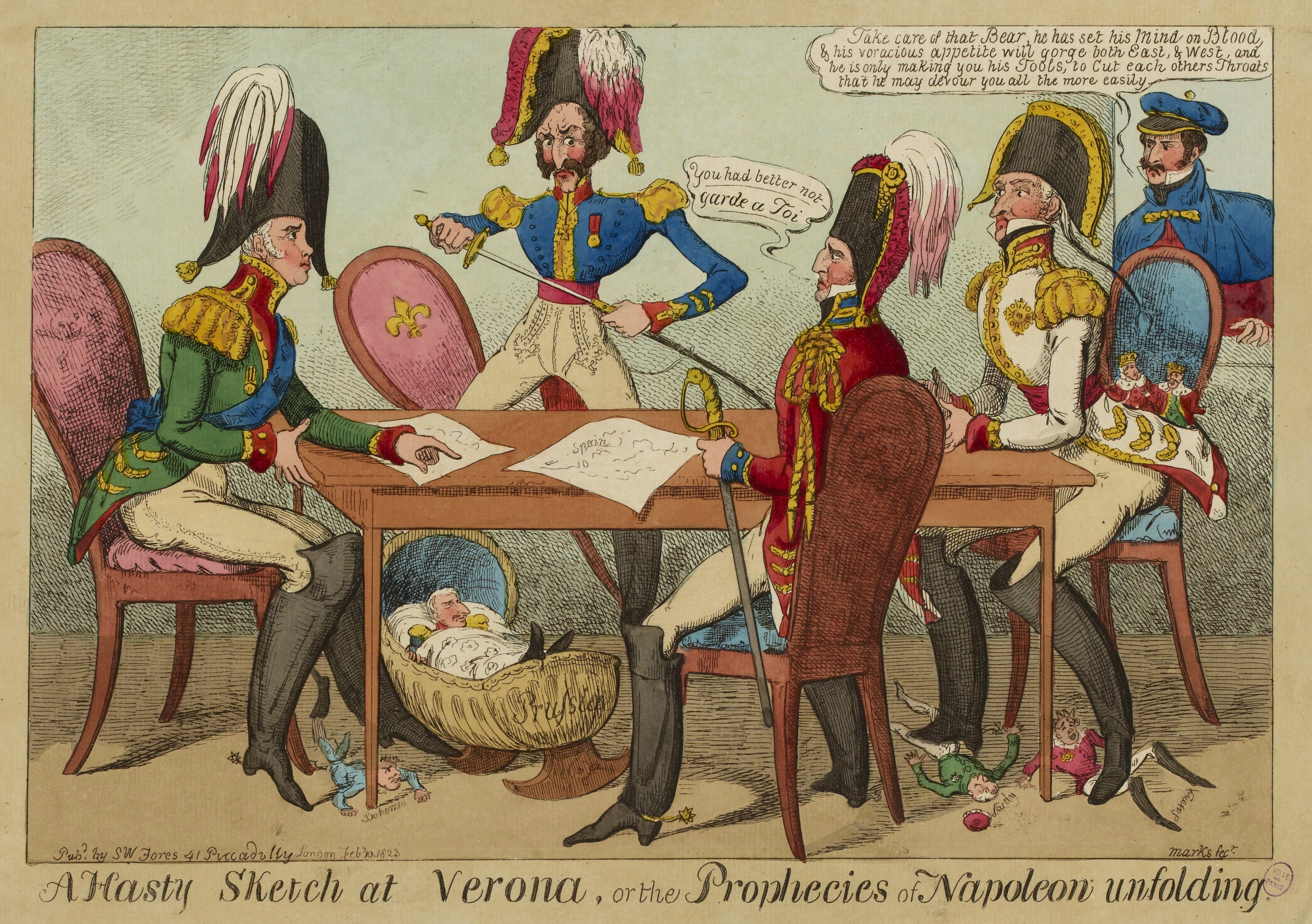
Satirical illustration about the Congress of Verona

At the Congress of Vienna in 1815, an event that kicked off the Conservative Order, the creation of the Kingdom of Lombardy-Venetia, a new state dependent on the Austrian Empire with a viceroy from the Viennese court at its head, was decided at the table, and the following year it had a first visit from Emperor Francis I. With the transition to Austrian rule, Verona's silk industry, which had taken the place of the wool industry during Venetian rule, had a major crisis, partly because Austria was mainly interested in rebuilding Verona's fortifications. Transportation on the Adige River also went down, as its role as a communication route was taken by the railroad.

In 1822 the Congress of Verona was held, attended by all the major rulers of Europe, and during which a wide variety of problems were discussed: the slave trade, piracy in the Atlantic Ocean, the Italian situation, and the problems caused by the Spanish and Greek revolutions.

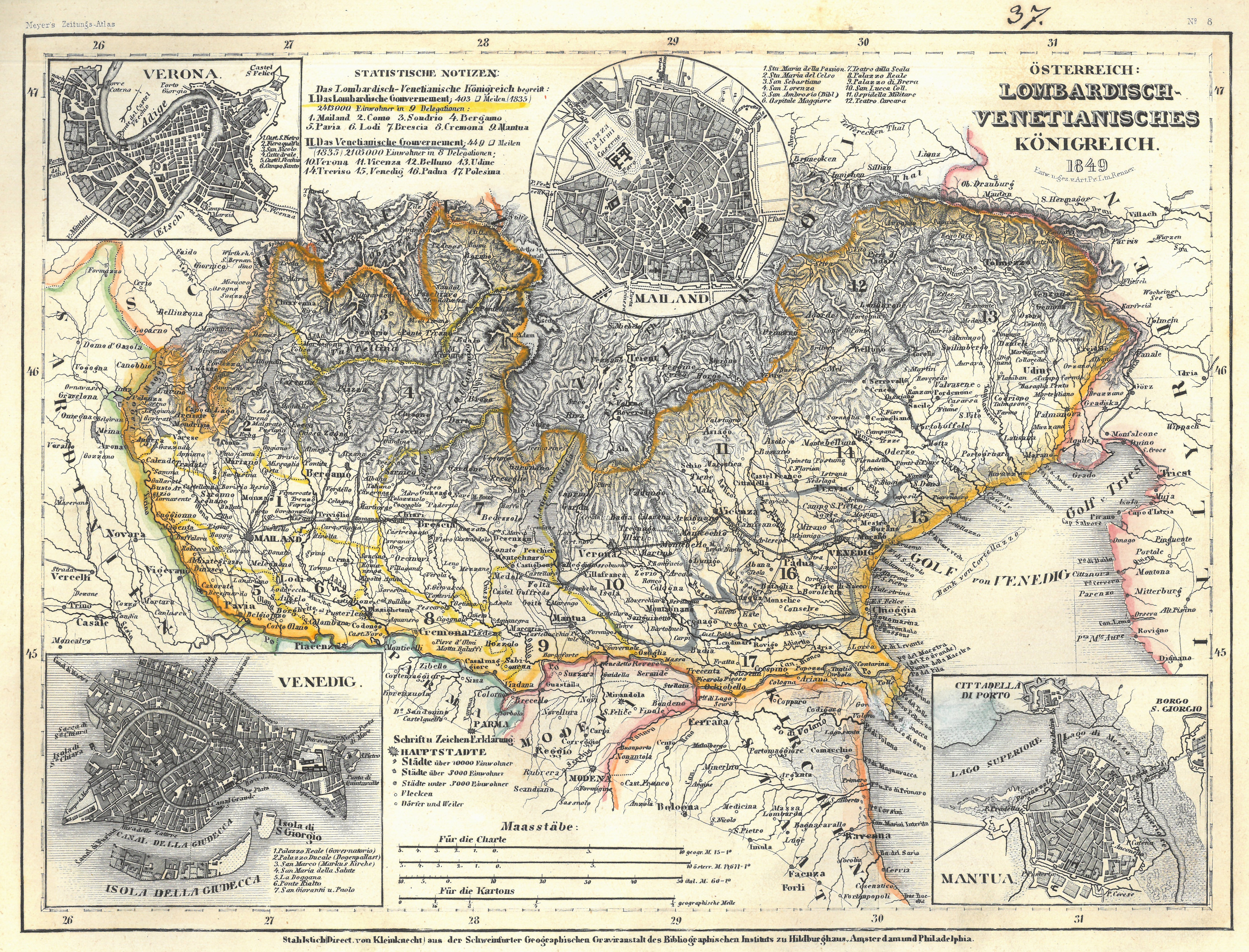
Map representing the Kingdom of Lombardy-Venetia in 1853, with a view of Verona and other important cities

In 1833, Austrian military engineers began to build a defensive system consisting of, in addition to the rampart walls, forts, castles, barracks, and various buildings, making Verona a city-stronghold. The work required the simultaneous employment of 10,000 men so that the city was virtually free of unemployment. To celebrate the end of the works, directed by Field Marshal Radetzky, there were large military parades. The French, who destroyed much of the city walls before leaving, and the Austrians had a quite different approach to the city; the latter gave it mainly two characterizations:

- the military one: the city was the cornerstone of the Quadrilatero, a fortified defense system based on four fortified cities: Verona, Legnago, Mantua, and Peschiera. Verona was the pivot of the system, so much so that it could accommodate up to 35,000 soldiers.
- the logistical one: it became the center of both road and rail communication systems, for which numerous barracks and depots were built.

The control of the city was very strict, partly because of the ideas that Mazzini was spreading throughout Italy, and which did not take long to arrive in the Venetian city as well; the poet Aleardo Aleardi was even arrested because he had embedded a coin of the Kingdom of Italy in his cane. This police control increased the population's hatred of foreign soldiers, a hatred that increased particularly after 1840: brawls between commoners and soldiers occurred sporadically in the city, soon resulting in serious clashes (with deaths and injuries) and patriotic demonstrations, such as those that occurred at the Teatro Nuovo.

=== 1848 ===
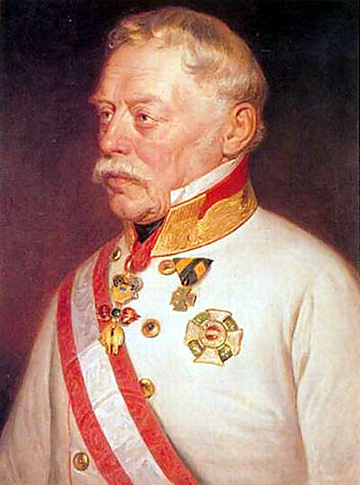
Field Marshal Radetzky in Austrian uniform.

1848 was the year of revolutions throughout Europe: in Milan the viceroy Rainer Joseph of Habsburg-Lorraine was driven out during the Five Days, while in Venice the Austrian governor had to flee; Field Marshal Radetzky then had to proclaim a state of siege in Lombardy-Venetia. The people of Verona also went into turmoil, despite which the viceroy sought refuge in the city, where he went to stay in a hotel. By this time, however, the population had taken to the streets to demand the Constitution, freedom, and unification of Italy. At one point the crowd made its way to the hotel where the viceroy was staying: the commoners shouted at him to look out onto the balcony, and when he did, they began to shout “Down with Austria! Death to the Germans!” The viceroy returned frightened, while the crowd insulted and provoked the soldiers defending the hotel, who, however, did not react. It was then that a group of moderate citizens went to deal with the viceroy, thus calming the crowd: they informed the population to meet in Piazza Erbe the next day at ten o'clock in the morning, as they had a lot to discuss. In the meantime, clashes between population and troops were avoided in the city: in this way the commoners were not spurred to start the revolt, giving the retreating Austrian army a safe place to reorganize, since the major cities of Lombardy-Venetia had already revolted. The Quadrilatero was thus a key rallying point for the retreating Austrians.

The next morning the population, with cockades and tricolor flags, gathered in the square awaiting news, when the group of moderates appeared, revealing that they had been promised a constitutional government, the creation of a city guard to enforce order, and that freedom would be guaranteed. Tricked by this small group of citizens, the people calmed down, and Verona was one of the few cities not to join the Italian Risorgimento uprisings. In fact, the city guard was composed of only about 40 Veronese, while at the same time the Austrian military garrison was reinforced, thus decreasing the chances of revolt in the city. By March 1848 the city was now home to 6,000 soldiers, thus the ratio of one soldier for every ten inhabitants had been reached. On 22 March Radetzky withdrew from Milan and fell back to Verona with another 20,000 men, while on the 25th it was the viceroy who fled the city. On the 28th General D'Aspre received orders to move his troops from the province of Venice to Verona. The city became a huge encampment for the troops, and even the factories were closed and used as soldiers' quarters.

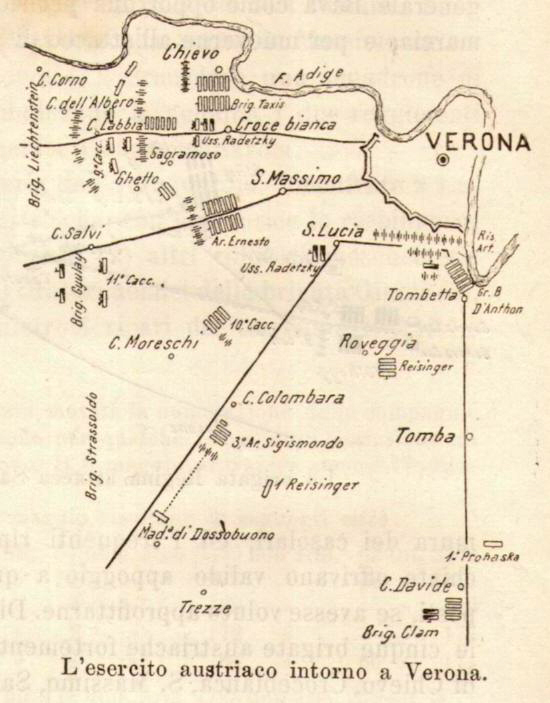
The deployment of Austrian forces around Verona

Meanwhile, the Piedmontese continued to win battles, but moved rather slowly, giving the enemy time to retreat as far as the Quadrilatero. The Piedmontese troops succeeded in encircling Peschiera, while volunteer troops pushed their way up to Castelnuovo del Garda; Radetzky then gave orders for 4,000 men to attack it, to suppress the action and give a "lesson" to the other villages in the countryside. Before the start of the Battle of Castelnuovo some of the inhabitants managed to flee, while the 400 volunteers decided to resist and face the enemy army; however, they were overwhelmed by the tenfold outnumbered enemy troops and had to retreat toward Lazise. The Austrians set fire to the entire village, destroying and looting everything they found; many women were raped and slaughtered along with their husbands. The volunteers who were captured were instead tortured to death.

In April General Nugent led an additional 14,000 men to Verona to help Radetzky, while the Piedmontese army slowly advanced with 300 cannons in the direction of the city. Only on 26 April was a new advance made as far as the Adige River and the occupation of the Villafranca-Custoza-Sona line. Radetzky had all the gates of entry to the city blocked off and numerous barricades built, as well as forbidding the population to climb on the roofs of palaces (so that they would not see what was happening) and closing the entrances to bell towers (so that they would not call the citizens to revolt).

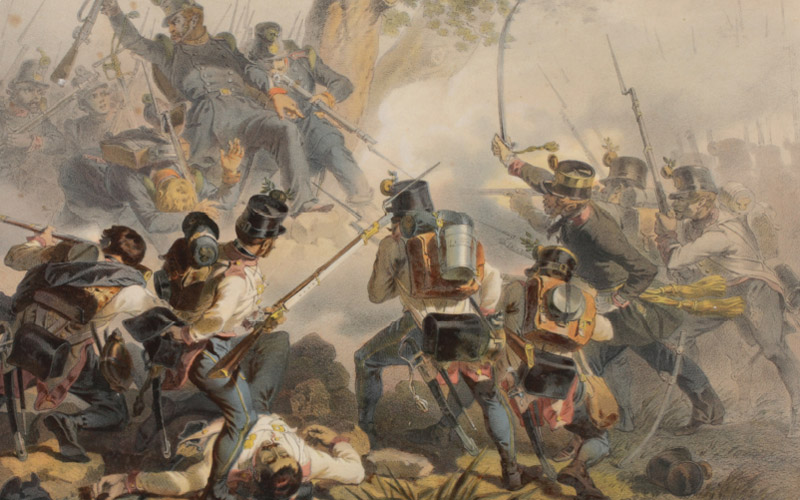
The Piedmontese attacked during the Battle of Santa Lucia, effectively countered by the Austrians

Radetzky had Santa Lucia and San Massimo, two small villages on the outskirts of the city, occupied, while the first clashes took place in Lugagnano: the Piedmontese deluded themselves that they could win and approached Santa Lucia, where the battle of the same name took place. There the Austrians were about to be defeated, so King Charles Albert expected an uprising of the city: this did not take place because ten battalions, totaling 10,000 men, were present in the city at that time to discourage the insurrection, while the artilleries were ready to bombard the city from the forts, not to mention that in the meantime most of the weapons had been confiscated. After the news that the troops at Croce Bianca had been defeated, however, the king decided to withdraw: this was the first Austrian victory since the beginning of the war. At the end of May, Generals Thurn and Nugent arrived in Verona, so on the 30th Radetzky was able to leave Verona with 30,000 soldiers, 5,000 horses and 150 cannons, driving the Piedmontese troops away from Verona, who retreated as far as the Adda River. Only Peschiera heroically resisted the Austrian siege, and only by order of Charles Albert did it surrender: the soldiers were left free and with the honours of war by the Austrians for their incredible resistance. In the end, the Quadrilatero had served its purpose admirably.

=== From 1848 to 1866 ===
The Magistral Walls and the numerous forts built by the Austrians to defend Verona

On 9 June 1849 orders arrived from Vienna to make Verona the most fortified city in the Empire: work started immediately, first with the construction of the eight forts that formed the first entrenched camp, dedicated to the victorious generals of the war and especially to those who saved Verona in '48. However, with the new year, taxes also increased as the works were very expensive, and in addition the population had to maintain the 120,000 soldiers deployed in Lombardy-Veneto.

Numerous patriotic committees sprang up in many cities of the Kingdom, headed by the one in Mantua. The authorities discovered the conspiracies and the martyrdom of Belfiore took place between 8 December 1852 and 19 March 1853. The leading member of the Veronese committee, Carlo Montanari, was also captured and imprisoned in the castle of Mantua, and on 8 March 1853 he was executed.

The Second War of Independence also had its climax in Verona, for the Franco-Piedmontese army, after several victorious battles, arrived not far from the Venetian city. Napoleon III, however, stipulated an armistice with the Emperor of Austria at Villafranca, infuriating King Victor Emmanuel, who would have liked to continue the war, even alone (which he did not do, for fear of having to fight both Austria and France). The following year, moreover, Verona was a participant in the Expedition of the Thousand, with 23 volunteers. Finally, the Third War of Independence saw the greatest battle at Custoza, with a heavy Italian defeat: however, thanks to the crushing Prussian victory, which had greatly weakened Austria, Verona and the Veneto region could be united with the Kingdom of Italy.

== Italian Verona ==
=== Plebiscite ===
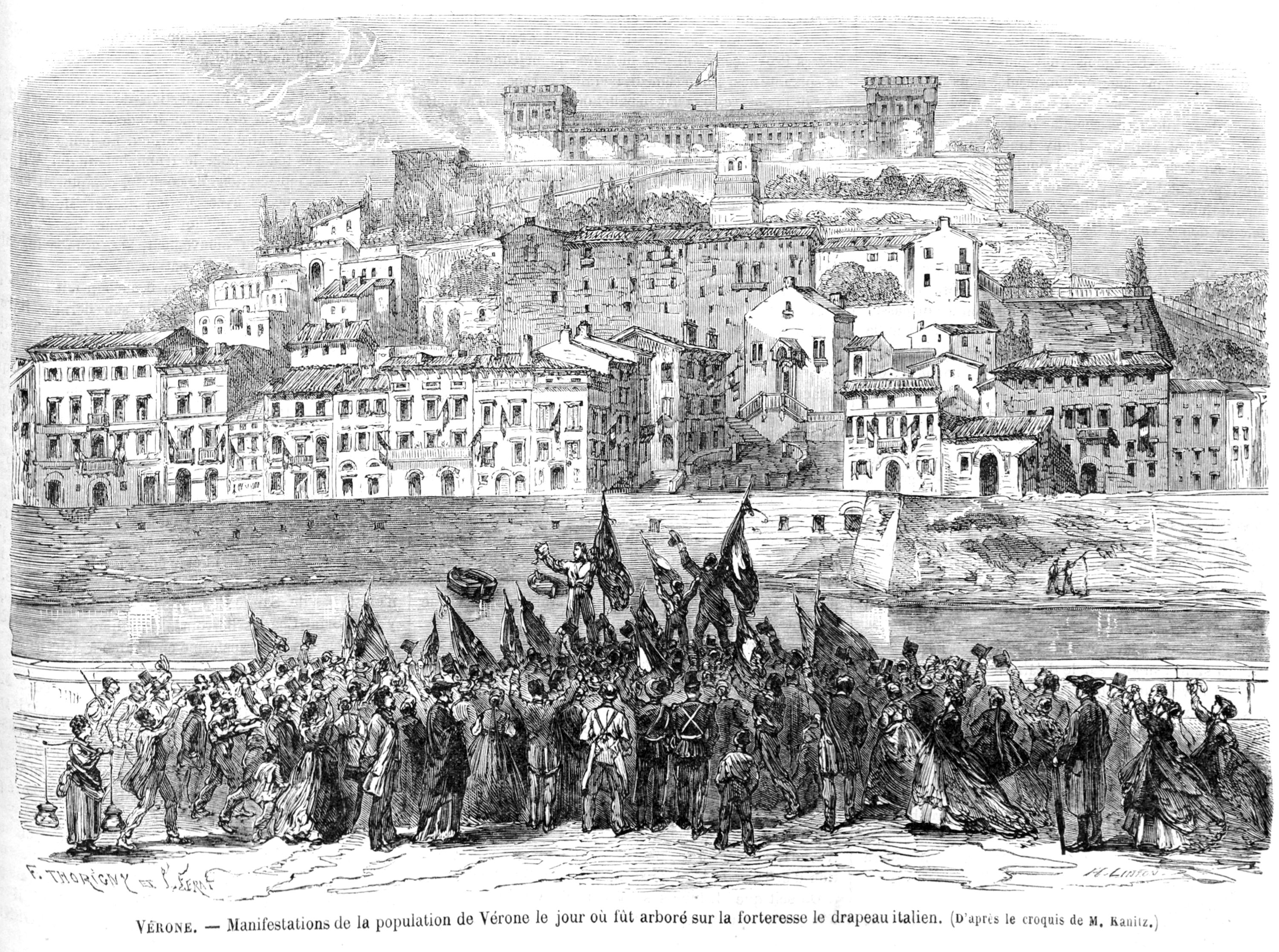
Illustration from Le Monde Illustré depicting the Italian flag carried to Castel San Pietro

The news of peace between Italy and Austria was published in Verona on 6 October, and immediately the city was filled with tricolor flags and portraits of the king and Garibaldi were displayed in store windows. A part of the citizens gathered in Piazza Bra where, at a military bar, there were numerous Austrians; a large tricolor flag was unfurled from the building above the bar, but enraged soldiers beat up a child dressed as a Garibaldian and took the large flag and then attempted to strike the crowd, which responded by throwing stones and chairs. When the garrisons arrived, however, the latter had to take refuge, while the Austrians went on to loot stores and buildings. In one store they also killed a pregnant woman, Carlotta Aschieri, while they bayoneted her husband several times as he tried to defend her.

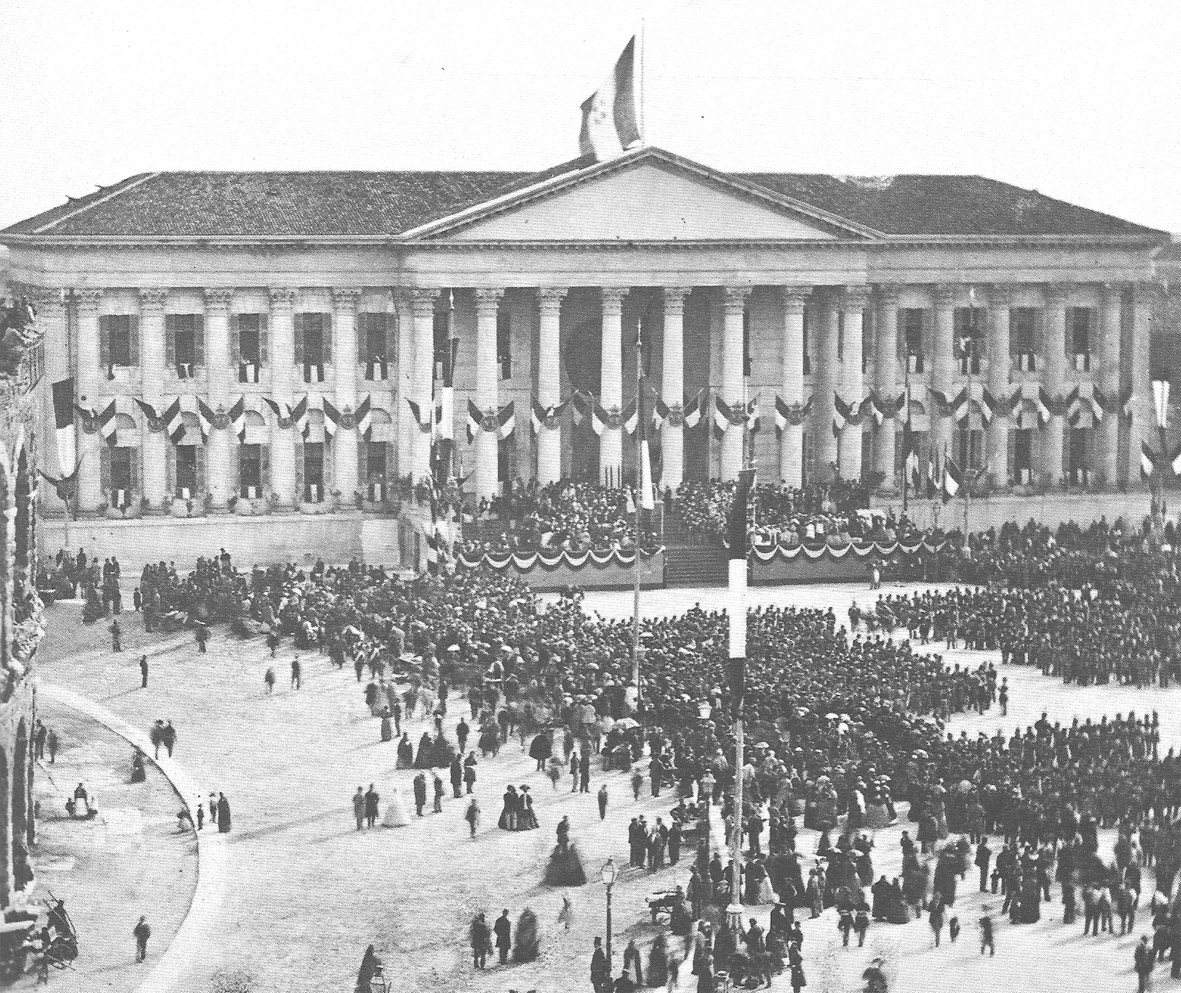
Celebrations for the entry of Italian troops into Piazza Bra

Two workers, Celeste Bardi and Gio Batta Ridolfi, were also assaulted, while Angelo Menegotti was shot in the back and Francesco Vassanelli lost an eye to an officer's saber. The violence continued for two days, and according to official records there were about 20 wounded.

The Italians entered the city on 16 October 1866, from Porta Vescovo with the bersaglieri, who paraded through two wings of crowds and with bells ringing. The last Austrian battalion lowered the flag with the double-headed eagle on the same day at the Gran Guardia Nuova, where an inscription by an Austrian officer was later found: “Farewell my beautiful Verona! I will never see you again!” On the following 21 and 22 October, the plebiscite of Veneto sanctioned the union to the Kingdom of Italy with 88,864 votes in favor and two against, as evidenced by the plaque placed at the entrance of the present-day City Hall and recalling the ballot of the province of Verona. The result reflected, according to some historical studies, the absolute lack of secrecy in the voting process and transparency in the subsequent counting of votes. There were different colored ballots in two separate ballot boxes for the yes and no votes. The voters were simply asked if they agreed to unite Veneto with Italy, without specifying what would happen if, hypothetically, the "No" vote won.

=== From 1866 to the Great War ===
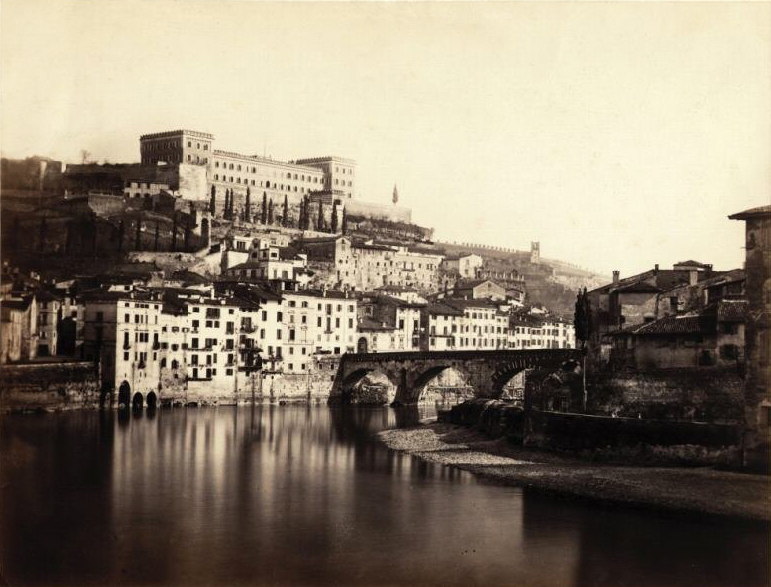
Photograph prior to the flood of 1882, still showing the characteristic dwellings abutting the river that were later torn down to make way for the walls

The end of the century saw Verona severely affected by the great flood of 1882, which occurred between 15 and 18 September, and peaked on 17 September, when the flood reached 4.5 meters above the freezing point. The flood caused the collapse of several buildings, while the mills on the Adige River were dislodged, crashing into bridges, two of which were completely destroyed. At the end of the flood there were thirteen houses completely collapsed, about thirty severely damaged, and more than 170 damaged. The army also intervened to provide relief to the population, while King Umberto I came to visit the people of Verona on 22 September. A consequence of the disastrous flood was the construction of imposing embankments, known by the name of "muraglioni," for the construction of which 120 buildings erected close to the river were demolished. The major river works were built between 1885 and 1895.

In 1886 the lion of St. Mark was inaugurated in Piazza delle Erbe, rebuilt after it had been torn down by the French in 1797. An enthusiastic crowd was present at its inauguration, who saw the lion as a patriotic symbol. However, the end of the nineteenth century also saw the economic crisis hit the city, and thus the beginning of the great emigration, which would continue until after World War I. In Veneto there was already a migratory phenomenon of a mostly temporary or seasonal nature, particularly towards Germany, Austria and Hungary, especially from the mountainous areas, but this increased until it became a mass phenomenon. With the emergence of new transoceanic routes, emigration to the New World began: the favorite destination of the Veronese was Brazil, where large numbers of workers were in demand because of the end of slavery. Between 1886 and 1890 alone 50,000 people left the Verona area, of whom only about 10% remained in Europe. In the same decade 333,000 people left the Veneto region, 11% of the population, but this percentage in the Veronese lowlands rose to as high as 33%. The situation and thoughts of those who were forced to leave were well described by the Veronese poet Berto Barbarani in one of his poems, I va in Merica, which recounts the miseries of the Veneto region at the time and ends with the villagers deciding to leave.

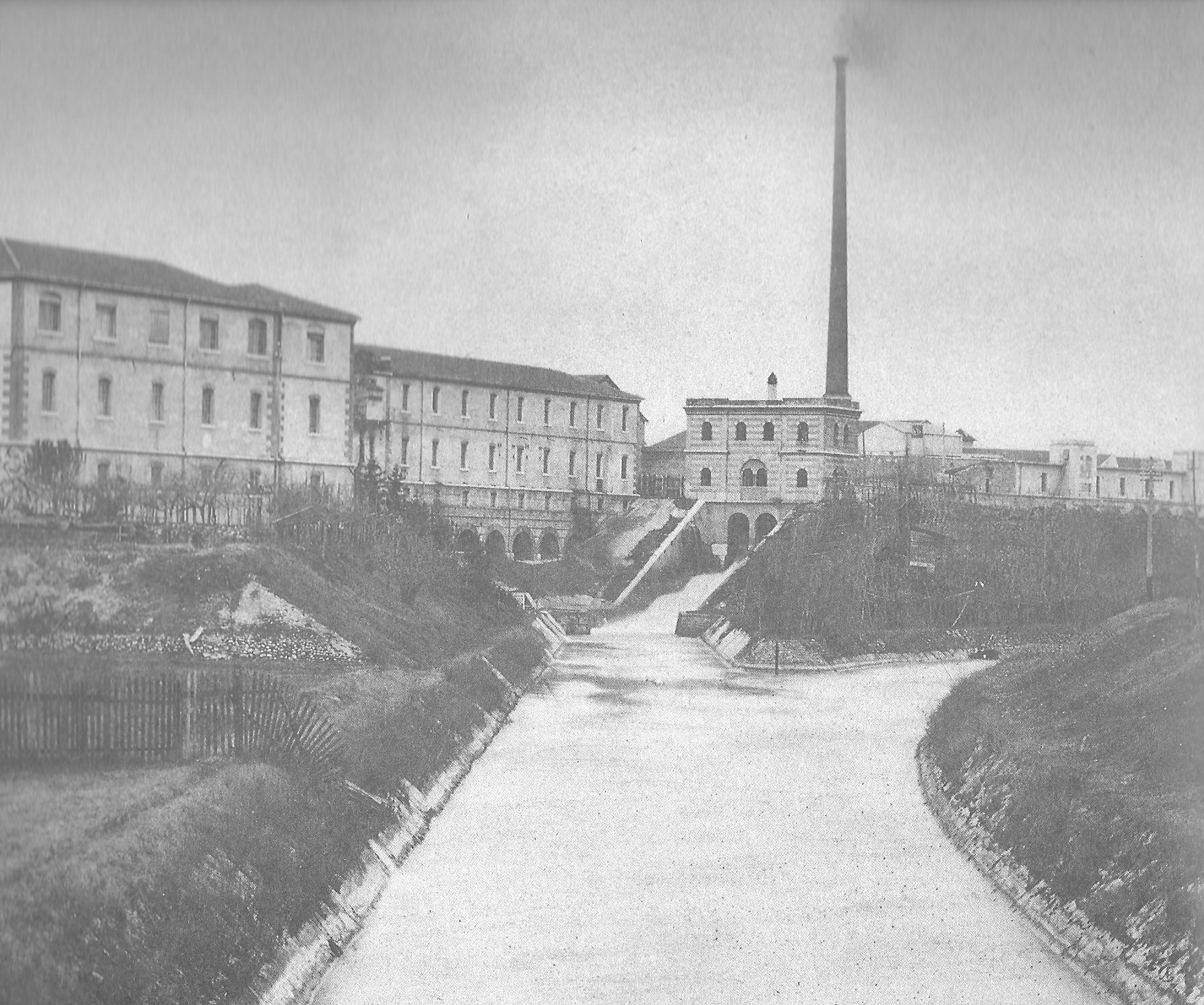
Verona's paper mills and the Camuzzoni canal in the early twentieth century.

The end of the century, however, also saw the gradual growth of industry, particularly after the construction of the Camuzzoni industrial canal (named after the mayor Giulio Camuzzoni), capable of supplying 3,000 horsepower. While up to that point the only industry in Verona was the Porta Vescovo station workshop, due to the supply of that power new industries could begin to establish themselves, so that from 1890 to 1911 the number of workers in the province rose from 8,658 to nearly 20,000.

=== The two world wars ===
During the First World War, the city was hit by a series of aerial attacks, the first of which took place on 14 November 1915, when three black-painted planes dropped numerous bombs on the city: there was a massacre in Piazza delle Erbe, and in the end there were about a hundred dead and wounded. For the first time in the Great War, the city suffered civilian casualties.

In October 1917, after the battle of Caporetto, the situation worsened and Verona officially became a city included in the territory of war operations, so martial law came into effect and civilian trains were suspended. However, the contribution of the Allies was noticeable, which lifted the morale of the population. First French and then American troops arrived, so that in 1918 the American national holiday for the declaration of independence and the French national holiday for the storming of the Bastille were celebrated in Verona within ten days. At the end of October, rumors began to circulate in the city of a victorious Italian offensive, and on 3 November the people of Verona took to the streets to celebrate the victory: the city was once again filled with tricolor flags after 1866.

The rise of Fascism brought great projects to the city, and one of the most important for Verona was the completion of the city walls. These were built with great speed, so much so that work began in early 1935 and was completed in November 1936.

World War II did not involve Verona until 1943. On the night of 25 July, in fact, Mussolini was challenged by Fascist leaders and was then arrested. In Verona the military took power for 45 days, and then Eugenio Gallizioli became mayor of the city and Luigi Messedaglia, a Verona senator, became president of the province. In September, however, the government surrendered, and the Germans began to occupy strategic points and cities in northern Italy. In Verona, the commander of the 8th artillery regiment refused to surrender his weapons and fought the Germans, while numerous clashes took place in the city. With the liberation by the Germans of Mussolini, the Italian Social Republic was formed, and Verona, with the establishment of the most important German military commands and some ministries, became de facto one of its capitals, along with Salò and Milan.

Verona hosted the only Fascist congress in Castelvecchio (where the foundations of the new state, the militarization of the party and socialization were decided) and the Verona Trial, where five of the six accused were sentenced to death.

Verona was one of the most bombed cities because of its strategic position and the presence of many German military commands and five ministries of the RSI; in the end, 45% of the city was destroyed by Allied bombs and the number of victims was also high. The most devastating raids were those of 28 January 1944, when 120 four-engine planes hit the Porta Nuova station area, and of 4 January 1945, when Castelvecchio, the Chapter Library, the Civic Library, and other important monuments were damaged or destroyed. Finally, in April 1945, on the day of their retreat from Verona, the fleeing Germans destroyed all its bridges.

War damages

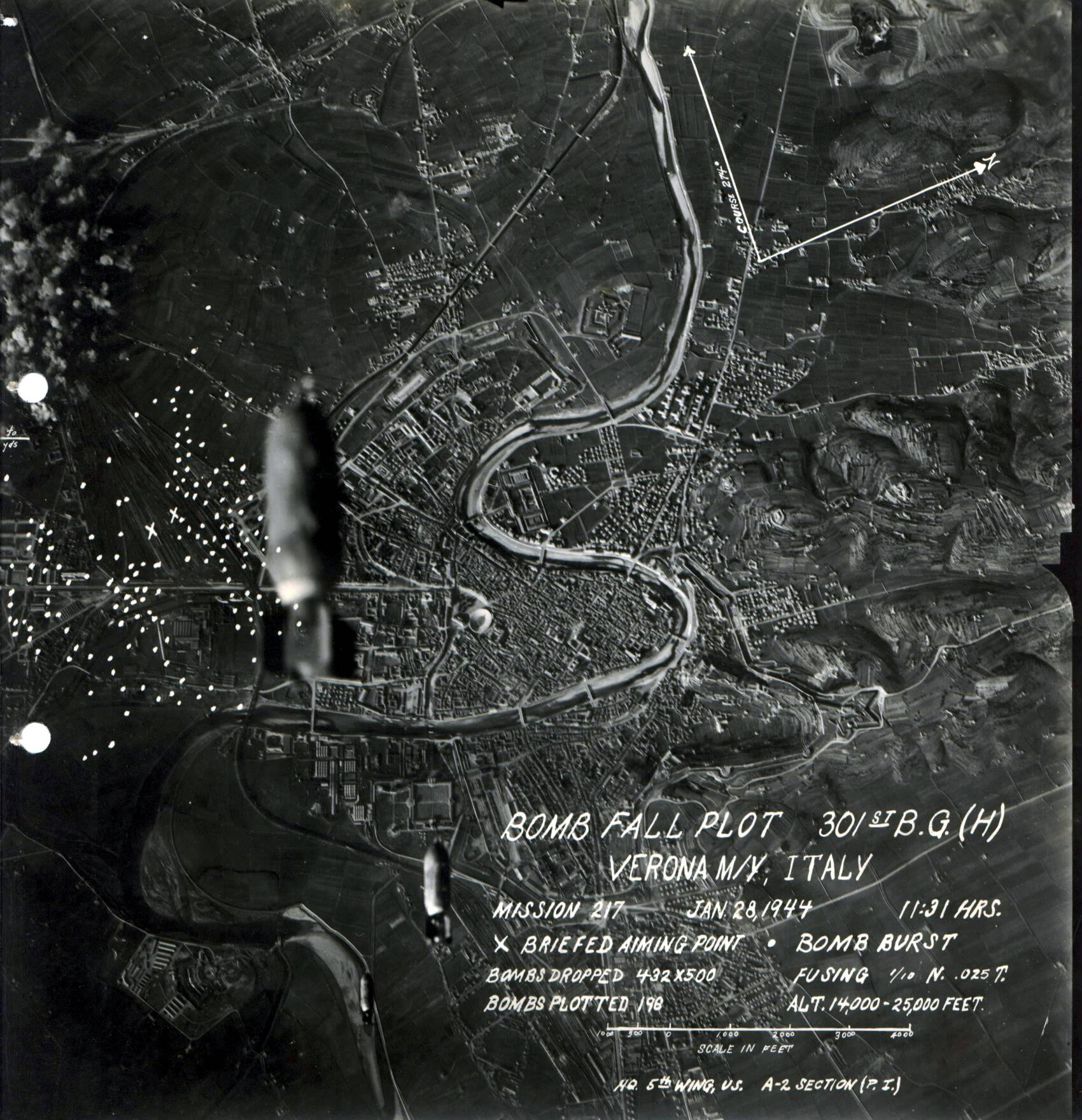
Report of the bombing raid on Verona station on 28 January 1945

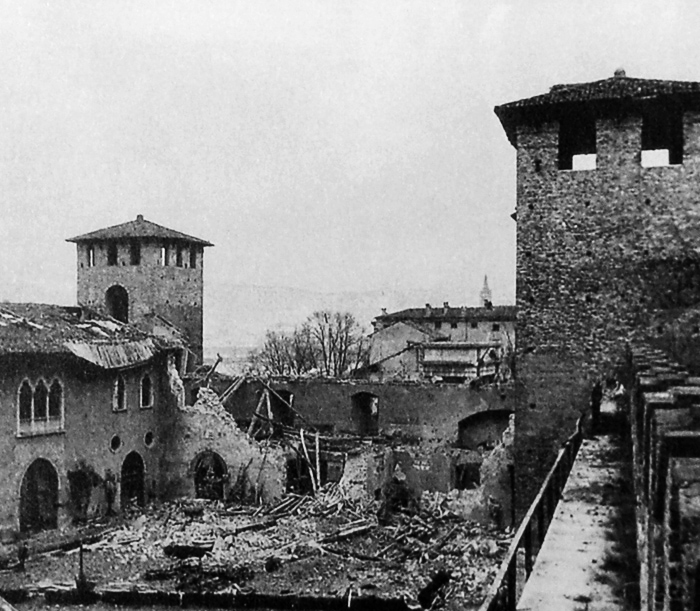
The photo shows the extensive damage to the Castelvecchio.

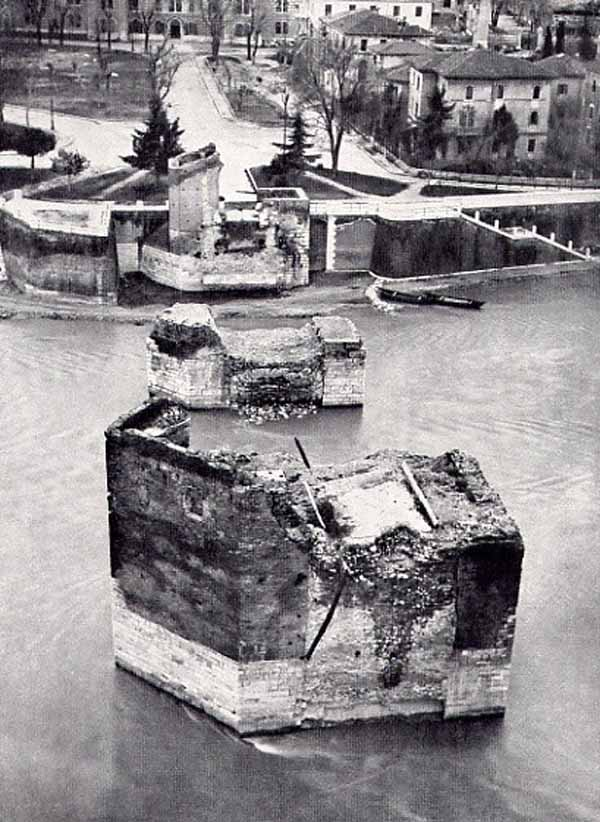
The medieval Scaliger Bridge that was blown up by the retreating Germans.

Verona is one of the cities decorated for military bravery in the War of Liberation, awarded the Gold Medal of Military Valor for the sacrifices of its people and for its activity in the partisan struggle during the Second World War:

A city with millenary traditions of the Risorgimento, though harassed by enemy armies and torn by military operations, in the course of bloody battles and during periods of servitude, in 20 months of partisan struggle. Verona, with the blood of its best sons, in prisons and on scaffolds, testified to its indomitable spirit of freedom, heroically supported by people of all social classes and ideally united with those fellow citizens who, on 8 September 1943, had joined the local resistance in France, Greece, Albania and Yugoslavia. The activities of the National Liberation Committee revived the guerrilla actions in such a way as to arouse the surveillance and espionage of the various police forces, so much so that, an exceptional fact of the liberation struggle in Italy, one by one its members, between July and October 1944, were captured, tortured and sent to the various death camps, from which they did not return. On 17 July 1944 a group of partisans entered the "Scalzi" prison to free the leaders of the national anti-fascist movement. The bloodshed, the bombings, the persecutions and the destruction of entire villages, both on the plain and in the pre-alpine valleys, did not diminish but rather strengthened the struggle of the people of Verona, worthy protagonists of the Second Italian Risorgimento.

— Verona, September 1943 - April 1945

=== Contemporary Verona ===
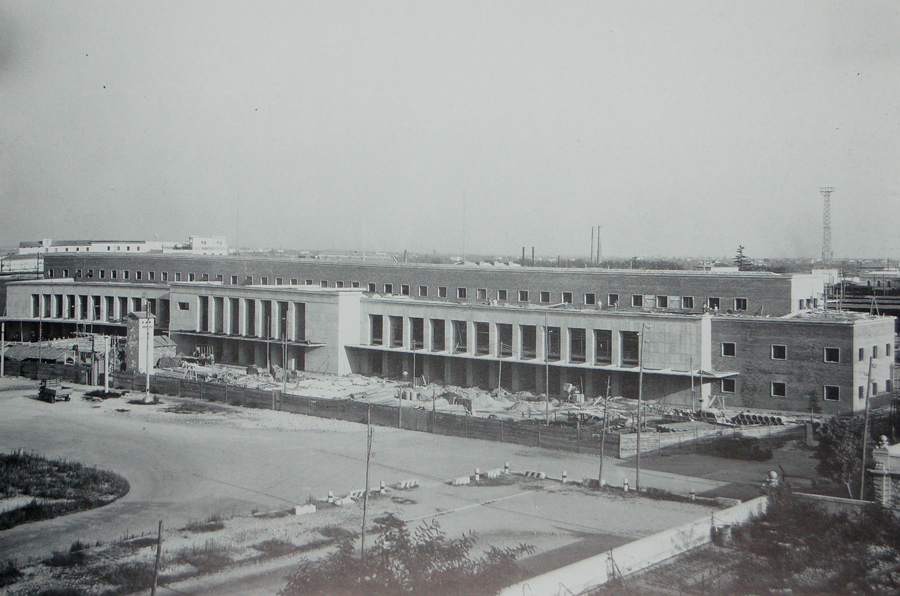
The station of Porta Nuova at the end of the reconstruction works in 1949.

With the end of the war, the conditions for the reconstruction were also created: the first intervention was the demolition of the anti-aircraft defenses installed in the Arena, used by the citizens to protect themselves during the bombing raids. The decree of 1 March 1945 stipulated that all cities severely damaged by the wars should have a reconstruction plan, and Verona, with 11,627 buildings completely destroyed and 8,347 severely damaged, was one of them. Work began immediately to rebuild all the bridges, the ancient churches and the Porta Nuova railway station. In record time, in August 1946, the Catena Bridge was reopened, while the ancient Castelvecchio Bridge and the Ponte Pietra were reassembled and restored largely with the original materials collected from the riverbed. The construction technique used was similar to the original one, so the work took a long time: the former was finished in 1951, the latter in 1959.

Between the 1950s and 1960s, Verona was also part of the Italian economic miracle, a period in which the mayor was Giorgio Zanotto, a Christian Democrat. The economy underwent a radical change, with a significant shift of the workforce from agricultural activities to industry; in addition, the Standa department store was opened in the city center in 1956, and two years later the Mondadori factory was inaugurated in San Michele Extra. Several variants of the 1957 master plan reshaped the city, creating new districts and streets, and the population grew rapidly, from 190,856 registered on 1 January 1956 to 248,945 ten years later. The increase in the number of private cars led to the abandonment of the Verona-Caprino-Garda railway, the Verona-Grezzana tramway and the Verona-Caldiero-San Bonifacio, while in the mid-1960s the Verona-Brescia section of the Serenissima freeway was inaugurated. The population growth and the increase in the number of students led to the opening of numerous schools of all levels. The Ospedale Civile Maggiore was expanded with the introduction of new advanced departments, while in June 1963 the construction of the Giambattista Rossi Polyclinic began.

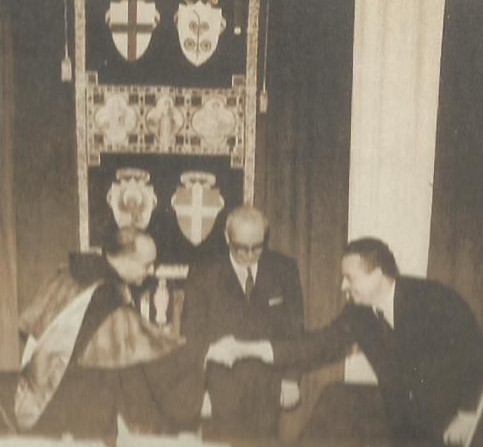
12 November 1965: Inauguration of the University of Verona by the Minister Luigi Gui, the Rector Guido Ferro and the Mayor of Verona Renato Gozzi.

On 10 January 1959 the University of Verona was founded with the name Free University of Economics and Business. Following the merger with the University of Padua, the Faculty of Foreign Languages and Literatures, the Faculty of Canon Law and the Faculty of Medicine were added. In 1982 the University of Verona again became an autonomous body and today has several faculties: Economics, Medicine and Surgery, Mathematics, Physical and Natural Sciences, Law, Education, Letters and Philosophy, Foreign Languages and Literatures, and Physical Education. Today Verona is the third university centre in the Veneto region, after Padua and Venice.

A major news event was the kidnapping of General James Lee Dozier, commander of NATO's Allied Land Forces Southern Europe (LANDSOUTH), who was abducted by the Red Brigades on 17 December 1981; the police intervened massively, so much so that the city seemed to be under siege, and only after 42 days, on 28 January, he was freed in Padua thanks to a raid by the Verona NOCS. In 1988 the city was visited by Pope John Paul II, who celebrated in the Cathedral the beatification of Don Giovanni Calabria and Don Giuseppe Nascimbeni, both from the Verona area. The city hosted the 2026 Winter Olympics closing ceremonies and the 2026 Winter Paralympics opening ceremonies.

== Jews in Verona ==
Verona has one of the oldest and most important Jewish communities in Italy. Clear traces of this presence remain: in the buildings of the old ghetto, in the synagogue and in the ancient cemetery of Borgo Venezia. Additionally, there is a 20th-century synagogue located outside but close to the original Jewish ghetto.

== See also ==
- Monuments of Verona
- March of Verona
- Scaliger
- Timeline of Verona
- Roman Catholic Diocese of Verona
- History of Italy

== Bibliography ==
- Agnoli, Francesco Mario (1998). Le Pasque veronesi: quando Verona insorse contro Napoleone. Rimini: Il Cerchio. ISBN 88-86583-47-8.
- Aspes, Alessandra (1984). Il Veneto nell'antichità: preistoria e protostoria. Verona: Banca Popolare di Verona.
- Baldissin Molli, Giovanna (2007). Verona. Verona: Banco Popolare.
- Bodini, Paola (2005). Lessinia. Bosco Chiesanuova: CTG Lessinia.
- Bognetti, Gian Piero (1959). Teodorico di Verona e Verona longobarda capitale di regno. Padova: Cedam.
- Buchi, Ezio; Cavalieri Manasse, Giuliana (1987). Il Veneto nell'età romana: Note di urbanistica e di archeologia del territorio. Verona: Banca Popolare di Verona.
- Carrara, Mario (1966). Gli Scaligeri. Varese: Dell'Oglio.
- Castagnetti, Andrea; Varanini, Gian Maria (1989). Il Veneto nel medioevo: dalla "Venetia" alla Marca veronese. Verona: Banca Popolare di Verona.
- Castagnetti, Andrea (1991). Le città della Marca Veronese. Verona: Libreria Universitaria Editrice.
- Cenni, Nino (1973). La Verona di ieri. Verona: Cassa di Risparmio di Verona Vicenza e Belluno.
- Conforti Calcagni, Annamaria (1999). Le mura di Verona. Verona: Cierre. ISBN 978-88-8314-008-2.
- Da Lisca, Alessandro (1941). La basilica di San Zenone in Verona. Verona: Scuola Tipogafica Don Bosco.
- Dallapiazza, Michael (2015). Storia della letteratura tedesca. Dal Medioevo al Barocco. Bari: Laterza. ISBN 978-88-581-2155-9.
- da Persico, Giovanni Battista (1838). Verona e la sua Provincia, nuovamente descritte. Verona: presso Francesco Pollidi.
- Gillett, Andrew (2003). Envoys and Political Communication in the Late Antique West, 411-533. Cambridge University Press. ISBN 0-521-81349-2.
- Jacobacci, Vittorio (1980). La piazzaforte di Verona sotto la dominazione austriaca 1814-1866. Verona: Cassa di Risparmio di Verona Vicenza e Belluno.
- Livy. Ab Urbe condita.
- Maffei, Antonio. Memorie della Rivoluzione di Verona nel 1797.
- Muratori, Ludovico Antonio (1762). Annali d'Italia. Vol. 3. Monaco: Stamperia Olzati.
- Pavoncello, Nello (1960). Gli ebrei in Verona dalle origini al secolo XX. Verona.
- Pellegrini, Marco (2009). Le guerre d'Italia: 1494-1530. Bologna: Il mulino. ISBN 978-88-15-13046-4.
- Pliny the Elder. Naturalis historia.
- Plutarch. De fortuna Romanorum.
- Priante, Giovanni (2006). L'Arena e Verona: 140 anni di storia. Verona: Athesis.
- Ravegnani, Giorgio (2004). I Bizantini in Italia. Mulino. ISBN 88-15-09690-6.
- Sandrini, Arturo; Brugnoli, Pierpaolo (1988). Architettura a Verona nell'età della Serenissima. Verona: Banca popolare di Verona.
- Simeoni, Luigi (1959). Studi su Verona nel medioevo. Vol. I. Verona.
- Solinas, Giovanni (1981). Storia di Verona. Verona: Centro RinasHarvtxt.
- Stella, Gianfranco (1993). Storia illustrata di Verona. Verona: S.OE.DE.
- Varanini, Gian Maria (1988). Gli Scaligeri 1277-1387. Milano: Arnoldo Mondadori Editore.
- Vecchiato, Francesco (2000). Verona nel Novecento. Verona: I.E.T. Edizioni.
- Zalin, Giovanni (2001). Storia di Verona. Caratteri, aspetti, momenti. Vicenza: Neri Pozza. ISBN 88-7305-823-X.

City statutes

- Liechtenstein, Hermann (1475). Leges et statuta Veronae. Vicenza.
- Statuta magnificae civitatis Veronae.
- Documenti statutari veronesi dei secoli XIII e XIV riguardanti la saltaria.
- Ordini et regole per il Foro della città di Verona.
- Raccolta di parti, ducali, provvisioni, ordini, decreti, terminazioni, giudizi, suffragi, deliberazioni a favore dell'Arte degli speziali di Verona.
- Statuti, ordini e parti, con altre pubbliche scritture e terminazioni concernenti il beneficio e il buon governo del territorio veronese.
- Leggi, e capitoli per il buon governo dell'arte calderari di Verona. Verona: Domenico Carattoni. 1788.
- Terminazione dei revisori regolatori dell'entrade pubbliche in proposito delli dazj carni della città, e sottoborghi di Verona.
- Cipolla, Carlo (1890). Statuti rurali veronesi. Vol. 1. Venezia: Fratelli Visentini.
- Faldoni, Giovanni Antonio (1728). Liber juris civilis urbis Veronae. Verona: Pierantonio Berno.
- Sandri, Gino (1940). Gli statuti veronesi del 1276 - colle correzioni e le aggiunte fino al 1323. Venezia: Deputazione di storia patria per le Venezie.
- Simeoni, Luigi (1914). Gli antichi statuti delle arti veronesi secondo la revisione scaligera del 1319. Venezia: Tipografia Emiliana.
