= Vasari Sacristy =

Room in a church in Naples

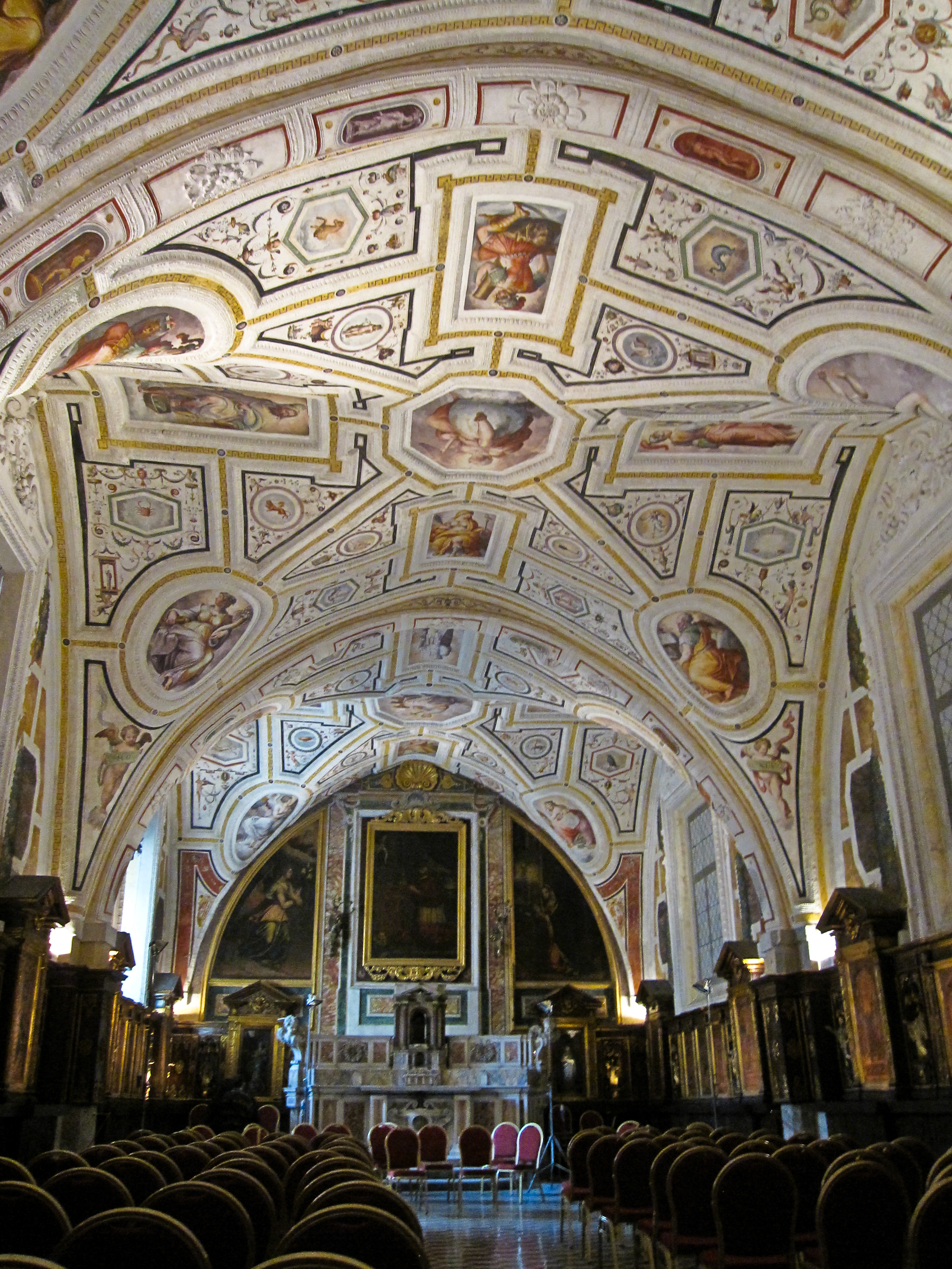
Interior

The Vasari Sacristy (Italian - Sacrestia del Vasari) or Old Sacristy (Italian - Sacrestia Vecchia) is a room in Sant'Anna dei Lombardi, Naples, Italy, one of its two sacristies. It was the refectory of the Olivetan monastery of Santa Maria di Monteoliveto until 1688, when it was converted to its current role. The conversion in 1688 revealed 15th century inlays by Fra Giovanni da Verona, also to be seen in the church's Tolosa Chapel. The church was renamed Sant'Anna dei Lombardi in 1805.

An Adoration of the Shepherds by a follower of Vasari was moved to its present position above the door in the counter-facade during the 17th century. The two side lunettes contain sculptures of the archangel Gabriel and the Virgin Mary, attributed to Giovan Battista Cavagna and resting on two marble lavabos leaning against the walls.

The central nave vault is divided into three quadrants, showing personifications of Faith, Religion and Eternity It is accompanied along the walls by 17th century furniture decorated with a cycle of precious wooden inlays by Fra Giovanni da Verona dating to 1506 (the third cycle after those of Santa Maria in Organo in Verona and the Territorial Abbey of Monte Oliveto Maggiore near Asciano) with views of the city and scenes of life in the Olivetan order. Between the inlays are niches with wooden statues showing saints relating to the Olivetans. Behind the altar is a painting of Carlo Borromeo by Girolamo d'Arena, which had hung in the original church of Sant'Anna dei Lombardi (which had also been dedicated to St Carlo Borromeo) but was moved to its present location after that church was destroyed in the 1805 earthquake. Either side are two paintings of Michael the Archangel and the Virgin Mary.

== History ==
It is named after Giorgio Vasari who in 1545 painted its vault frescoes, whilst it was still a refectory. His fame had reached Naples due to his 1542-44 works in Rome and due to his capacity to complete commissions quickly. His time in Campania from 1544 to 1545 was short but busy and brought Tuscan Mannerism (which had previously only reached as far as Rome) to Naples. He received several commissions from viceroy don Pedro da Toledo, from noblemen and from monasteries, the first of which was to decorate the old refectory of the monastery next to Santa Maria di Monteoliveto.

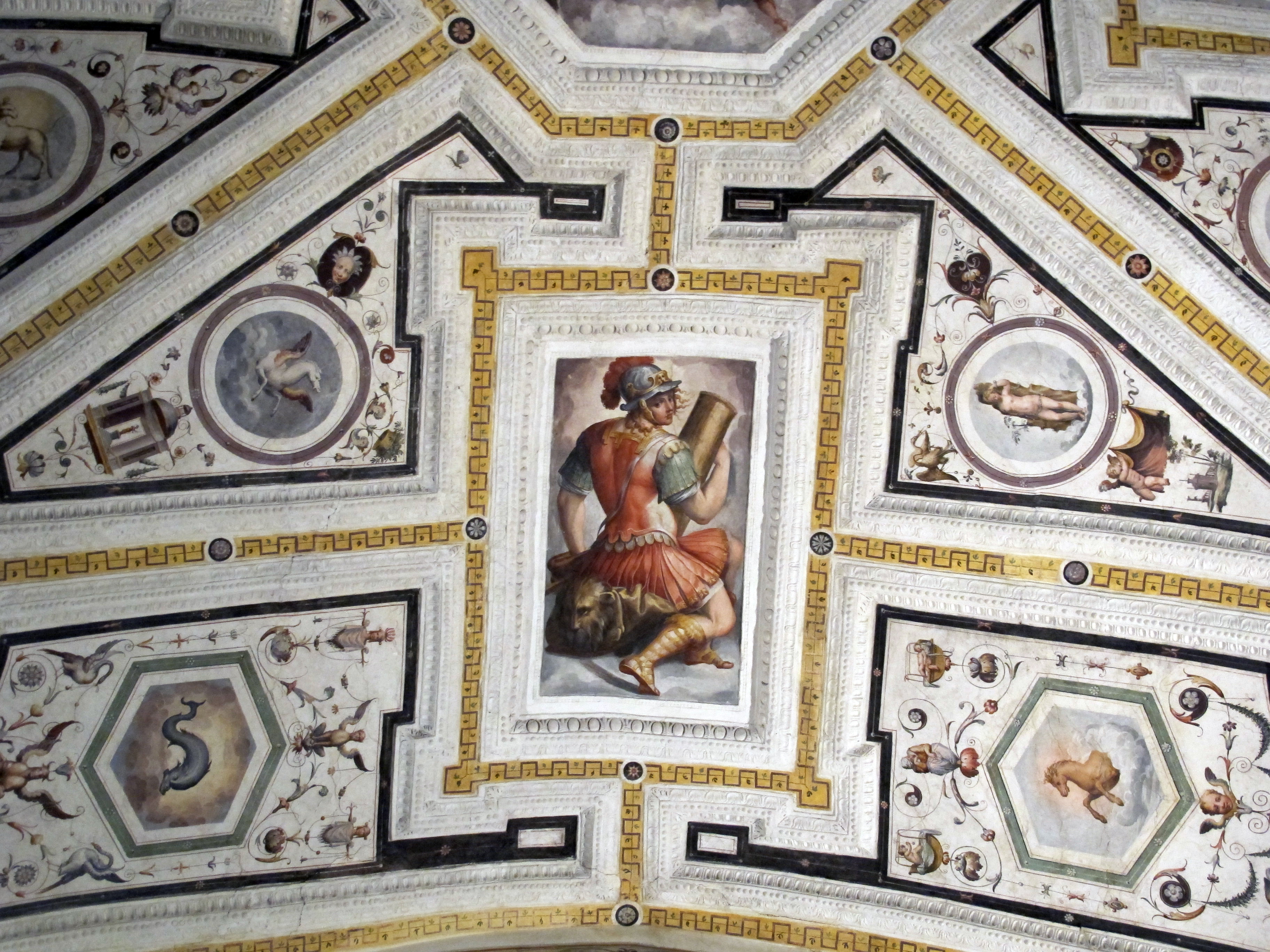
Detail of a vault

He almost refused it due to the space's Gothic architecture, which he felt might be too dark to show off his style to best effect. He decided to take it, however, and plastered the vaults, brightening the space and giving him extra space to paint. Some of the figures were painted from Vasari's drawings by Raffaellino del Colle, whilst Stefano Veltroni and others assisted with the purely decorative areas. Whilst painting the frescoes Vasari also produced two triptychs, one for the room's counter-facade and one for its back wall, showing The Manna from Heaven and The Feast in the House of Simon, now in the Museo nazionale di Capodimonte and Museo Diocesano di Napoli.

== Bibliography (in Italian) ==
- AA.VV., Vasari a Napoli, Paparo Edizioni (2011)
- Cesare Cundari, Arnaldo Venditti, Il complesso di Monteoliveto, Gangemi, 1999
- D'Ambrosio P., La chiesa di Monteoliveto (1952)
