= Fountain of Monteoliveto =

Fountain in Naples, Italy

Coordinates: 40.845400°N 14.250830°E

The Fountain of Monteoliveto (Fontana di Monteoliveto) is a late-Baroque monumental fountain in central Naples, Italy. It is also called the Fountain of Charles II or of the Small King (del Re Piccolo).

== History ==
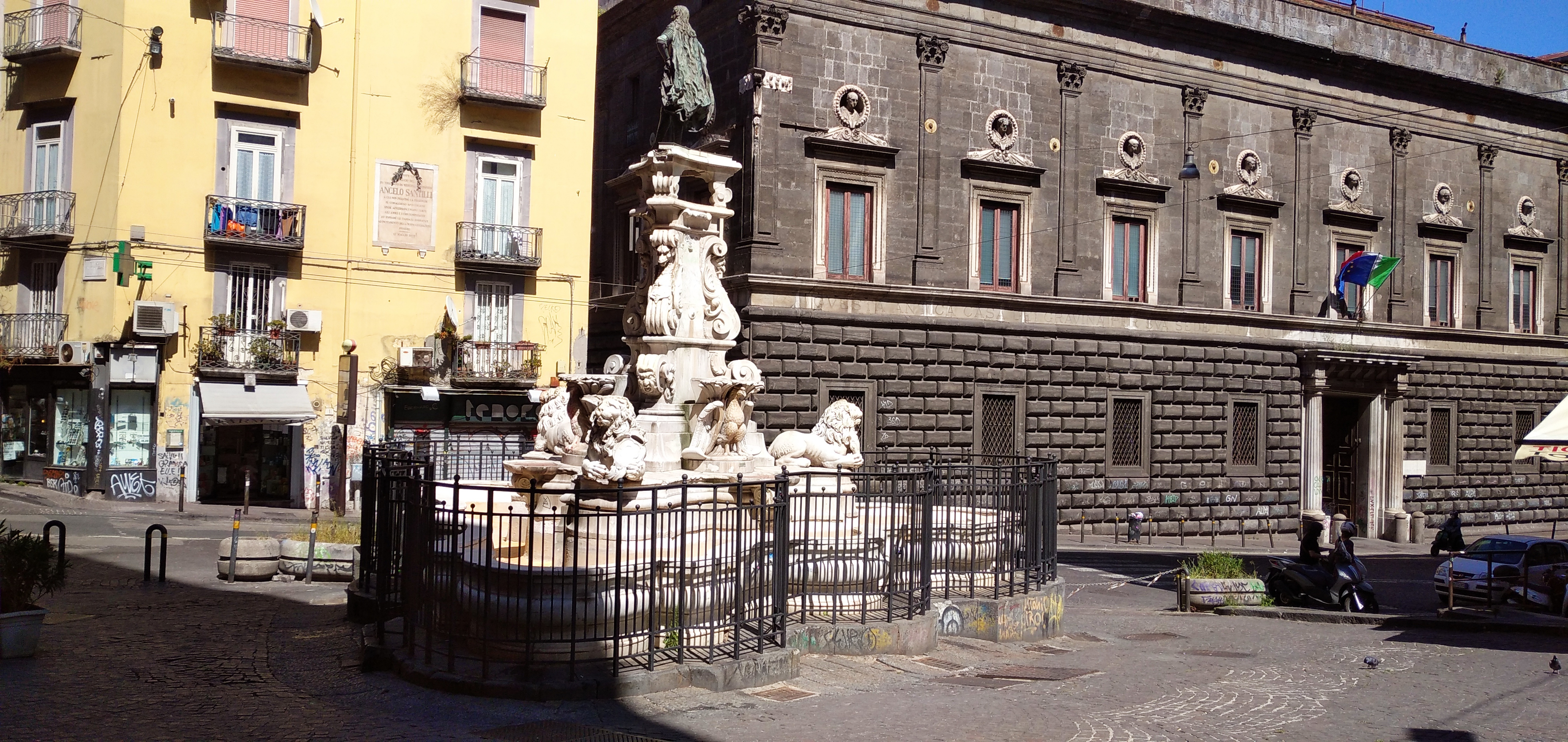
Fontana di Monteoliveto

Many architects and stonemasons had worked on the initial waterworks, which was flowing by the 1660s. The central statuary complex was commissioned by the viceroy Pedro Antonio de Aragón and completed in 1699 based on designs by the architect Cosimo Fanzago. Atop stands a bronze statue of Charles II of Spain. The fountain is located in Piazza Monteoliveto, also called piazzetta Trinità Maggiore, unto which faces the church of Sant'Anna dei Lombardi (which was attached to the Olivetan Monastery of Monte Oliveto. Across the street is the Renaissance palace of Orsini di Gravina. From the street side of the fountain, looking northwest, one can see the sculptural Guglia dell’Immacolata (Spire of the Immaculate Conception) in the Piazza of the Gesù Nuovo and the Convent of Santa Chiara. Another contemporary fountain in Naples would the Fountain of Neptune (Italian: Fontana del Nettuno) presently located a few blocks south in Via Medina, in Naples, Italy.
