= Veltroni =

Veltroni is an Italian surname. Notable people with the surname include:

- Stefano Veltroni (16th century), Italian Renaissance painter
- Walter Veltroni (born 1955), Italian writer, film director, journalist, and politician
