= Sebastiano Schiavone da Rovigno =

Venetian woodcarver

Sebastiano Schiavone da Rovigno (literally: Sebastian the Slav from Rovigno) also known as Sebastiano Schiavone and Sebastiano da Rovigno, Bastian Virgola and nicknamed Zoppo (literally, lame) (1420 – 1505) was a woodcarver and marquetry artist from Rovigno (today Rovinj, Croatia) in the Republic of Venice.

== Biography ==
He was born in Rovigno (today Rovinj, Croatia) in the Republic of Venice. While his name literally means "the Slav" and his origins are unknown, it has been argued that he was in fact Italian, since all people from "the other side of the water" were scornfully called as such (schiavoni) by Venetians. He joined the Dominican Order and in 1461 the Olivetans. Sebastian took abode in many monasteries across Italy during the 15th century, working in several monasteries located in important Italian arts towns.

He was a master to fellow friar and woodcarver Fra Giovanni da Verona. Sebastian taught Giovanni the art of woodwork in the monastery of San Giorgio in Ferrara.

He was the founder of an important Olivetan school of woodcarvers in Ferrara. Sebastian artistically contributed to the city of Ferrara with what he had learned from his sojourns in other important Italian cities such as Siena and Ferrara.

He is also said to have worked in the convent of Santa Maria in Organo with Giovanni. He also worked with an Antonio and a Paolo (from Mantua) and with the master Bernardino Ferrando from Bergamo. He was active in the Renaissance period, and his style was influenced by Pietro Lombardo.

One of his most famous works are the 34 choir seats he made for the convent Sant'Elena in Venice, which was affiliated with the Olivetani order. Some of them are in St Mark's Basilica. He worked on the old sacristy in St Mark together with Lorenzo Canozi of Lendinara in 1450.

Most of his work was dispersed. Because of this, it is difficult to determine how much influence he had on his pupil Giovanni da Verona.

== Bibliography ==
- Paolo Tedeschi: Fra Sebastiano Schiavone da Rovigno intarsiatore del secolo XV
- Antonio Alisi, Istria, città minori, Trieste, 1997.
- M. Ferretti, I maestri della prospettiva, in Storia dell'arte italiana, XI, Torino 1982, ad indicem
