= Houston Cinema Arts Festival =

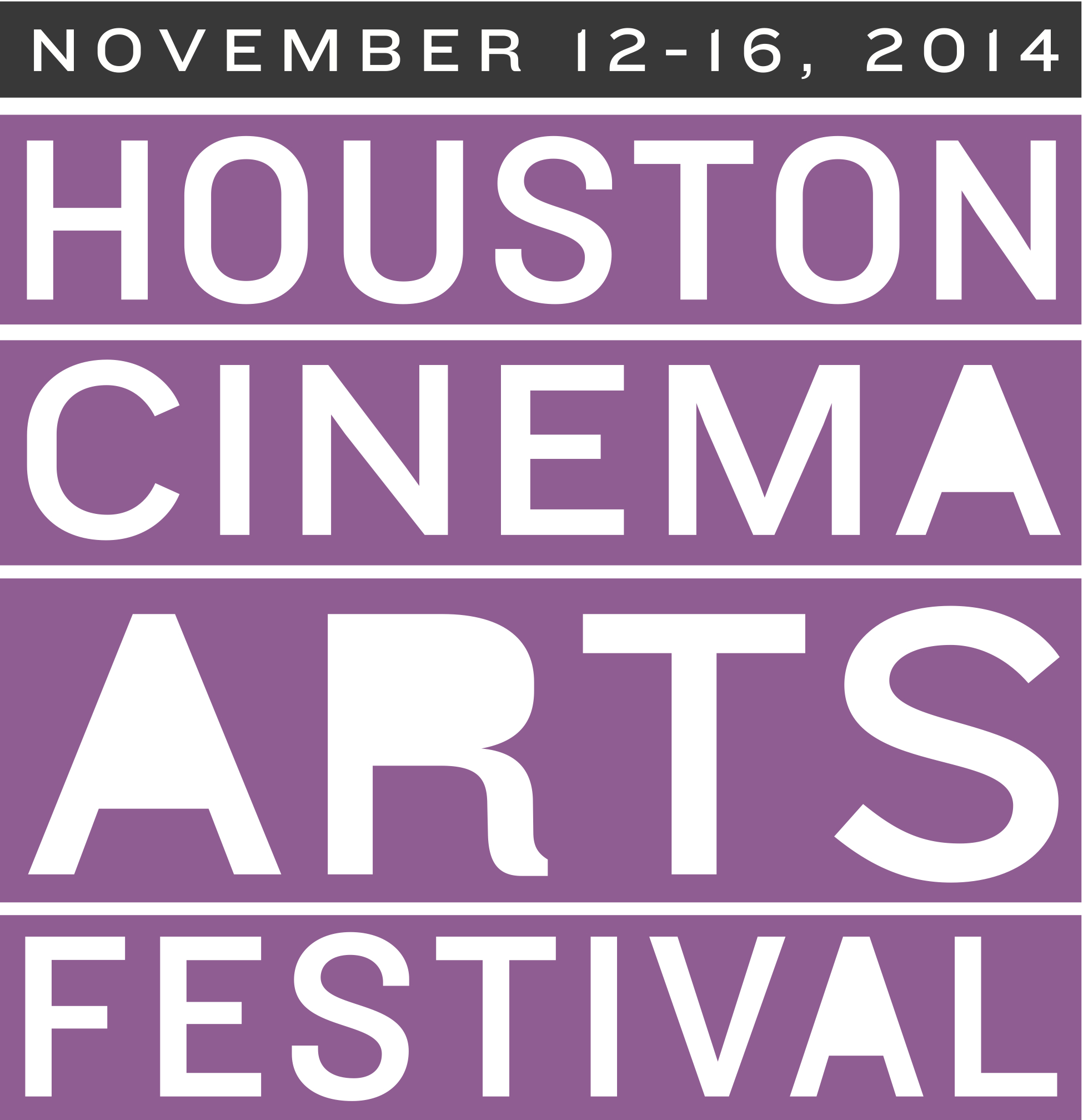
- 2014 logo
- Location: Houston, Texas, United States
- Hosted by: Houston Cinema Arts Society
- No. of films: 50+ screened
- Website: https://www.cinemahtx.org/

The Houston Cinema Arts Festival (HCAF) is a five-day annual film festival held every November in Houston, Texas. The Festival is presented by Houston Cinema Arts Society (HCAS).

== History ==
The Houston Cinema Arts Festival (HCAF) was first introduced in 2008 as a weekend film festival at the Museum of Fine Arts, Houston and Rice University Media Center. HCAS launched its inaugural five-day film festival in 2009 in Houston, Texas. The Festival's unique focus on films “by and about artists” accomplished two goals: It filled a niche in the broader film festival world that was sorely underrepresented, and it identified Houston, internationally, as a thriving arts town that celebrates innovative films, media installations and performances. The original name of the Festival was Cinema Arts Festival Houston through 2011 and was renamed Houston Cinema Arts Festival starting in November 2012.

== Events ==
The Houston Cinema Arts Festival is the most ambitious of the Houston Cinema Arts Society programs. This five-day, multi-venue festival includes over 50 narrative and documentary films, film premieres, an interactive video installation gallery, 16mm screening room, live multimedia performances, panel discussions, Meet the Makers workshops, and free outdoor and student field trip screenings. In its relatively short history, HCAS has brought notable guest artists, such as Tilda Swinton, Alex Gibney, Guillermo Arriaga, Isabella Rossellini, John Turturro, Shirley MacLaine, Richard Linklater, Zlatko Topčić, Ethan Hawke, Fisher Stevens, Robert Redford, Tracy Letts, Will Forte, Barbara Hammer, Jonas Mekas, and Thomas Haden Church among many others, to the Festival.

== Levantine Films Cinema Arts Award ==
The Levantine Films Cinema Arts Award honors a leading actor, director, or other creative artist who has stretched the boundaries of cinematic expression throughout an illustrious film career. The presentation of the award is usually accompanied by a gala screening of a new or classic work followed by an on-stage interview with the artist. Levantine Films Cinema Arts Awards recipients include Isabella Rossellini, Ethan Hawke, Robert Redford, and Richard Linklater.
