= Giuseppe Vaccaro =

Italian architect (1896–1970)

Giuseppe Vaccaro (Bologna, 30 April 1896 – Rome, 11 September 1970) was an Italian architect.

== Life and career ==
Born in Bologna on 30 April 1896, Vaccaro graduated from the city's Academy of Fine Arts. He later worked as an assistant to Attilio Muggia. One of his earliest works was the design of the Palazzo delle Poste in Naples. Much of his work was in a Rationalist style. Notable examples include the Casa del Fascio in Vergato, the Ex-Cooperativa tra Invalidi e Mutilati di Guerra in Bologna (1929) and the Faculty of Engineering in Bologna (1931-35).

Vaccaro was one of the architects chosen to submit an urban plan for Italian-occupied Addis Ababa. He also worked on plans for the EUR district of Rome and, together with Gino Franzi, was one of the finalists in the competition to design the Anıtkabir - the mausoloeum of Mustafa Kemal Ataturk in Ankara.

He remained a popular architect after the War. One of his first commissions was the reconstruction of the historical center of Alfonsine. One of his most notable post-War projects was the Train of Barca in Bologna.

He died in 1970.
