= Palazzo della Casa del Mutilato, Naples =

Coordinates: 40.842622°N 14.250944°E

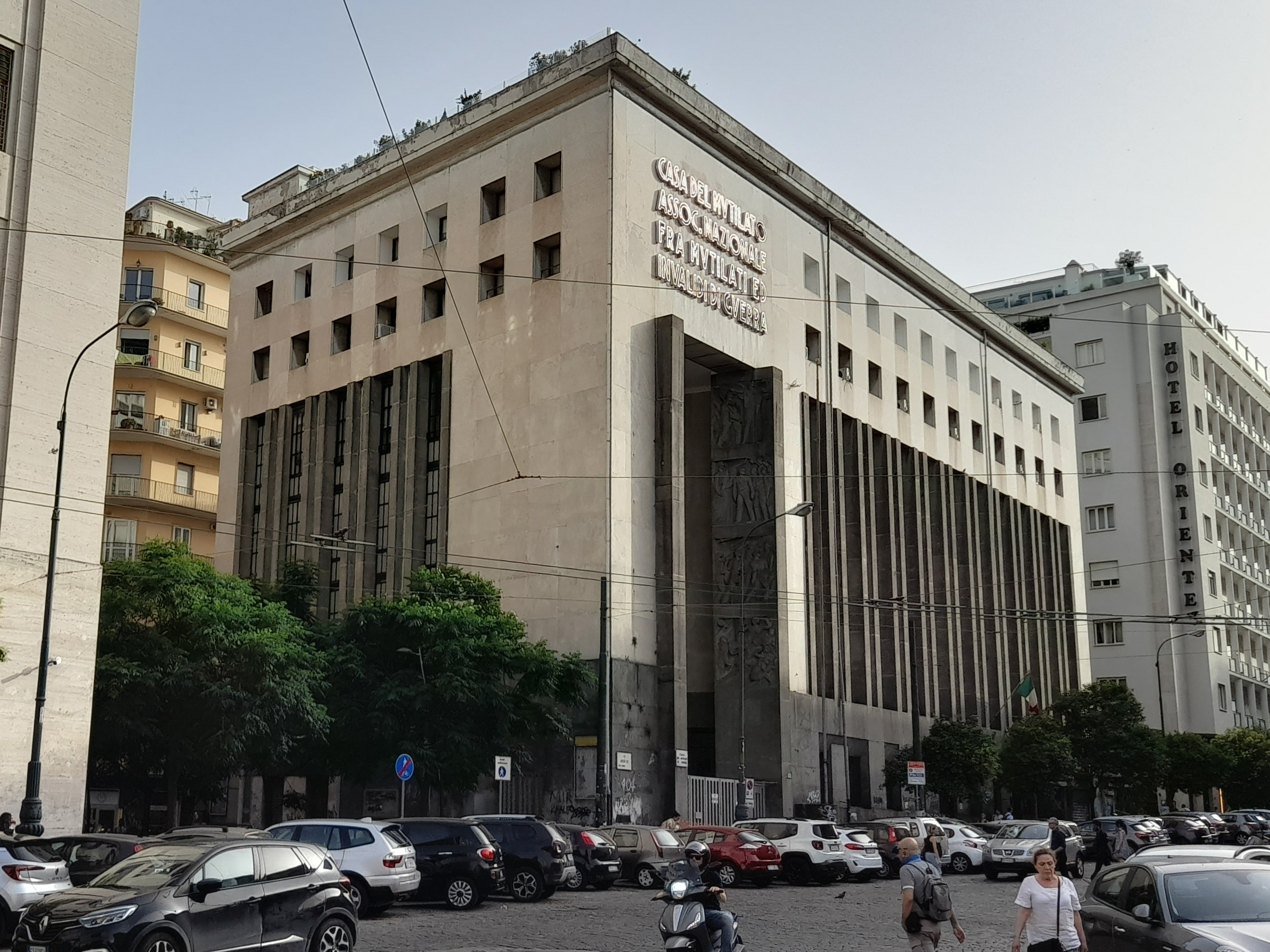
Casa del mutilato

The Palazzo della Casa del Mutilato (Palace of the House of the Mutilated) is a building, located on via Guantai Nuovi and via Diaz, in piazza Matteotti in Naples, Italy. It is an example of the Fascist architecture constructed during the rule of Benito Mussolini, just like the large convex-facade of the central post office building (Palazzo delle Poste) across the street.

The Casa del Mutilato building was constructed from 1938 to 1940 for the Associazione Nazionale fra Mutilati ed Invalidi di Guerra (National Association of Soldiers Mutilated and Invalid from War). It was inaugurated after the start of the second world war. The building design was commissioned from Camillo Guerra.

The predilection of the word Mutilato as opposed to invalidi (invalid) or feriti (wounded) or offeso (injured) is not lacking of connotation. It is true that amputation or unrepairable injuries were more common during the first world war than our present conflicts, and thus the residual observations of the wounded included "mutilated" individuals, however, there was a fascist attachment to Gabrielle D'Annunzio historical assessment of the results of the 1919 Paris Peace Conference for Italy as a Vittoria Mutilata (Mutilated victory), and that this idea fueled the rise of nationalism. Thus the term "mutilato" would have had more positive resonance to the followers of fascism. Multiple such Casa del Mutilato were established in Italy to service the thousands of wounded soldiers.

The exterior is modern and stern in its predominance of stone. The entrance at the corner has a frame of stone panels, sculpted by Vico Consorti and Giuseppe Pellegrini. The atrium has a monumental entry staircase surmounted by a statue of Victory. The interior still contains decorations that recall the fascist party. Similar office buildings were built during the Mussolini era in Milan and Ravenna.
