= Santa Maria degli Angeli, Busseto =

Church building in Busseto, Italy

Santa Maria degli Angeli is a Gothic-style, Roman Catholic church located on Via Provesi #39 in Busseto, region of Emilia-Romagna, Italy.

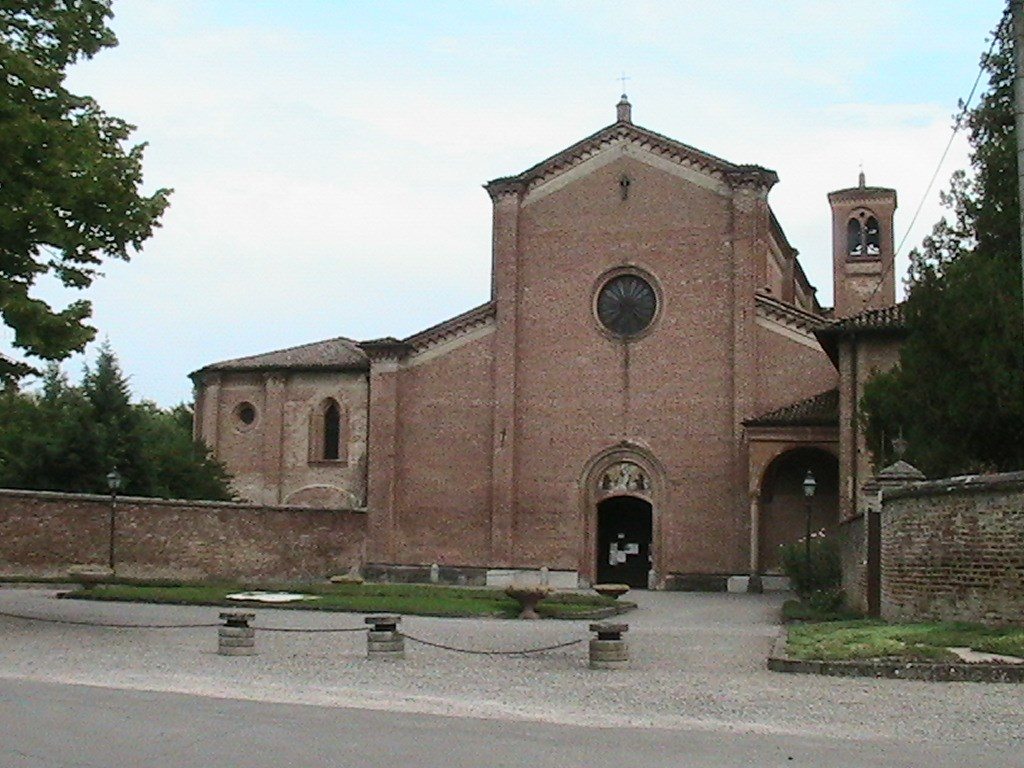
Facade of church

== History ==
The church and the adjacent Franciscan convent were erected between 1470 and 1474, under the patronage of the Pallavicini. Inside, in a rocaille Niche is sheltered the terracotta statues of Grieving over the Dead Christ (1476–77) by Guido Mazzoni.

Other works are a Deposition (circa 1543-44) by Nicolò dell'Abate and a Madonna and Franciscan Saints (1580 cc) by Antonio Campi.

The convent was suppressed in 1810, but reopened in 1816.
