= Alfonsine =

- Comune
- Comune di Alfonsine
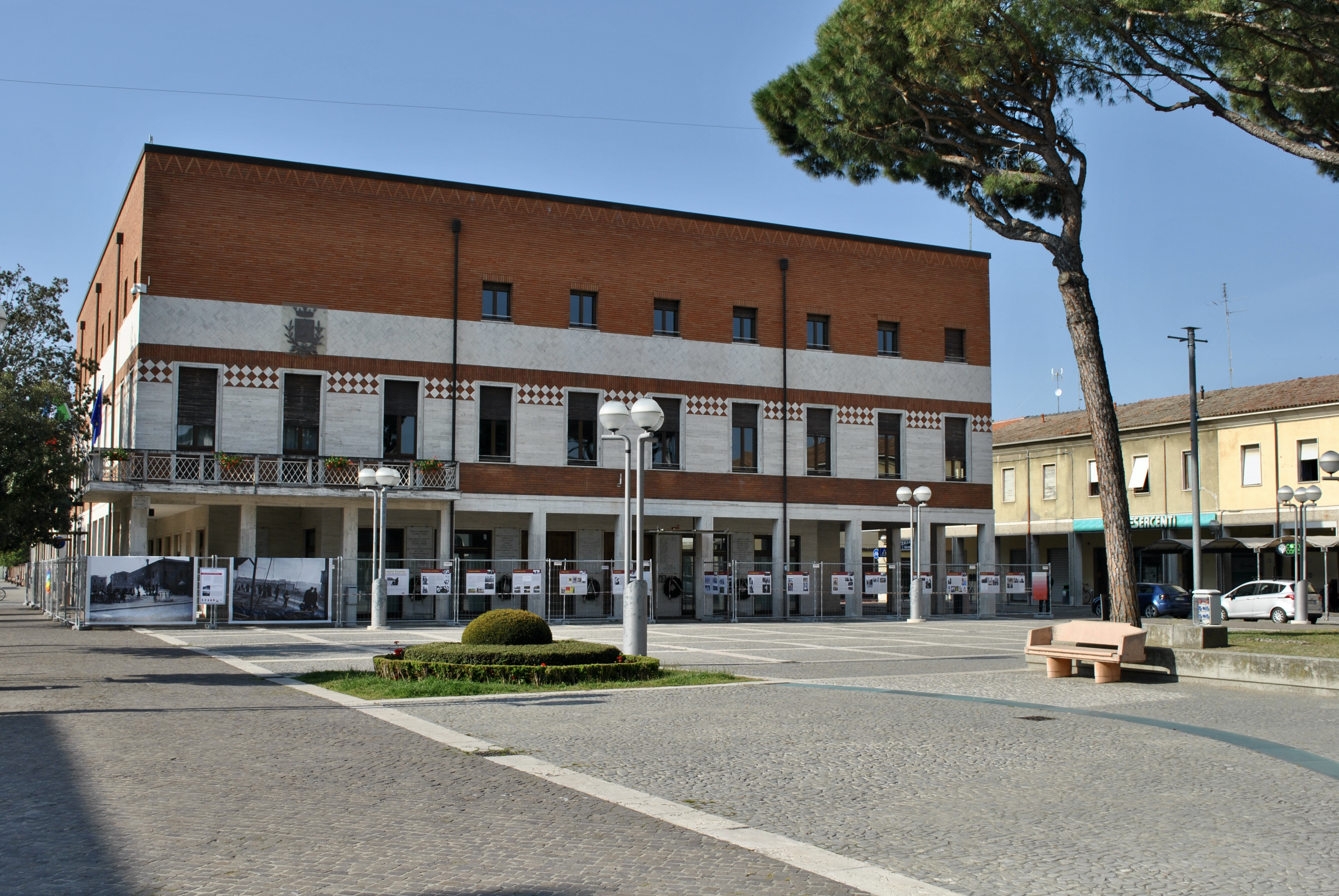
- Alfonsine

- Coat of arms

- Location of Alfonsine in Italy Alfonsine (Emilia-Romagna)
- Coordinates: 44°30′N 12°3′E
- Country: Italy
- Region: Emilia-Romagna
- Province: Ravenna (RA)
- Frazioni: Fiumazzo, Taglio Corelli, Villa Pianta, Filo, Longastrino, Borgo Gallina, Borgo Seganti

Government
  - Mayor: Riccardo Graziani

Area
  - Total: 106.8 km^{2} (41.2 sq mi)
- Elevation: 6 m (20 ft)

Population (30 April 2017)
  - Total: 11,994
  - Density: 112.3/km^{2} (290.9/sq mi)
- Demonym: Alfonsinesi
- Time zone: UTC+1 (CET)
  - Summer (DST): UTC+2 (CEST)
- Postal code: 48011
- Dialing code: 0544
- Patron saint: Madonna delle Grazie
- Saint day: 8 September
- Website: Official website

Alfonsine (Romagnol: Agl'infulsẽ or Agl'infulsèn) is a comune (municipality) in the province of Ravenna in the Italian region of Emilia-Romagna. It is located 60 kilometres (37 mi) east of Bologna and 15 kilometres (9 mi) northwest of Ravenna.

It is located between the Senio River and the Adriatic Sea. Its economy is based mostly on agriculture, especially wine and fruit production.

== History ==
=== Origin of the name ===
There are two main theories regarding the origin of the name Alfonsine. The most widely accepted theory, based on documents dating back to the early 16th century, is that the town is named after Alfonso Calcagnini, credited with reclaiming land from the marshes on which the town was founded. The second hypothesis is attributed to Antonio Polloni, who in his 1966 book Toponomastica Romagnola ("The geographical structure of the region of Romagna"), postulates that the name derives from the Latin term "fossa" (man-made ditch, channel), and that only later, by coincidence, it was influenced by the name of Alfonso Calcagnini.

=== From the founding to The Kingdom of Italy ===
Alfonsine was founded in 1464 when some land north of the city of Fusignano, consisting primarily of wetlands, was donated by Borso d'Este to Teofilo Calcagnini who began an aggressive reclamation process. In 1468 Calcagnini expanded his territory through the acquisition of additional land north of Fusignano from a Venetian noble. The original town center was developed in part on land north of the Senio river and in part around the church of Nostra Signora (Our Lady), built in 1502 by Alfonso Calcagnini, Teofilo's son.

This area was disputed territory between the city-state of Ravenna and the land controlled by the Este family. A compromise was eventually signed in 1506, giving the land to Ravenna. In 1509, the territories under the domain of Ravenna came under the control of the Papal States. In 1519 Pope Leo X transferred ownership of the region to Theophilus Calcagnini. To honor his benefactor Calcagnini called his land "Leonian territory". The Calcagnini family became feudal Lords on behalf of both the Church and the Este family. The family's position was confirmed by pope Clement VIII at the end of the 16th century.

During the 18th century the town's population and its economy grew. However, the living conditions of the commoners were harsh due to heavy taxation by the feudal class which left them impoverished.

The Napoleonic period saw the emancipation of Alfonsine, which in 1814 became a municipality. The following year, after the fall of Napoleon, the country returned to the Holy See. In 1859, with the loss of papal power in Romagna, Alfonsine was annexed to the Kingdom of Sardinia, which in 1861 became the Kingdom of Italy.

=== 20th century ===
In the beginning of the 20th century Alfonsine experienced social unrest. The harsh living conditions at the end of the previous century led to the formation of bands of outlaws, but also to the creation of political associations and charitable organizations which worked to improve the living conditions of the lower classes.

On the eve of World War I, from 7 to 13 June 1914, known in Italy as "Settimana Rossa" (Red Week), there was widespread unrest in Alfonsine, during which both the city hall and the church were set on fire.

During World War II, bloody clashes between the occupying Germans, Allied forces and Italian partisans, took place in Alfonsine, especially along the Senio river. In the area 70% of the houses were destroyed, while the historic center was completely destroyed by the Germans before their retreat northward, after having been heavily bombed by the Allies. The center of Alfonsine was later rebuilt between 1946 and 1956 by the architect Giuseppe Vaccaro.

==== July 2023 tornado ====
On July 22nd, 2023, a strong tornado would track through areas in and around Alfonsine producing IF3 damage. The tornado injured 14 people.

== Main sights ==
=== Churches ===
After World War II few historic buildings were left standing. Among them is the "Oratorio di S. Vincenzo Ferrari" (Oratory of San Vincenzo Ferrari) built in the mid-18th century, which houses a painting of the Virgin Mary attributed to the Longhi school. Also noteworthy is the reconstructed "Santuario della Madonna del Bosco" (Shrine of Our Lady of the Woods). Rebuilt on the ruins of its predecessor, it hosts a collection of 18th and 19th century Christian artifacts. In piazza Monti, where the original parish church was located, now stands the "Chiesa del Sacro Cuore" (Church of the Sacred Heart). The parish church was instead rebuilt at a new location and dedicated to Saint Mary.

=== Open space and parks ===
The Special Natural Reserve of Alfosine is part of the Regional Park of the Po Delta. It consists of three areas that were once inhabited, and subsequently converted to parkland and returned to a natural state.

== Honors ==
The City of Alfonsine received the Military Valor award for the Italian war of Independence as well as the silver medal for Military Valor for World War II for the sacrifices of its people as well as their participation to the Partisan resistance.

== International relations ==
Alfonsine is twinned with:

- Nagykáta, Hungary, since 1962
- Spello, Italy, since 1974
- San Vito di Cadore, Italy, since 1988
- Mayahi, Niger, since 1988
- Toritto, Italy, since 2013

== Sources ==
- Biagi, Enzo (1975). Italia. Milan: Rizzoli Editore. pp. 81–100.
