= 1943 Naples post-office bombing =

Time bomb sabotage in Naples, Italy

Coordinates: 40.833°N 14.25°E

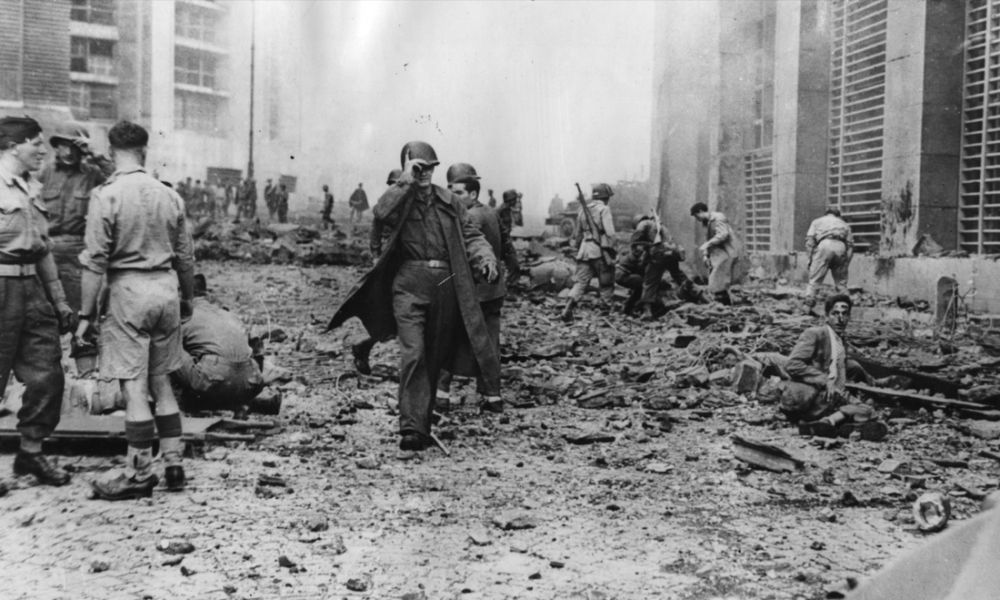
1943 Naples post-office bombing

The 1943 Naples post office bombing occurred on October 7, 1943, after the U.S. Fifth Army had captured Naples (October 1) and reached the Volturno River (October 6). The Palazzo delle Poste, Naples, an imposing structure, completed in 1936 is located in the center of the city, was looted by Nazi troops during the occupation. After their retreat it became occupied by families who were made homeless by the bombing and destruction heaped on the city. This happened during the insurrection that was known as the "Four days of Naples" that had taken place a few weeks earlier. On that morning a series of violent explosions ripped through the building and caused heavy damage to the surrounding buildings and the death of more than 100 people, including women, children and members of a 82nd Airborne Division unit. The unit was commanded by General Matthew B. Ridgway. An investigation determined that the explosion was the result of several time bombs planted by Italian fascists six days earlier.

A reporter from the Time and Life magazines, Will Lang Jr., was no more than 300 feet (90 m) from the explosion when it occurred. The shockwave threw him to the ground, and the impact sprained his right arm. A photographer for LIFE magazine, Robert Capa, and Acme News photographer Charles Corte began taking pictures of the shattered Post Office and the carnage lying in the streets. One of the physicians on hand was Brigadier General Edgar Hume whose office was across the street from the post office.
