= Guido Mazzoni (sculptor) =

Italian sculptor

Guido Mazzoni (c. 1445 – 1518, active 1473–1518) was an Italian Renaissance sculptor, mainly in terracotta, and painter of the Renaissance period, working in Bologna, Naples, and France. He is also sometimes referred to as Il Modanino.

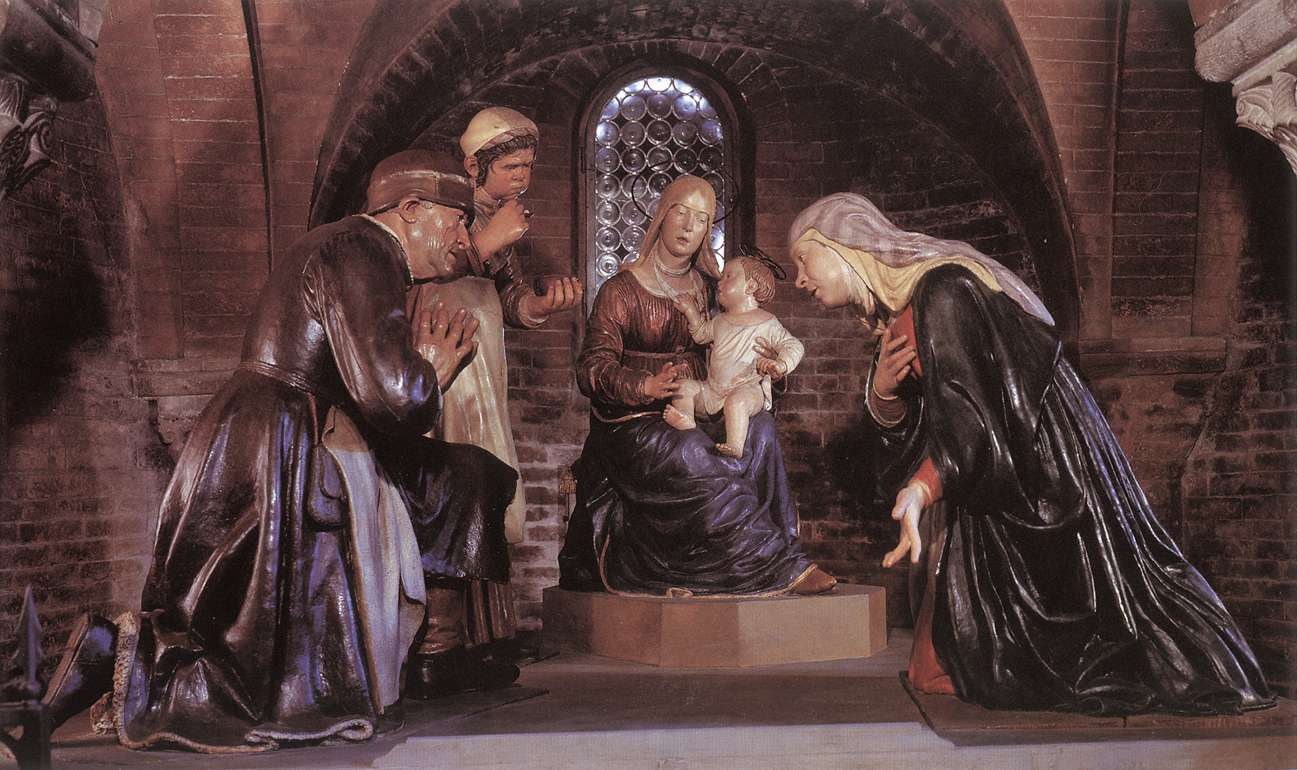
Adoration of the Shepherds, Cathedral, Modena, polychrome terracotta

== Biography ==
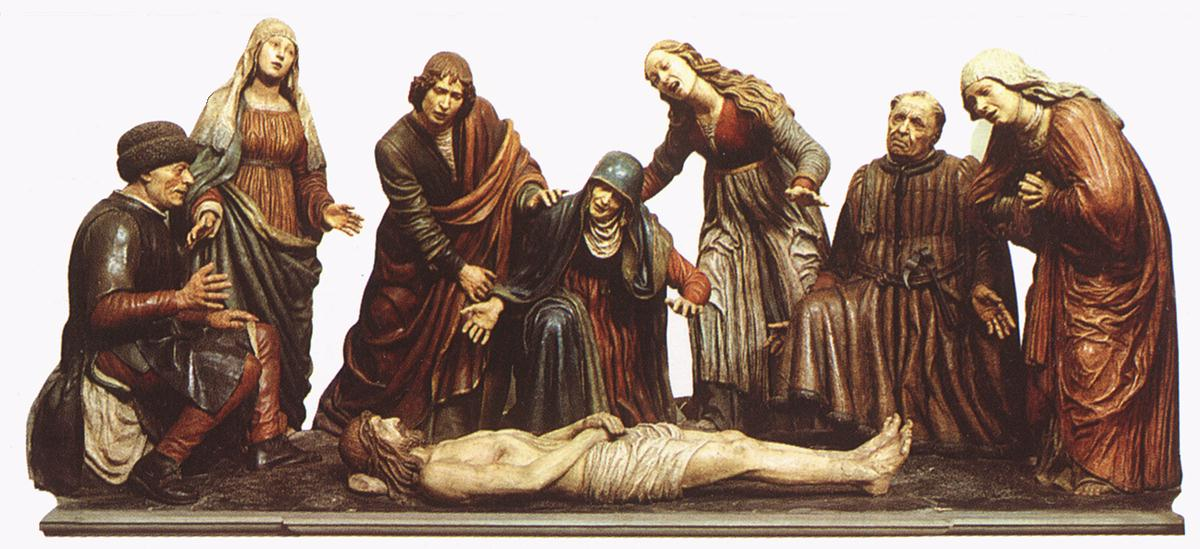
Compianto, San Giovanni Battista, Modena

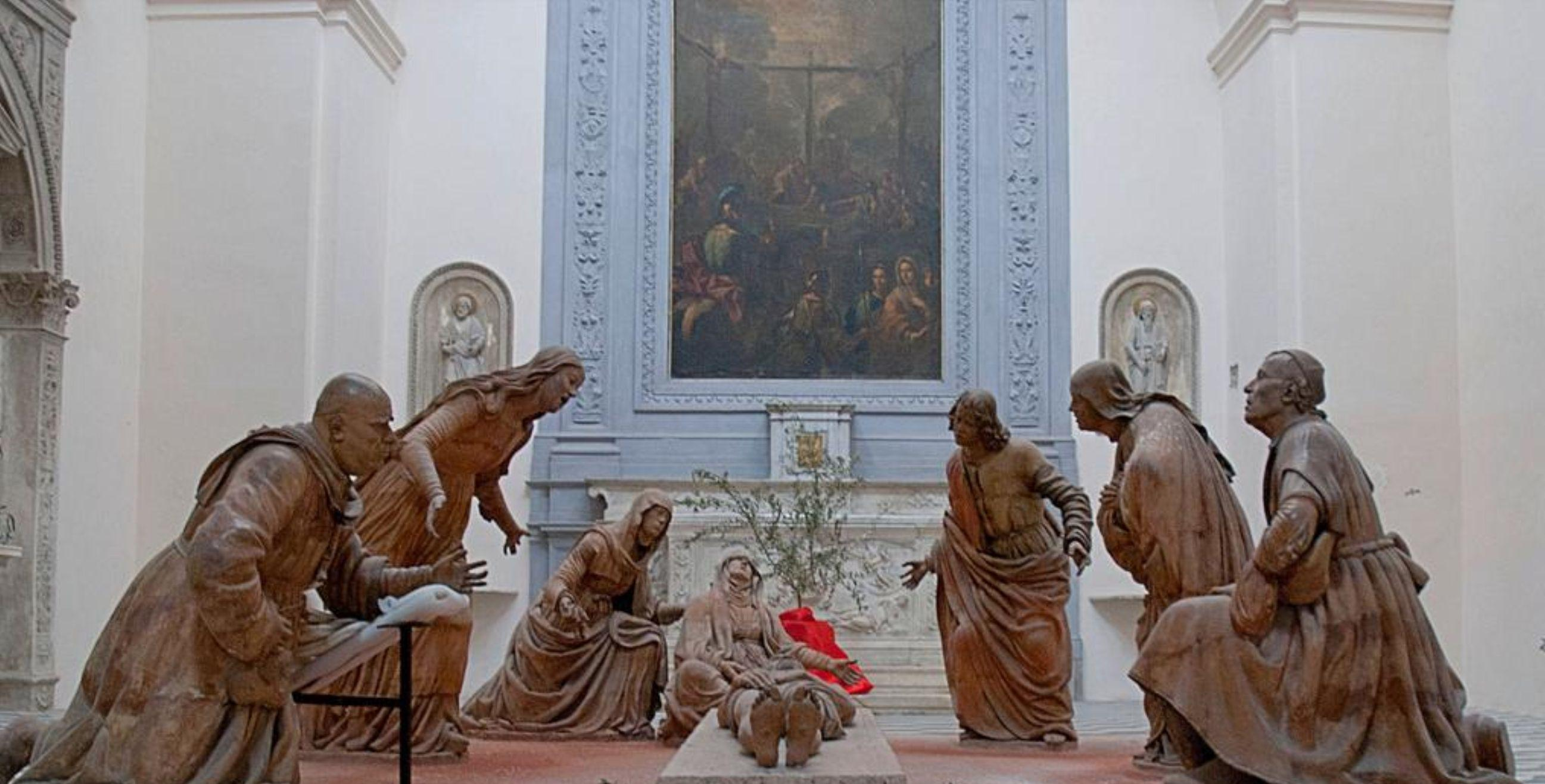
Compianto, Sant'Anna dei Lombardi, Naples

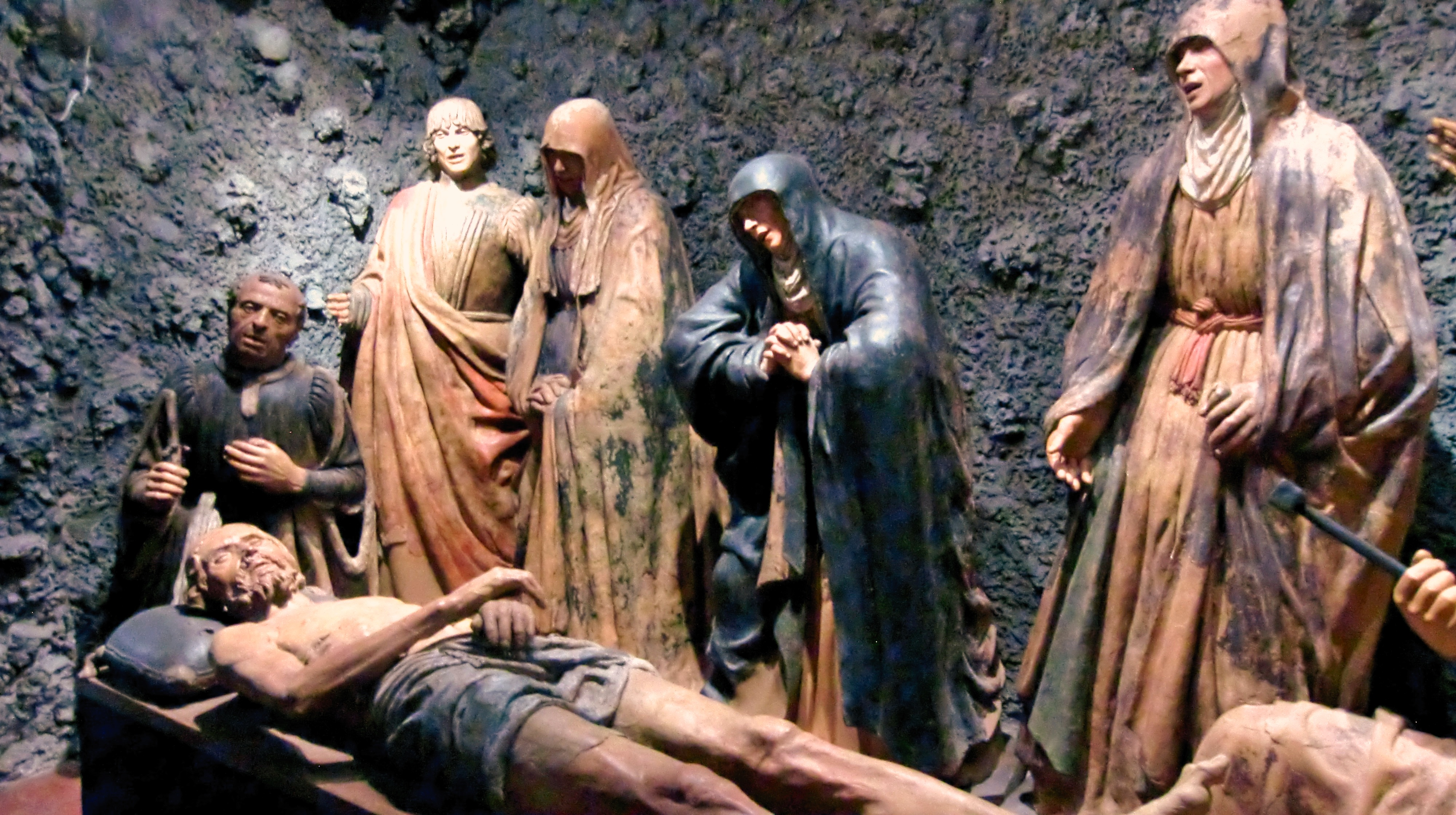
Compianto, Santa Maria degli Angeli, Busseto

Guido Mazzoni was born in Modena and first became active in that city, ruled at the time by the Este family of Ferrara. A case has been made for his early training in the studio of Francesco Cossa. His earliest recorded work appears in 1473, when he made theatrical masks and props for the Duke of Ferrara's wedding. He is known to have continued such ephemera of court life throughout his career, but is most famous for his ultra-realistic terracotta sculpture.

Mazzoni's best known works are a series of multi-figure depictions of the Lamentation (Compianto) now in the Church of Gesù, Ferrara, and another in the church of Sant'Anna dei Lombardi in Naples. These realistic life-size figures are modelled in terracotta, for native stone was lacking in Modena, and subsequently painted. They represent emotive mourners gathered around the dead Christ, in which each character is a portrait of either the donor or a relative of the donor; in the Modena Lamentation, for instance, Ercole I d'Este represents Nicodemus and his wife Eleonor represents Mary of Cleophas. In the Neapolitan piece, Alfonso II is Joseph of Arimathea. It seems probable that Mazzoni's background in theatrical masks and props affected his work, because of the staged melodrama in their gestures and expressions. One attractive theory is that they relate to an annual passion play, in which these notable figures may have played some part.

In the more prestigious artistic centre of Florence the Della Robbia family became famous for their distinctive blue and white tin-glazed terracotta work, which was highly skillfully made yet provided relatively cheap decoration. Most closely related to the work of Mazzoni, however, is that of Niccolò dell'Arca, who operated in Bologna. He also made scenes of the Lamentation, but they display an expressionist style, with an exaggerated sense of movement and drama. Mazzoni's figures are far more realistic and their movements and gestures are more restrained.

Mazzoni's work was well respected by his contemporaries, and he was granted tax exemption in 1481. He soon attracted the attention of the outside world, when in 1489 he was asked by the aforementioned Alfonso of Aragon, brother-in law to Ercole, to carry out some work in Naples. There Charles VIII of France was so taken with Guido's work during his successful military intervention in Naples that in 1495 Guido became one of the first Italian artists to move to the court of Charles VIII of France, where he was the best paid also knighted. Guido was entrusted with the kneeling lifesize figure of the king and accompanying angels for Charles VIII's tomb at the royal abbey of St-Denis, destroyed during the French Revolution. The French court became increasingly keen on Italian artists and afterwards began luring many more. Guido and his French workshop have been recognized with more and less certainty in other funereal works of personages connected with the court: the figures of Philippe de Commines, historian of Charles' expedition, and his wife, Hélène de Chambes, removed from the Grands-Augustins to the Louvre Museum reveal Mazzoni's dramatic realism through a workshop execution; the Dormition of the Virgin for the Abbaie de la Trinité, Fécamp, is attributed to Mazzoni with the aid of his studio;

In 1509 a document records a payment to Mazzoni for sculpted medallions all'antique for the Château de Gaillon, built by Cardinal Georges d'Amboise, the faithful friend and councillor of Louis XII of France. Timothy Verdon notes the close relations of the abbot at Fécamp and the archbishop of Rouen, who was charged with the funeral arrangements for Charles VII, and suggests a further attribution, of a Pietà with four lifesize figures that was formerly in the embrasure behind the altar in the abbot's chapel of the Hôtel de Cluny, Paris; the ensemble was commissioned by the brother of the Cardinal d'Amboise, Jacques d'Amboise, abbot of Cluny. The sculptural group was described in the 18th century by Jean-Aymar Piganiol de La Force, "d'une bonne main et très bien dessinées pour le temps" Description historique de la ville de Paris vol. vi (1765) pp 306f, but were destroyed at the Revolution; there remain only the subsidiary early 16th-century painted images of Mary of Cleophas and Mary Salomé, which Verdon suggests are by Mazzoni.

Mazzoni's art was highly realistic and sought after by many powerful figures at the time. As Andrew Graham-Dixon points out, Mazzoni 'deserves to be ranked alongside any of his better-known contemporaries. The traditions of the highly realised terracotta sculpture [...] played a crucial role in shaping the imagination of pious Italians in the 15th, 16th and 17th centuries' His lagging fame, relative to the sculptors of Rome and Florence, in part can be assigned to distance from the artistic centers of Florence, Venice and Rome. In addition, his use of terracotta is by some reflective of less value than works of bronze and marble. Ultimately, Mazzoni was a highly important artist of his period, both in terms of the skill of his art and the historical significance of his life. As Alison Cole points out in her study of the Italian Renaissance Courts, it had a biblical symbolism as 'men are "no more than mortal clay"'.

His work was an influence on the monochrome terracotta sculpture of Antonio Begarelli.
