= Palazzo delle Poste, Naples =

Coordinates: 40°50′37″N 14°15′05″E

Palazzo delle Poste (Naples)
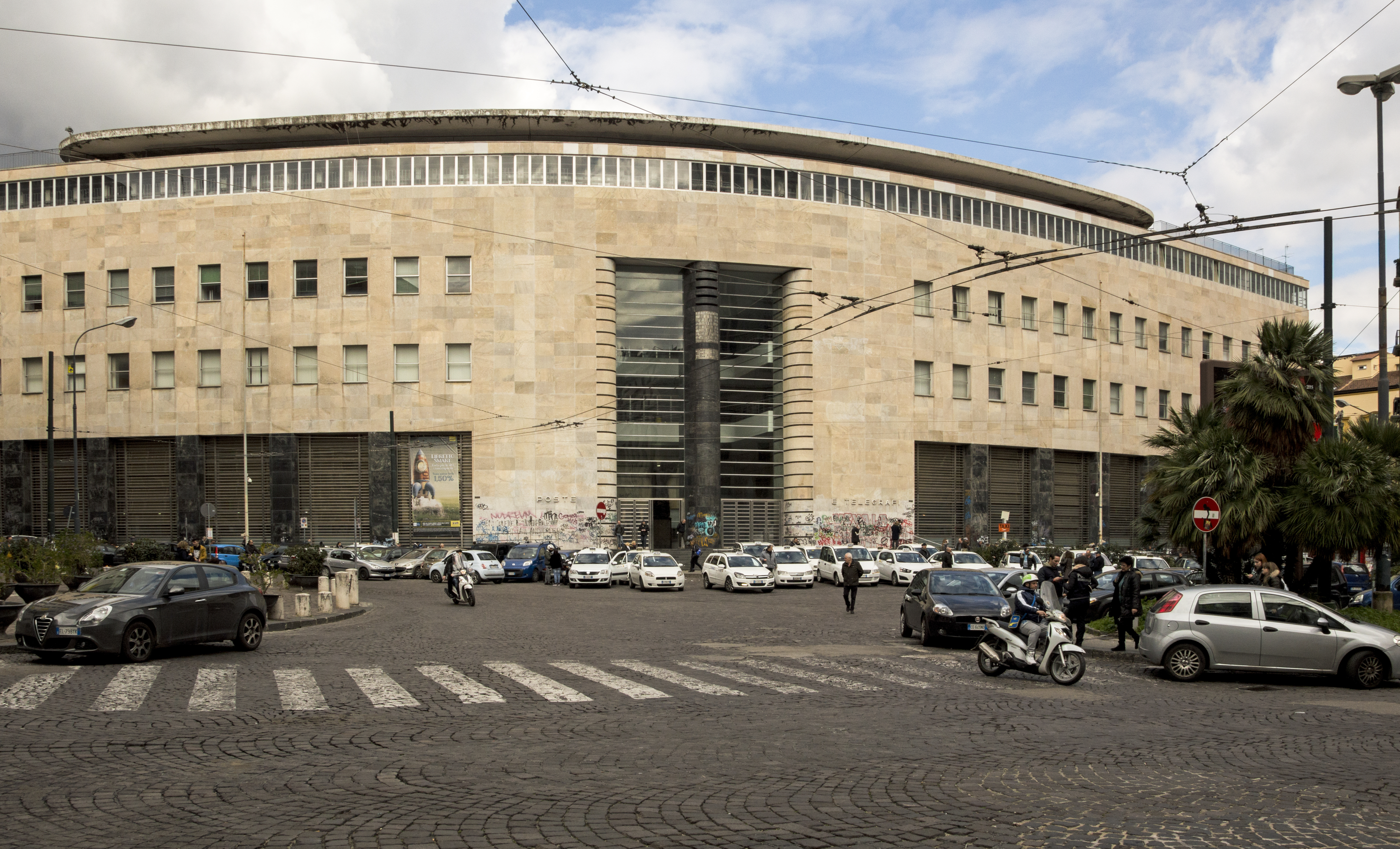
- Palazzo delle Poste, Naples
- Interactive map of the Palazzo delle Poste (Naples) area

General information
- Architectural style: Rationalist
- Location: Piazza Matteotti; Naples, Italy
- Construction started: 1928
- Completed: 1936
- Client: Poste Italiane

Design and construction
- Architects: Giuseppe Vaccaro, Gino Franzi

The Palazzo delle Poste (Italian: "Post Office Palace") is located in Piazza Matteotti in central Naples. It is an example of architecture completed during the fascist government of Benito Mussolini. Another such example is the nearby Palazzo della Casa del Mutilato and the adjacent Palazzo della Questura (Police Headquarters) on via Medina. Just north and across the street on via Monteoliveto is the 16th-century Palazzo Orsini di Gravina.

To make way for the building, houses from the rione of San Giuseppe-Carità were demolished in 1930. Construction began in 1928 under Costanzo Ciano, head of the Ministry of Communications; when finally completed in 1936, it was inaugurated by the minister, Antonio Stefano Benni. The design was by the Bolognese architect Giuseppe Vaccaro, and was influenced by the Rationalist style of Italian architecture promoted by Marcello Piacentini. The architect Gino Franzi modified and completed the final building. The design incorporated the adjacent cloister of Monteoliveto into the complex. On October 7, 1943, a few days after the Four Days of Naples, the Palazzo delle Poste suffered a violent explosion, leaving many people dead or wounded. It is thought that the building had been mined with timed fuses by the retreating German army.

The attic now has a museum in honor of Vincenzo Tucci, a journalist for Il Mattino. In the lobby, which rises nearly the full height of the building, there is a sculpture dedicated to the "fallen" by Arturo Martini.
