= Sant'Anna dei Lombardi =

Church of St. Anne of the Lombards
- Chiesa di Sant'Anna dei Lombardi
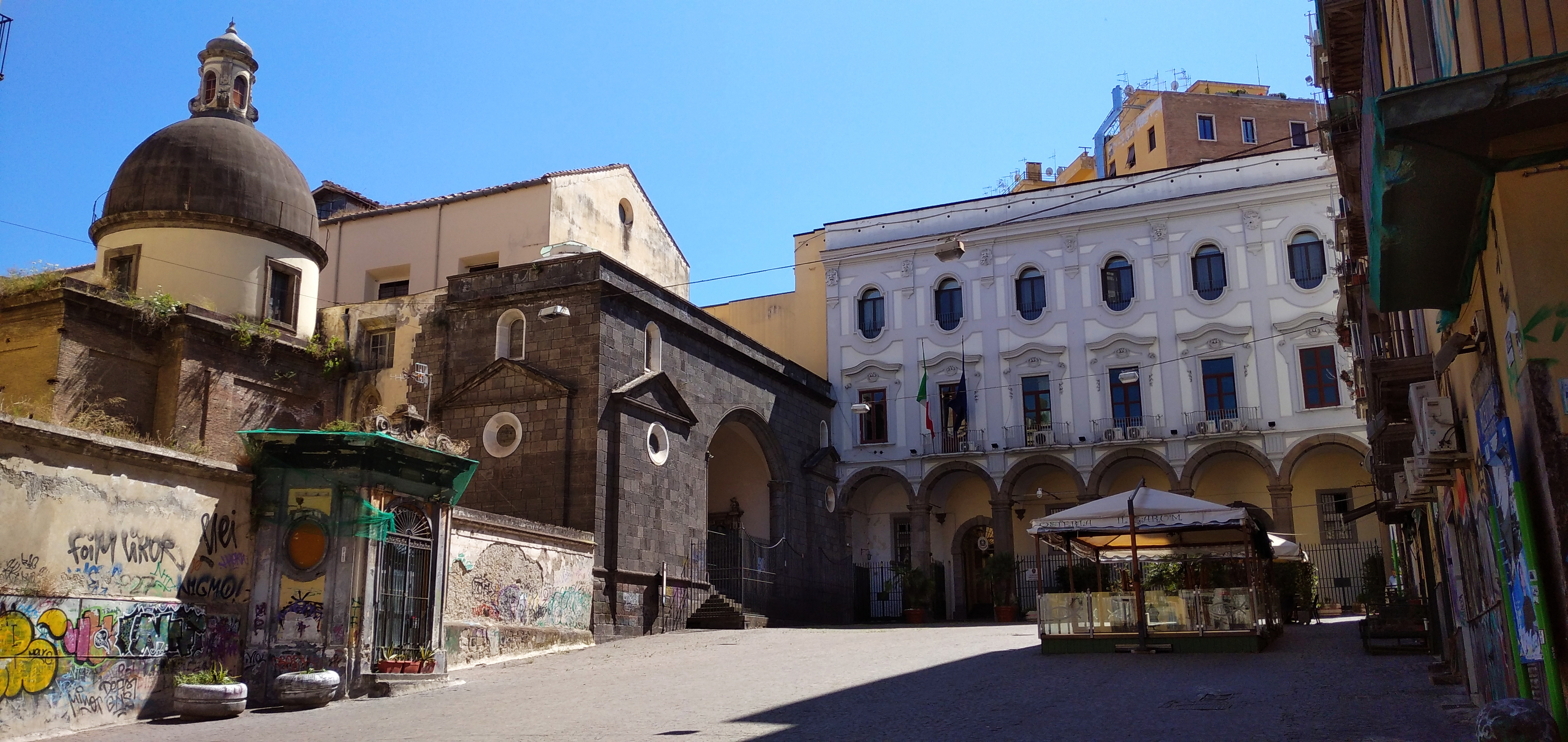
- The façade of Sant'Anna dei Lombardi
- Church of St. Anne of the Lombards
- 40.844816°N 14.250525°E
- Location: Piazza Monteoliveto; Naples; Province of Naples, Campania
- Country: Italy
- Denomination: Roman Catholic

History
- Status: Active

Architecture
- Architectural type: Church
- Style: Gothic architecture, Renaissance architecture
- Groundbreaking: 1411

Administration
- Diocese: Roman Catholic Archdiocese of Naples

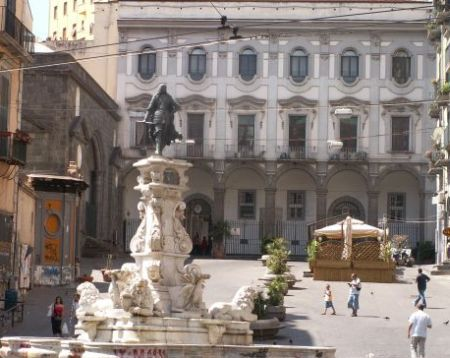
Fontana di Monteoliveto

Sant'Anna dei Lombardi (Italian for 'St. Anne of the Lombards'), also known as Santa Maria di Monte Oliveto, is an ancient church and convent located in Piazza Monteoliveto in central Naples, Italy. Across Via Monteoliveto from the Fountain in the square is the Renaissance palace of Orsini di Gravina.

== History ==
The church was originally built in 1411 by Gurello Orilia or Origlia, protonotary of the king Ladislas of Durazzo, who sponsored the construction of the church for the Monastery of Santa Maria di Monte Oliveto, as it was first called. Some refer to this as the Church of Monteoliveto (it:Chiesa di Monteoliveto). The church was sited near the Palazzo Carafa di Maddaloni. It was entrusted to the Benedictine order of Olivetans, whose mother house is the Abbey of Monte Oliveto in Tuscany. The convent received extensive patronage from Alfonso I of Aragon and members of his court. Further reconstructions of the church took place in 1581 by Domenico Fontana. In the 17th century, the church and convent were reconstructed in a Baroque style by Gaetano Sacco.

In 1798, King Ferdinand I removed the Olivetan order from the convent and church. The lay Arch-Confraternity of Lombardi moved into the church of Monteoliveto, which soon was renamed Sant'Anna dei Lombardi; the name was changed because the confraternity in 1798 had lost their own nearby church which had been dedicated to Saint Anne. In 1805, an earthquake collapsed a large part of the church. This collapse destroyed three Caravaggio paintings that once stood in the church: St Francis in Meditation, St Francis Receives Stigmata and a Resurrection.

The entire complex was at one time one of the largest monasteries in Italy, occupying what today can be measured only in "city blocks". Urban renewal from the 1930s literally built around the old premises, leaving much of the original structure standing in the center. For example, the gigantic main post office in Naples is at west end of the old monastery and the older edifice was simply incorporated into the back of the Naples Central Post Office such that the monastery seems to flow out of the more modern building. At the east end, the church, itself, is still in use, but the adjacent monastery premise and courtyard are now a Carabinieri (Italian national police force) barracks.

== Description ==
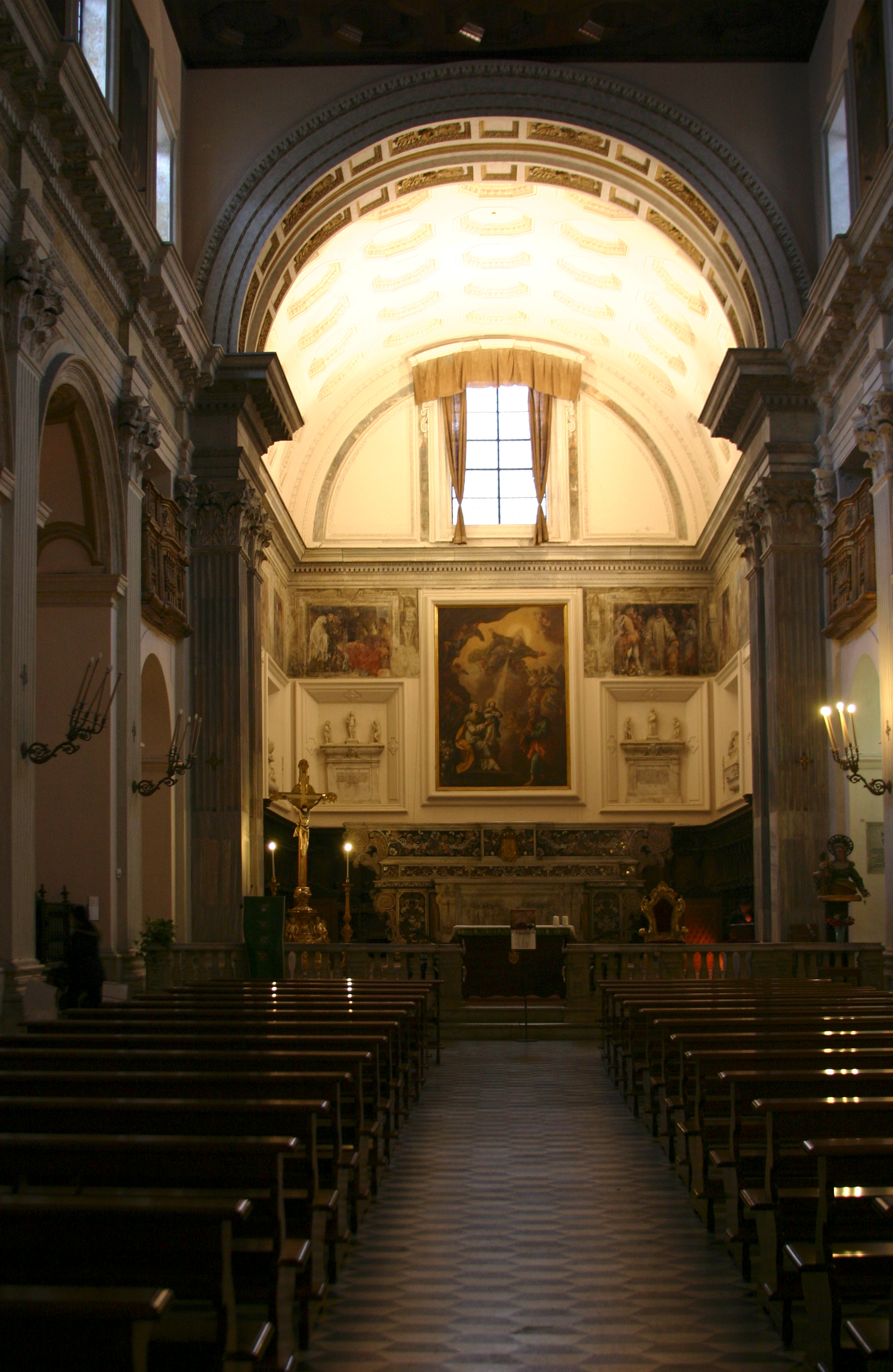
aisle towards altar

The church structure is unusual in that the nave has no transept, thus no crossing, but instead has a linear rectangular layout with ten lateral chapels. The initial plan is attribute to Andrea Ciccione, but it underwent an updated refurbishment in a late Renaissance style by Fontana. He is commemorated in the portico by a monument.

The architect Benedetto da Majano helped design and decorate the Piccolomini and Correale Chapels. The church decoration and structure reflects the 17th century and later reconstructions, which now obscure the original Gothic architecture.

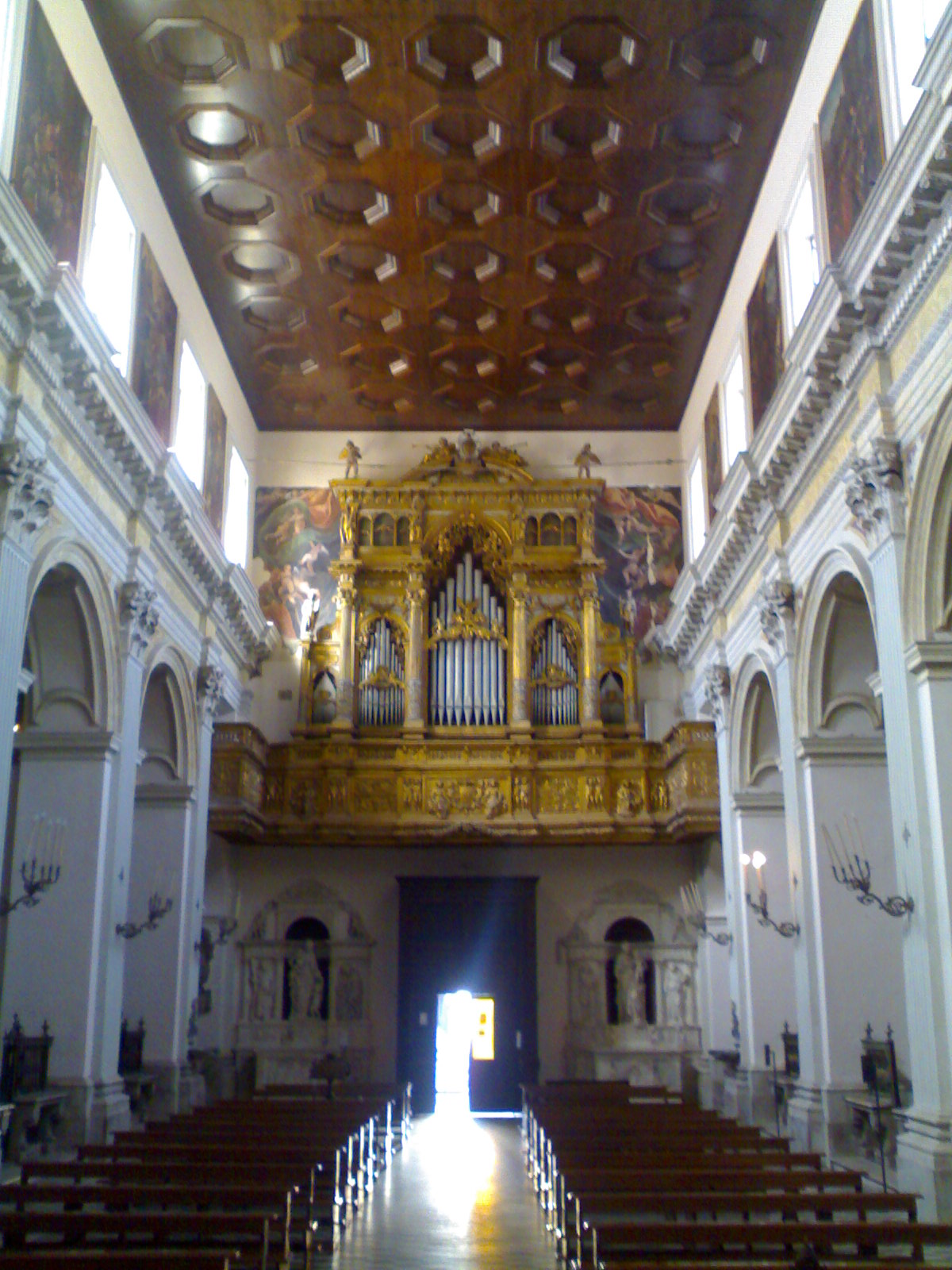
Nave toward the Counterfacade

Among its decorated interiors are the 16th century sanctuary which contains sculpture by Guido Mazzoni, Antonio Rossellino, Benedetto da Majano, Giovanni da Nola, Pedro Rubiales and others. Gothic details are still preserved in the tomb of Domenico Fontana, and the altar was executed on the design of Giovan Domenico Vinaccia by Bartolomeo and Pietro Ghetti.

At the mouth of the piazza in front of the church, is the Fontana di Monteoliveto, or Fountain of Monteoliveto. It was commissioned by Pedro Antonio de Aragón from the architect Cosimo Fanzago, and completed in 1699. Atop stands a bronze statue of Charles II of Spain.

== Chapels ==
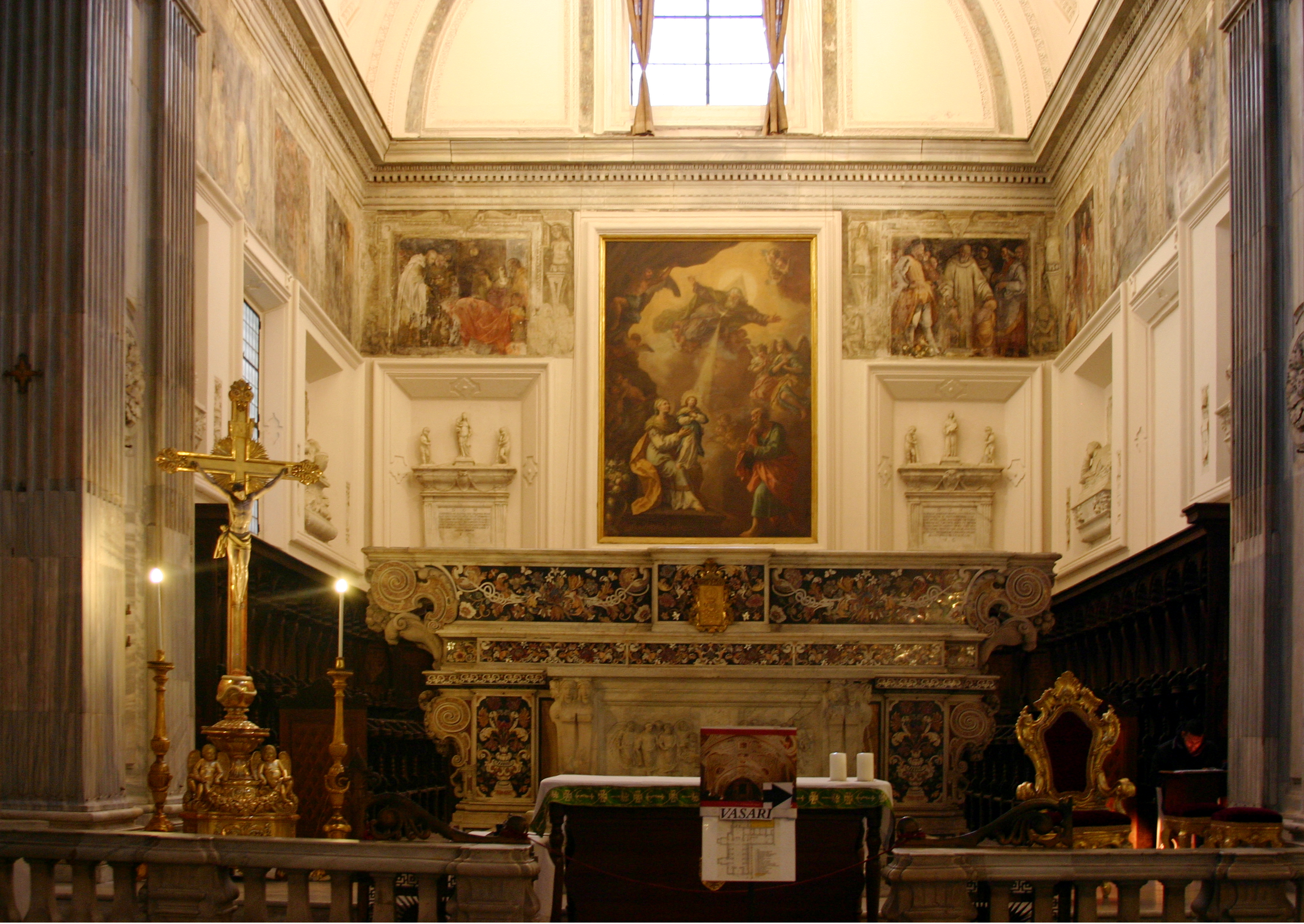
Main altar

== Right side ==
- Mastrogiudice Chapel: contains a Madonna and Child with Saints John the Baptist, Jerome, and Andrea by Giovanni da Nola and fresco cycles by Battistello Caracciolo.
- Chapel of the Annunciation: adjacent to the first, there is another chapel with a Madonna with Child and Saints Peter and John the Baptist and a Christ and St. Peter on the lake of Galilee by Girolamo Santacroce.
- Chapel of Santa Francesca Romana: Has paintings of the life of the saint by Vincenzo Fate and Giovanni Battista Lama, frescoes by Giuseppe Simonelli.
- Chapel of St. Anthony of Padua: There are frescoes of Life of St. Anthony by Nicola Malinconico and St Anthony of Padua and Preaching of St. Anthony by Annibale Caccavello.

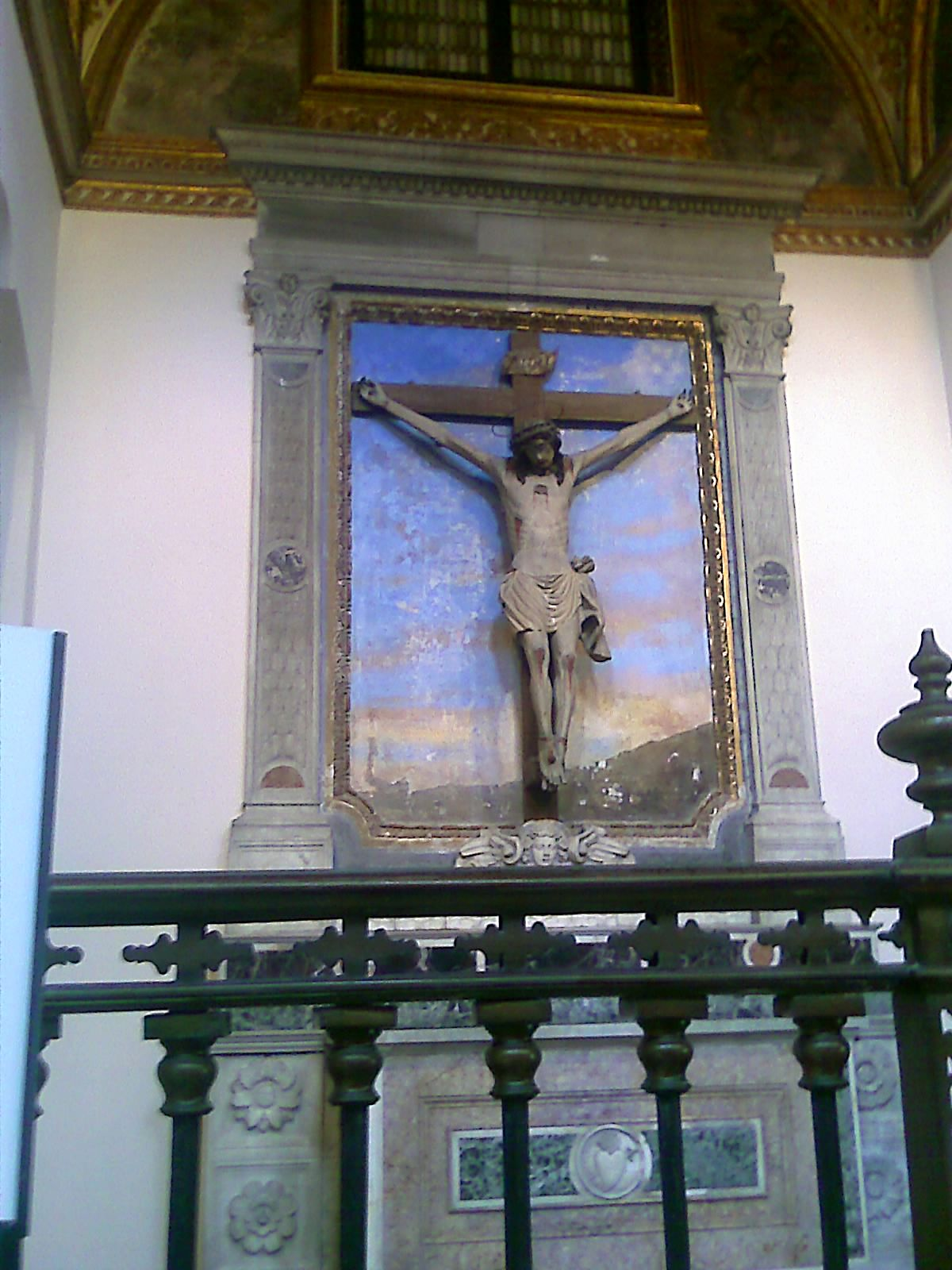
Scala Chapel - the crucifix

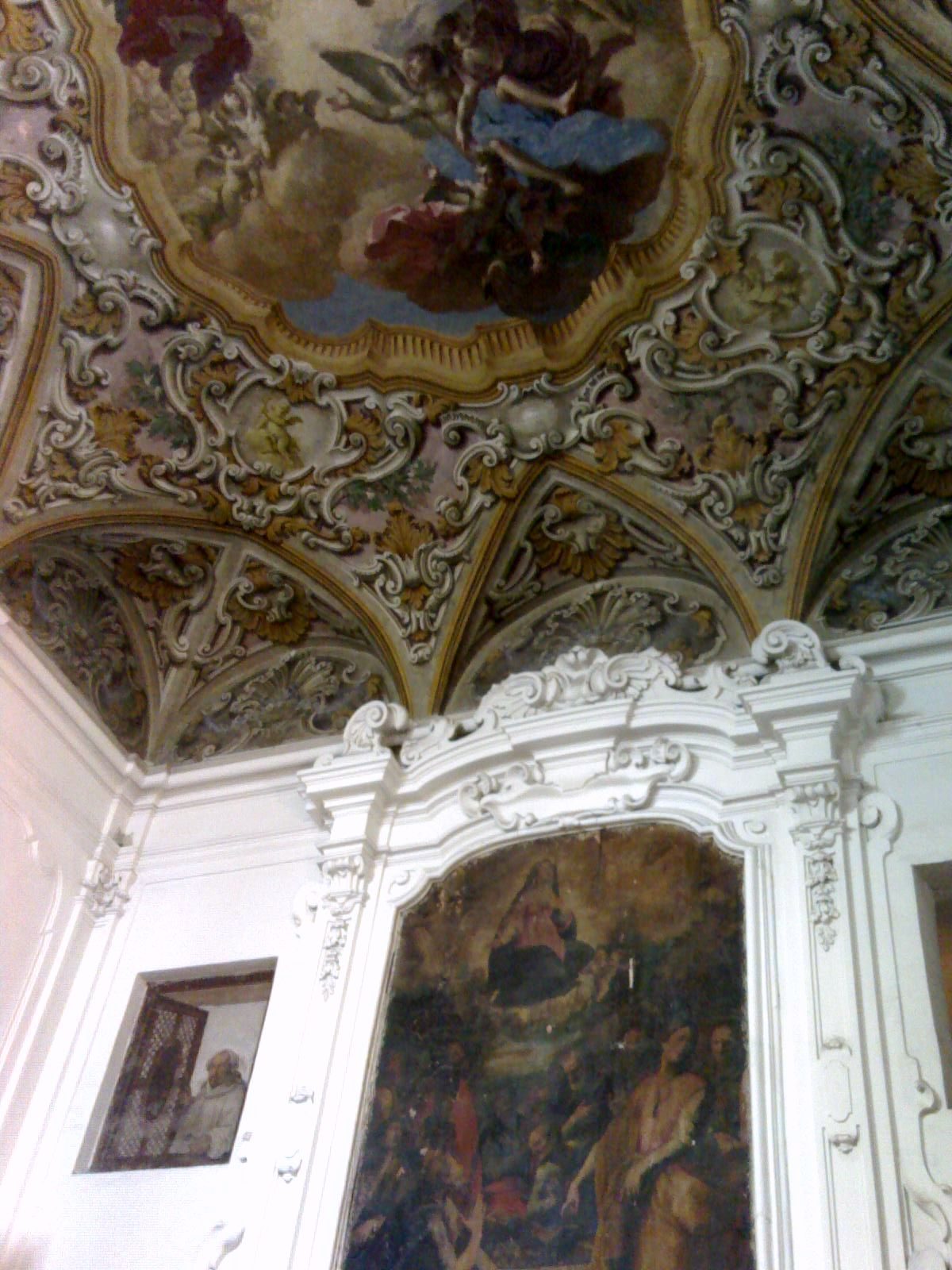
Anteroom to sacristy of Vasari

- Scala Chapel: Contains tombs of the military, likely Spanish, Scala family. These remains are housed under the plaque with flower designs placed at the center of the marble floor. The backe wall of chapel shows an altar surmounted by a wooden crucifix by an unknown master, as well as a cycle of frescoes on the Life of Christ by Malinconico.
- 'Chapel of St. Christopher: has an altarpiece of St Christopher by Francesco Solimena, the tomb monument of Bosco Caesar by Matteo Bottiglieri and in the vault frescoes of Life of St Christopher by Giuseppe Simonelli.
- Chapel of the Goldsmiths (Capella de Orefice on the side of the apse) There are frescoes depicting Stories and Virtues of the Virgin by Luigi Rodriguez. On the sides are funerary monuments Antonio Orefice and his son Girolamo D'Auria.
- Fiodo Chapel: Accessed by a passageway, on side walls are burial monuments for Antonio d'Alessandro, the Baron of Cardito and diplomat and jurist. His wife, the Neapolitan aristocrat Maddalena Riccio (Rizzo) is buried beside him. The tomb was designed and sculpted by Giovan Tommaso Malvern in 1491. The tomb monument of Antonio Fiodo was completed by Francesco da Sangallo and Bernardino del Moro.
- Chapel of Mourning (Cappella del Compianto) After the Fiodo Chapel, this houses the sculpture of the Lamentation over the Dead Christ (1492) by Guido Mazzoni. On the back wall there is a Calvary by Giuseppe Mastroleo.
- Antechamber which gives the sacristy: In the above the sacristy of Vasari is a majolica tiled floor, frescoes on the vault, an altarpiece of Fabrizio Santafede depicting Assumption of the Virgin and to the side of a fresco portrait of an Olivetan monk, by Vasari.
- Sacristy of Vasari: Reached by a passageway through Fiodo Chapel. The sacristy has Tuscan Renaissance style frescoes painted by Giorgio Vasari, as well as wooden stalls decorated with wooden inlay (1506–10) by Fra Giovanni da Verona.

== Left ==
- Tolosa Chapel (in left transept, accessed by passageway. The frescoes are Cristoforo Scacco di Verona and the canvas by Reginaldo Piramo da Monopoli. The terracotta was likely from the Della Robbia studio, originally destined for the Cappella Piccolomini.
- Piccolomini Chapel: This chapel is an quintessential example of Tuscan Renaissance architecture. The chapel was completed by Giuliano da Majano, Benedetto da Majano and Antonio Rossellino following the example of the Chapel of the Cardinal of Portugal found in San Miniato al Monte in Florence.

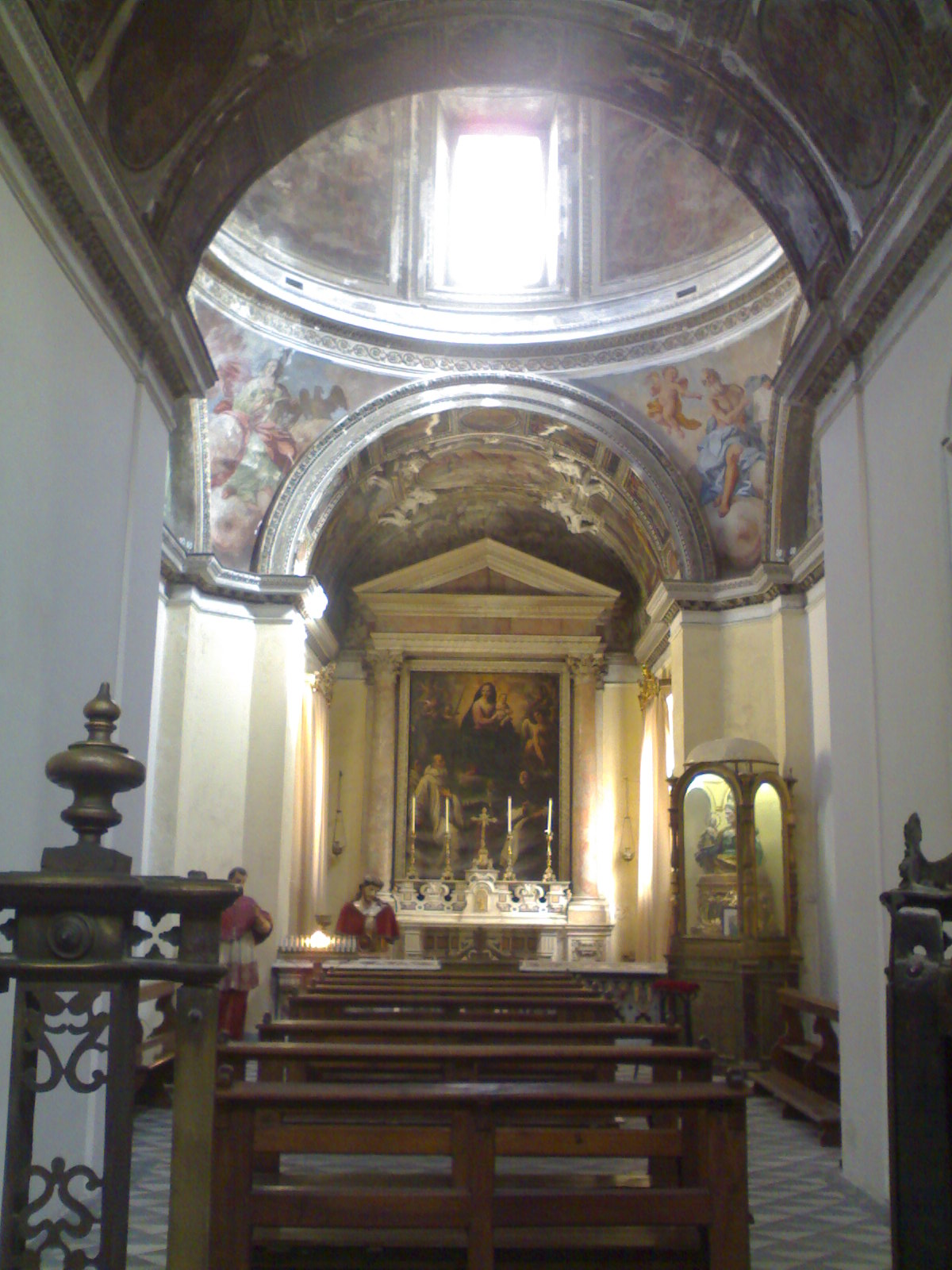
Avalos Chapel

- Avalos Chapel: Contains an altarpiece depicting Madonna and Child with Saints Benedict & Thomas (1606) by Fabrizio Santafede. Frescoed on the dome and drum are Stories of Old and New Testament by Giovanni Antonio Arditi and Antonio Sarnelli.
- Chapel of Santi Mauro e Placido: Contains an altarpiece of the Madonna and Child with Saints Mauro and Placido (1708) by Paolo de Matteis. The frescoes on the ceiling and lunettes depict the Glory and Life of the Saints Mauro and Placido were painted by Nicola Malinconico. The side walls have two memorials: on the left, is a tomb dedicated to John and Charles Rapario with a depiction of the Flagellation by an unknown Neapolitan master of 1576, the other tomb is dedicated to Grazia Cavaniglia and is by Giacomo della Pila.
- Porcinari Chapel: Contains works by Paolo de Matteis, Francesco Di Maria, Pacecco De Rosa, and Carlo De Rosa.
- Chapel of St John the Baptist: contains a sculpture of John the Baptist (1516) by Giovanni da Nola. The Annunciation and Pietà bas-reliefs are by Giacomo della Pila, while frescoes of Glory and life of the saint are by while De Matteis.
- Savarese Chapel (on the side of the apse): On the front wall is an anonymous 15th-century fresco, while the sides feature Delivery of keys to St. Peter and St. Peter saved from the waters (1608) by Carlo Sellitto.

== See also ==
- Late medieval domes

== Sources ==
- François de Sade, Viaggio in Italia, Bollati Boringhieri, Traduzione di G. Ferrara degli Uberti, ISBN 88-339-1004-0. Florence, 1996.
- Vincenzo Regina, Le chiese di Napoli. Viaggio indimenticabile attraverso la storia artistica, architettonica, letteraria, civile e spirituale della Napoli sacra, Newton e Compton editore, Naples, 2004.
- Napoli sacra. Guida alle chiese della città, Naples (1993-1997)
