= Fra Giovanni da Verona =

Italian sculptor

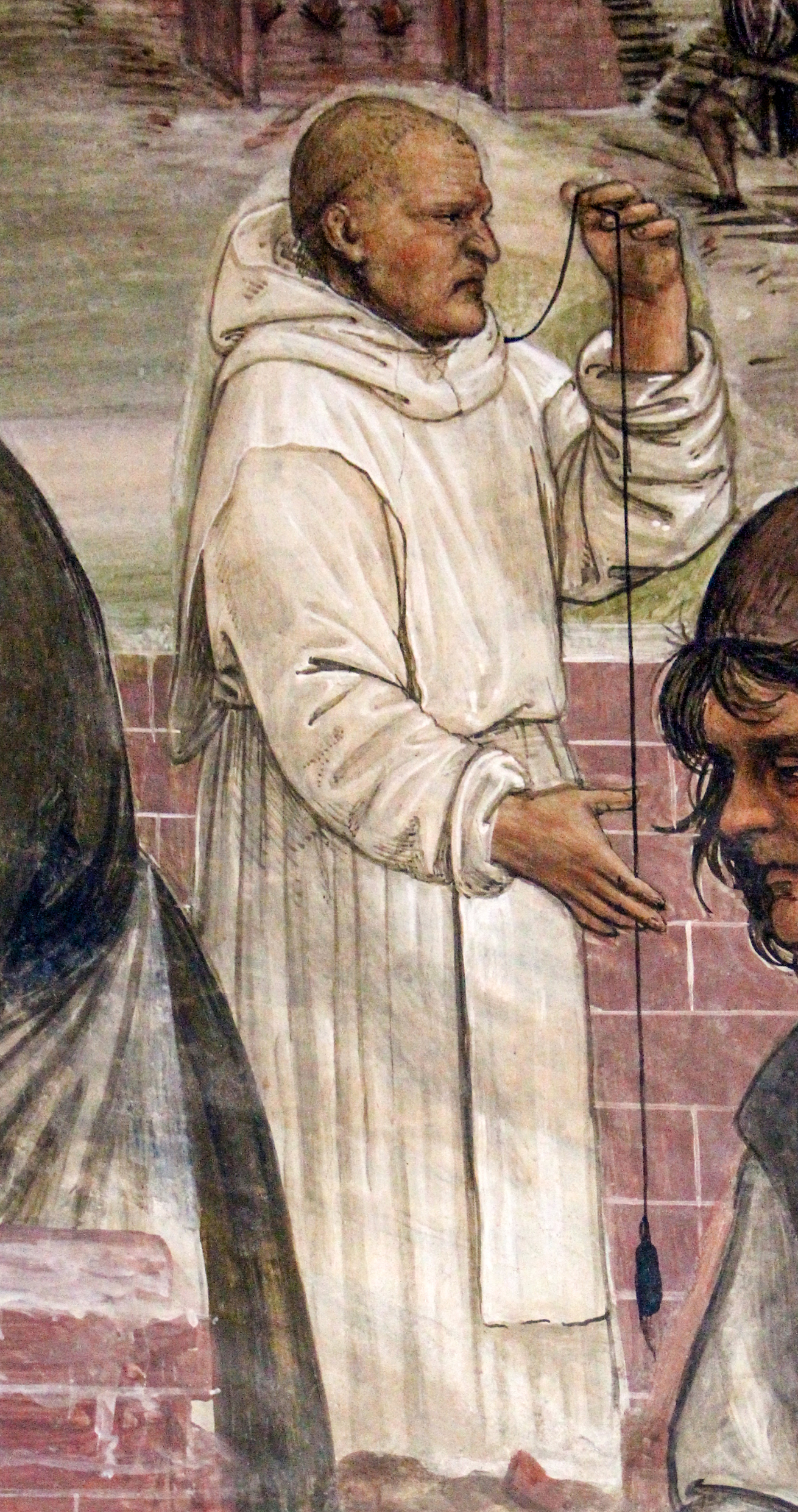
- Portrait of Fra Giovanni da Verona by Il Sodoma in the cloister of the monastery of Monte Oliveto Maggiore
- Born: c. 1457; Verona, Republic of Venice (present-day Italy)
- Died: 10 February 1525; Verona, Republic of Venice (present-day Italy)
- Known for: Sculpture; Woodworking
- Movement: High Renaissance

Fra Giovanni da Verona (c. 1457 – 10 February 1525) was an Italian Olivetan monk, sculptor, architect, miniature painter and woodworker of the Renaissance period. He was active between the late 15th and early 16th centuries.

== Biography ==
The most important source of information about Fra Giovanni's life are the registers of his order. Born in Verona, he entered the Olivetans as a novice at the monastery of Monte Oliveto Maggiore near Siena in 1476. After his ordination, he was sent to the Olivetan monastery of San Giorgio in Ferrara, where he probably trained under Fra Sebastiano da Rovigno. During the first phase of his career, which lasted until 1506, he worked in Monte Oliveto Maggiore, Ferrara and Verona. The second phase, from 1506 to 1525, saw him active in Naples, Rome and various places in central and northern Italy.

Fra Giovanni's most renowned early works are located in Verona – most notably the choir stalls in the church of Santa Maria in Organo, created between 1491 and 1499 and now considered his masterpiece. Between 1502 and 1504 he worked on the great choir complex at Monte Oliveto Maggiore (now divided between the abbey church and Siena Cathedral), the intarsia panels of which, featuring birds, fountains, diverse objects and views of Siena, represent the high point of his creativity and skill.

Between 1506 and 1510 Giovanni divided his time between Naples and Fondi. In Naples, he produced intarsia work for the choir of the Sant'Anna dei Lombardi, where he showed a keen interest in architectural motifs. One of the choir-stalls exhibits a view of Donato Bramante’s Tempietto (1502) at San Pietro in Montorio, Rome.

In Rome, he worked on various projects, including the seat backs (c. 1513) for the Stanza della Segnatura in the Apostolic Palace, of which only a few fragments remain. Only remnants of his later works have survived, such as a carved frame and a door in the Palazzo Comunale in Monte San Savino. Fra Giovanni's last work was on the wardrobes (1519) in the sacristy of Santa Maria in Organo, Verona, and the choir-stalls (1523) of Villanova del Sillaro Abbey, near Milan. Commissioned by Prior Filippo Villani for the Olivetan church of the Annunciata in Lodi, this last commission originally called for 33 perspective panels. Fra Giovanni completed 23 panels before his death in 1525, and the surviving stalls were later relocated to Lodi Cathedral. The panels are decorated with intarsia depicting landscapes, architectural motifs, musical instruments, and geometric solids inspired by Leonardo da Vinci's drawings for Luca Pacioli's Divina Proportione.

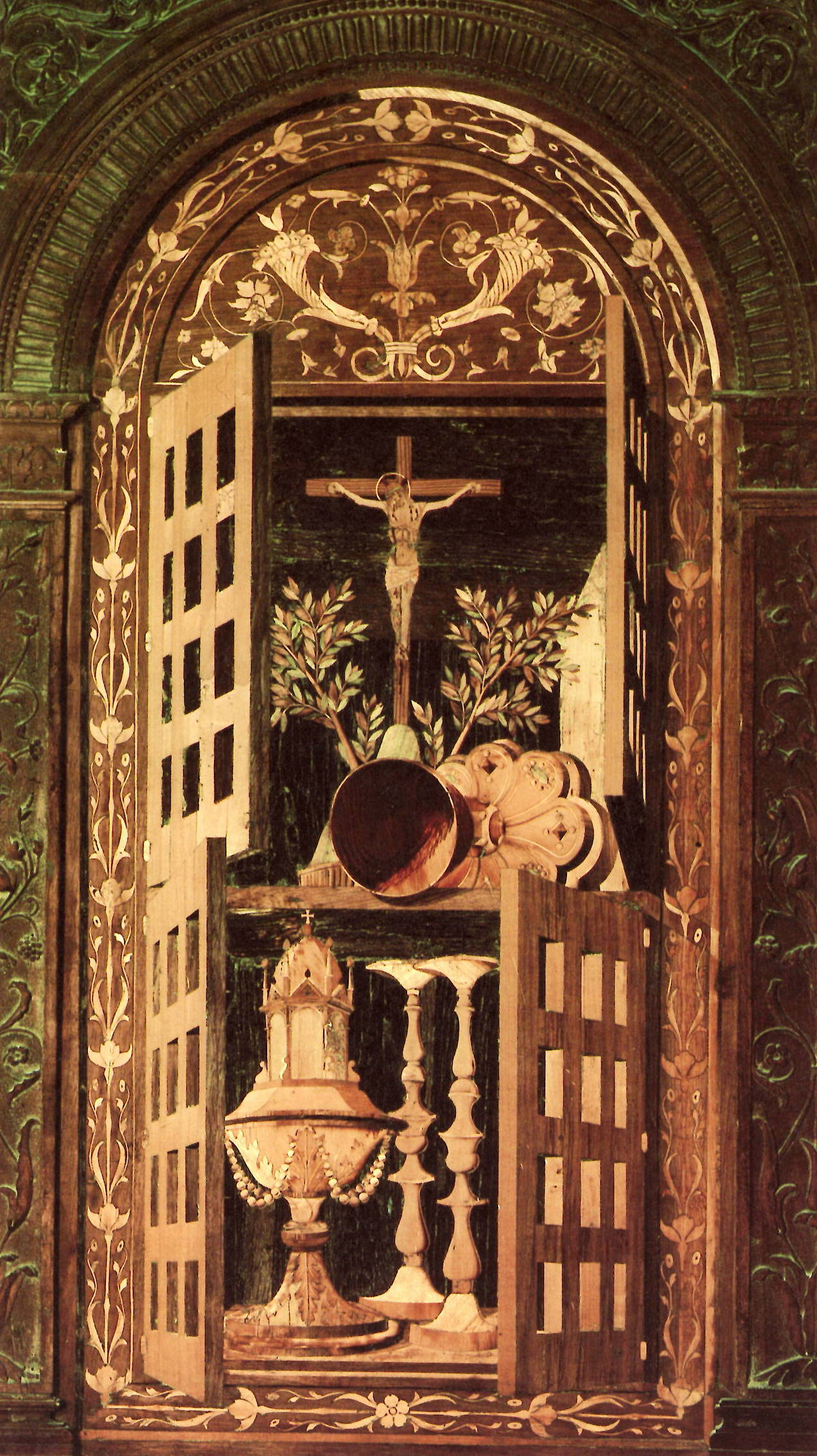
Crucifix and shield of the Olivetan order, 1497-1499, Santa Maria in Organo, Verona

His renown today rests primarily on his work at Santa Maria in Organo. Completed in 1499, the choir stalls consist of two rows featuring numerous elaborately crafted seats. The intarsia work depicts landscapes, partially open bookcases containing a variety of objects, including liturgical and astronomical instruments, books, writing implements, candles and musical instruments. The ensemble also includes a lectern with a three-sided intarsia-decorated base, featuring two open antiphonaries and a decorative frieze adorned with cornucopias and putti.

While the altarpieces in the side chapels of the choir have been partially destroyed, the large carved paschal candlestick has survived. Standing at over four metres tall, it features intricate reliefs, garlands of fruit and chimera figures supporting saints and angels. The highly elaborate wall panelling in the sacristy is designed features carved ornaments and intarsia depicting classically inspired scenes such as Roman amphitheatres. The columns are adorned with representations of tools, trophies and decorative motifs.

Vasari recognised Fra Giovanni’s importance and praised his role in the development of the art of intarsia. Not only did Giovanni da Verona surpass his predecessors, he also perfected existing techniques, such as the use of acids and pigments for staining and dyeing wood. Other strengths of Giovanni da Verona included his meticulous execution and clear designs. His work often influenced local artistic traditions, leaving his mark in many different places.

Besides chour stalls, Fra Giovanni produced various other wooden objects, including a paschal candlestick and a bookcase for the monastery of Monte Oliveto Maggiore. He was also an accomplished manuscript illuminator, but only a few traces of the miniatures he created for 20 choir books survive. A marble group depicting the Madonna and Child in the de profundis room at Monte Oliveto Maggiore is sometimes attributed to him. Giovanni had numerous pupils, including Antonio Preposito and Fra Vincenzo dalle Vacche.

== Gallery ==
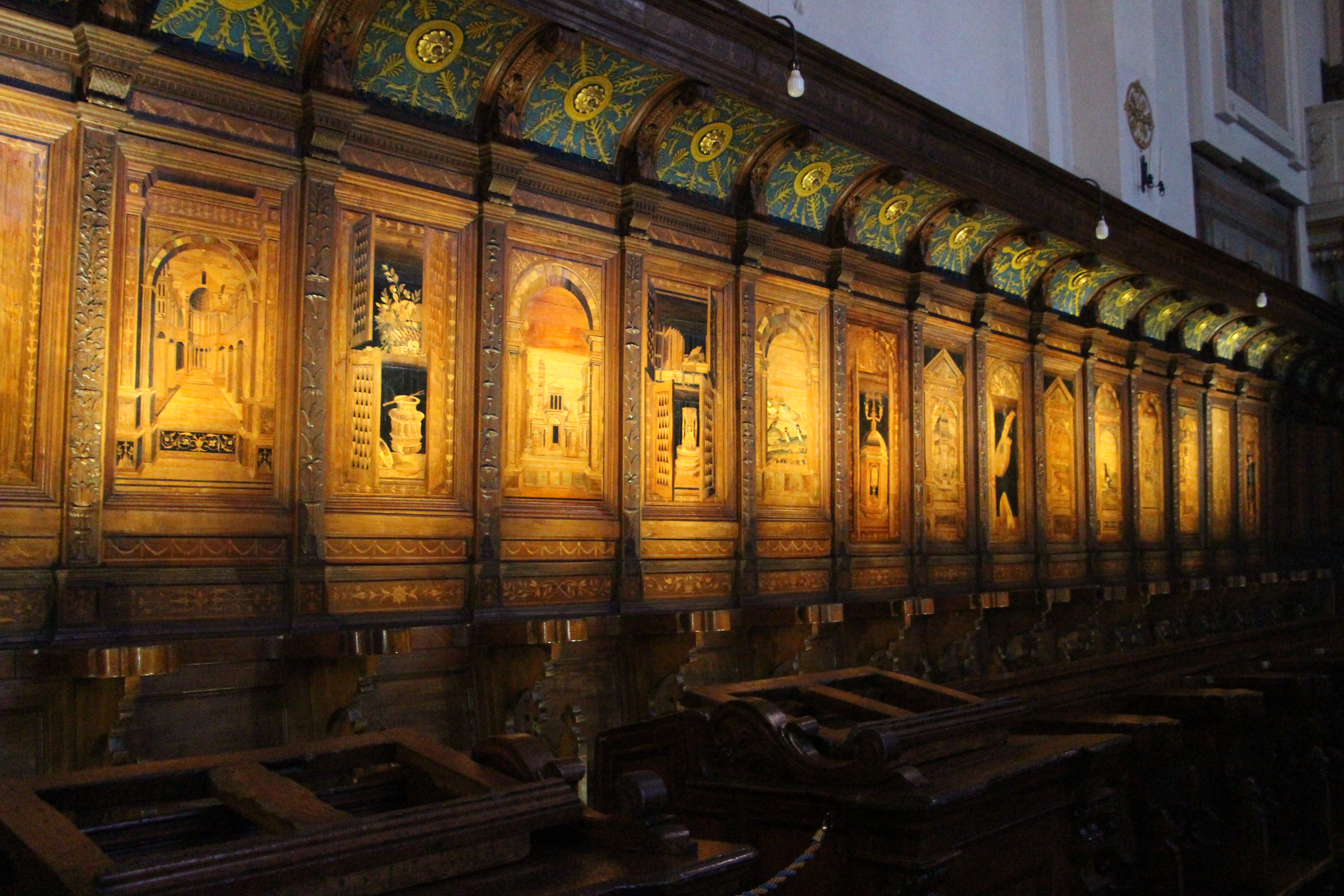
Choir stalls of the monastery of Monte Oliveto Maggiore, realized by Fra Giovanni between 1502-1504

Intarsia panel depicting geometrical solids, 1502-1504, Monte Oliveto Maggiore

Intarsia panel in the choir of Sant'Anna dei Lombardi, c. 1506

Choir and lectern of Siena Cathedral, 1502-1504

== Bibliography ==
- Darmstaedter, Robert (1986). Künstlerlexikon. Über 4400 Künstler von der Antike bis zur Gegenwart (in German). Herrsching: Pawlak. p. 277. ISBN 3-88199-300-2.
- Rognini, Luciano (2001). "Giovanni da Verona". Dizionario Biografico degli Italiani (in Italian). Vol. 56: Giovanni Di Crescenzio–Giulietti. Rome: Institute of the Italian Encyclopaedia. ISBN 978-88-12-00032-6.
- Carminati, Marco (2003). "Giovanni da Verona, Fra". Grove Art Online. Oxford: Oxford University Press. doi:10.1093/gao/9781884446054.article.T032511.
