= Palazzo Orsini di Gravina =

Building in Naples, Italy

Coordinates: 40.845237°N 14.251462°E

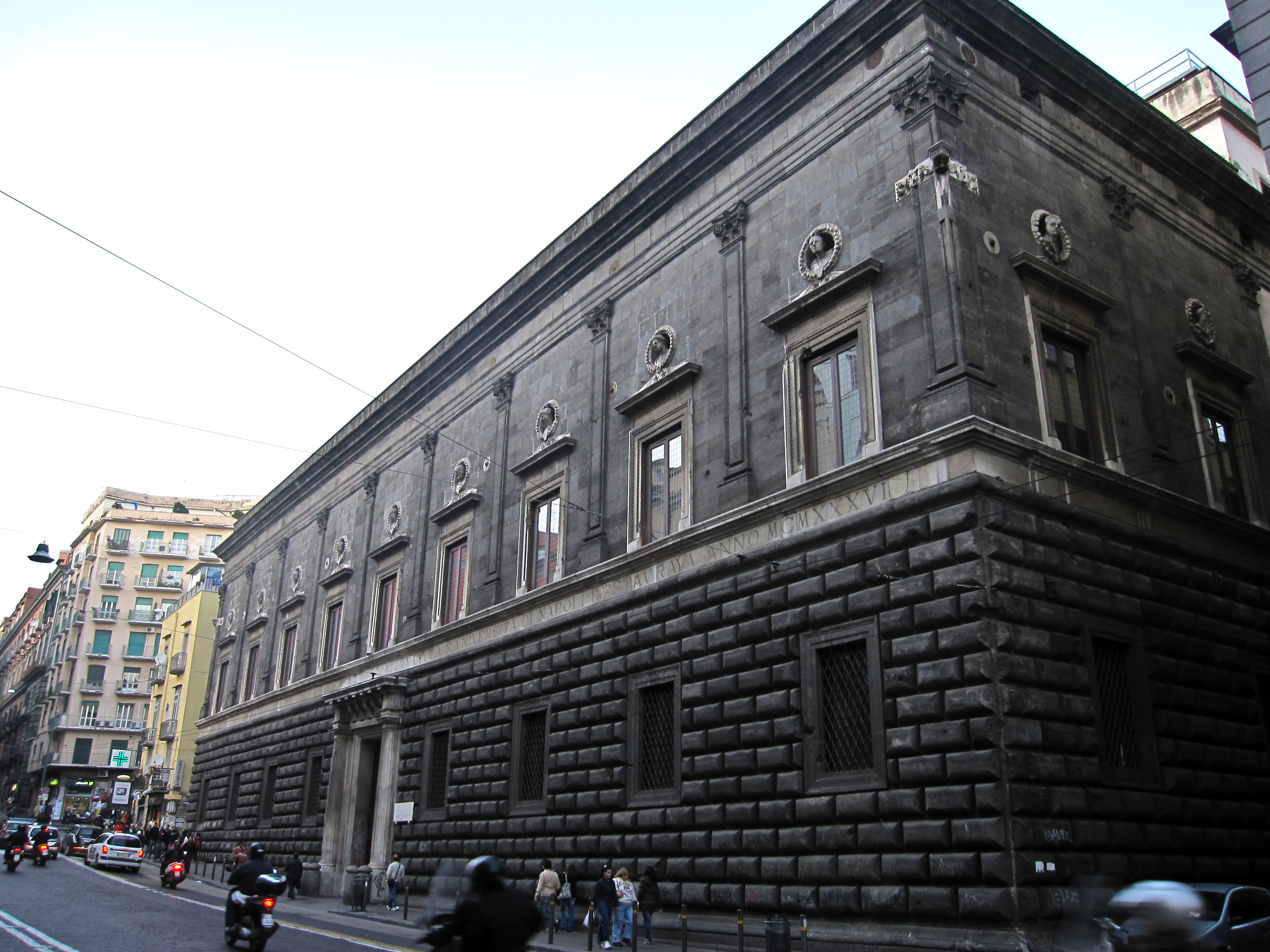
The façade of palace Orsini di Gravina.

The Palazzo Orsini di Gravina is a Renaissance-style palace on number 3 Via Monteoliveto, in the San Lorenzo quarter of Rione San Giuseppe-Carità, of central Naples, Italy. Since 1940, it has housed the Faculty of Architecture of the University of Naples. It is located across the street and a few doors north of the sleek and modern Palazzo delle Poste (Post Office). Across the street at the north end of the palace, is the Piazza Monteoliveto with its Fountain and the church of Sant'Anna dei Lombardi.

== History ==
The palace was commissioned by the nobleman Ferdinando Orsini, who acquired lands from the nearby Santa Chiara. The first two stories of the façade were built from 1513 to 1549. The palace has changed hands many times over the centuries, and with some interludes, was linked with the prominent Orsini family till the 19th century. One of the members of the family became Pope Benedict XIII in 1724. From there it passed to private hands and to the Bourbon monarchy, and became government offices, till becoming part of the University.

At the turn of the 16th and 17th century, the palace drew curious travelers and scholars from across Europe, all eager to view more than 12,000 "natural curiosities" assembled by Ferrante Imperato.

== Architecture ==
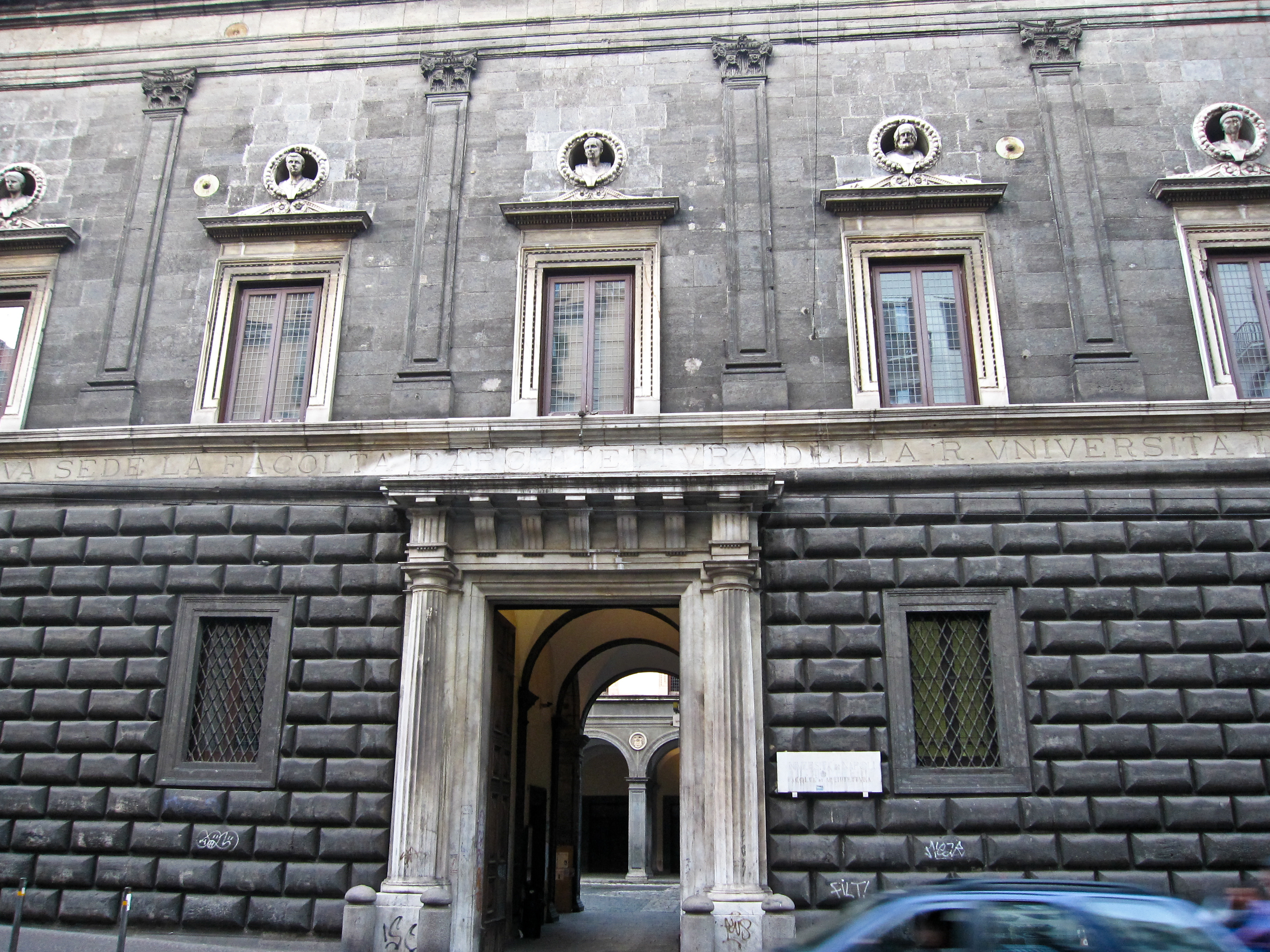
Detail of Entrance

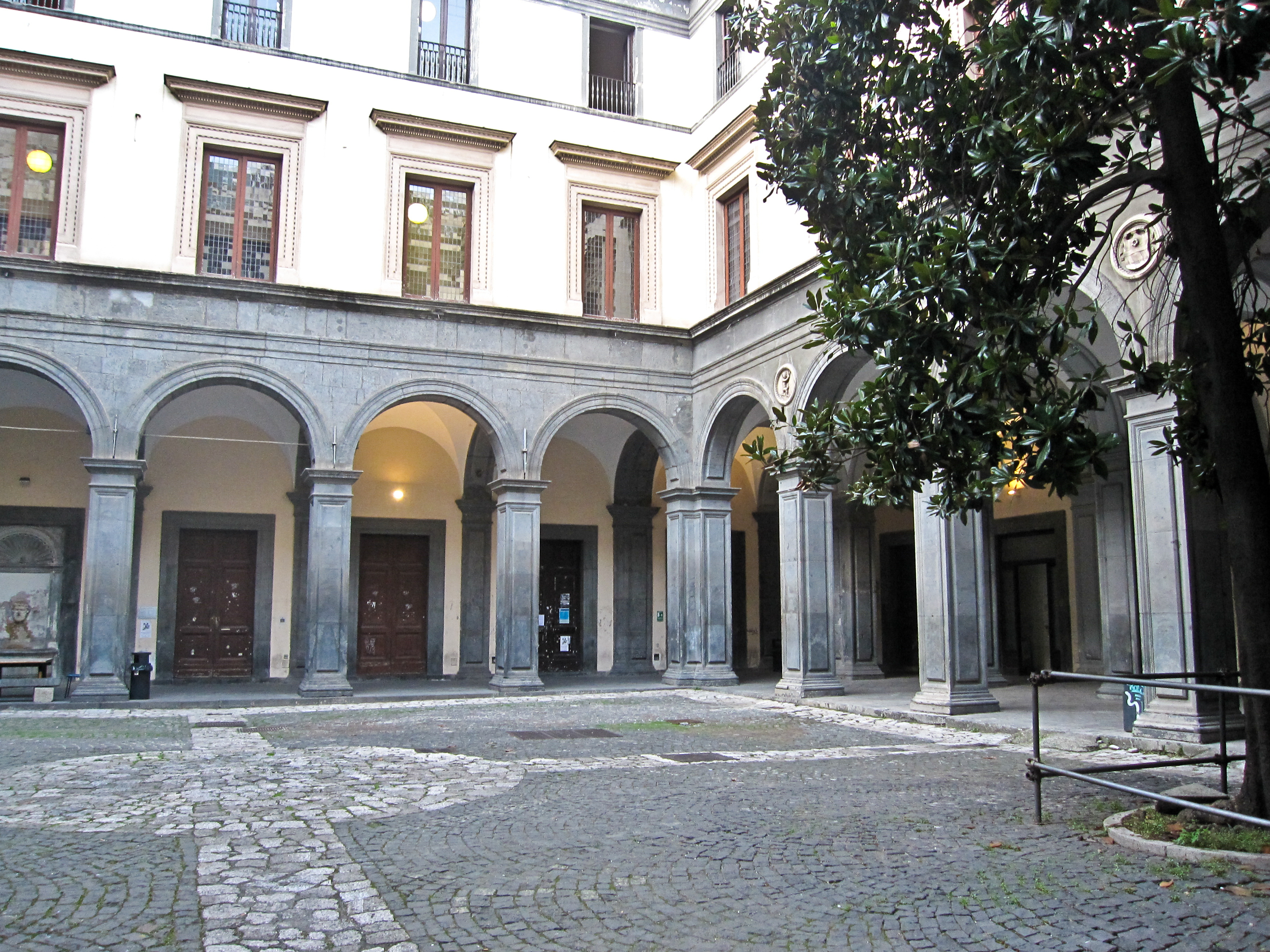
Courtyard

The original architect is not certain, although sources claim the architect was the little known Gabriele d'Angelo. It is known that Giovanni Francesco di Palma worked on some of the external decorations during 1548 and 1549.

The main facade, on Via Monteoliveto, has a rusticated stone brick base for a first floor. The second floor has marble-framed windows surmounted by circular niches with busts. The tall windows rise on a marble cornice, and are separated by Piperno rock pilasters with mixed doric-corinthian capitals. The ensemble breaths an elegant sobriety akin to that of contemporary palaces in Rome, such as the Palazzo Vidoni Caffarelli.

The entrance portal was designed and built by Mario Gioffredo in 1766. During this time, the interior was frescoed by Giuseppe Bonito, Francesco de Mura, and Fedele Fischetti. In addition, a fourth wing to close the central courtyard was completed. The palace underwent restorations after a fire during the revolution of 1848 severely damaged the palace; the architect was Gaetano Genovesi. A third floor with balconies was added in the 19th century; these were removed in the 20th century and the circular niches with busts restored.
