= Stefano Veltroni =

Italian painter

Stefano Veltroni (16th century) was an Italian painter of the Renaissance period. He was a relation of Giorgio Vasari, and accompanied him as an assistant to Naples, Bologna, and Florence.
