= Arts town =

Town with art as a cultural identity

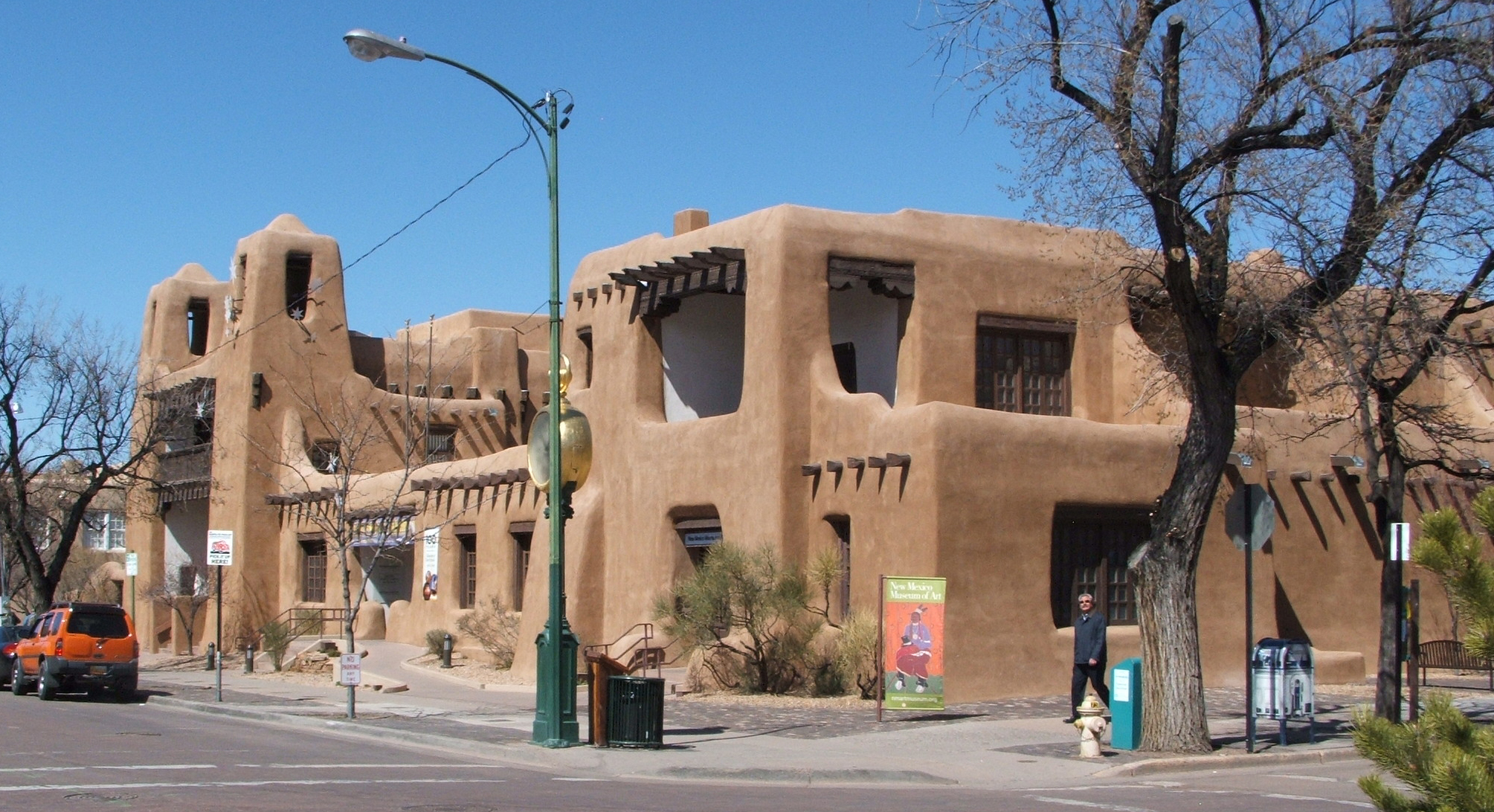
New Mexico Museum of Art in Santa Fe, New Mexico

An arts town (also called a arts city, or with art singular) is a settlement that is dedicated to and recognized as having art as a central feature to its cultural identity. Arts towns generate a good portion of their economy, their existence, and their tourism from establishing a culture of the arts. By definition, a disproportionately large number of the citizens in these towns are involved in the arts.

Santa Fe, in New Mexico, is an example of an arts city in the United States, with over 5,000 artists living within city limits, year round arts events, art institutions including 10 museums and 100 galleries, as well as classes, educational seminars, and conferences. Further towns of art, as the Europeans designate them, include such internationally famous cities such as Florence, in Tuscany, Italy, the heritage home of renaissance art and of Michelangelo and Leonardo.

The term similarly is used for centers for arts festivals like Tanglewood or such small towns as Nelsonville, Ohio, that have dedicated themselves to an artistic identity based on traditional ceramics and folk-art centered on an arts oriented town square.

== History ==
Going back several millennia, in the progression of civic history, emerging towns or cities have taken different cultural courses. Certain towns or cities have deliberately attempted to put forward a presence in which culture ranged high above other achievements in military strength, or in manufacturing, or in strategic importance.

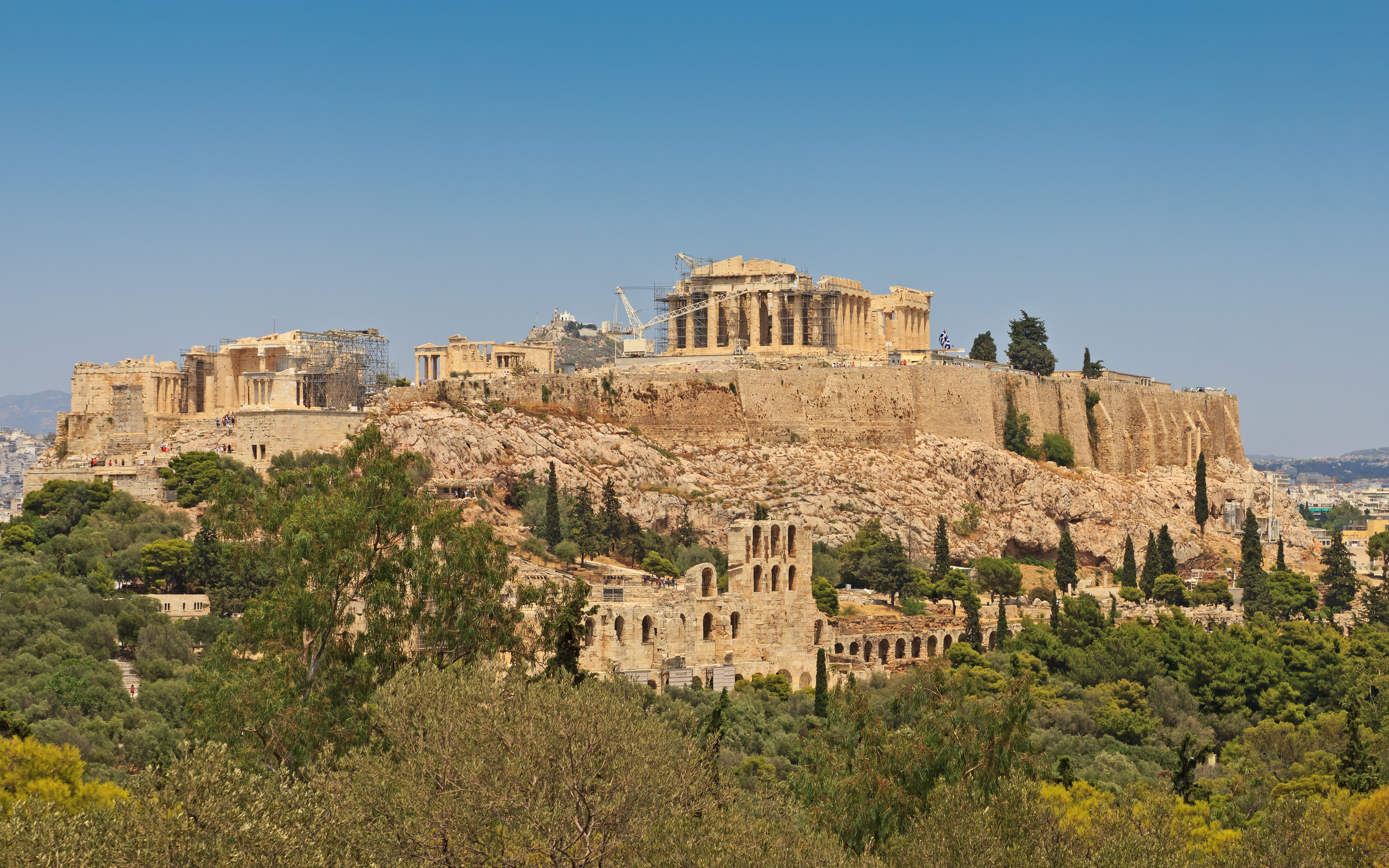
View from Philopappos Hill in Athens (Attica, Greece) — Acropolis of Athens

Perhaps the best example is Athens in Greece as the first widely known arts town, acting in opposition to Sparta a quintessential examplar of anti-cultural town development in that Spartan citizens were forbidden non-military pursuits and occupations.

Athens has since provided the inspiration for countless imitations in civic development. Hellenism and Hellenistic ideas have driven countless cities to imitate this city driven by arts, populated by artists, and artisans, and with a strong local, regional, and international influence on arts.

Alexandria, Constantinople, and many medieval Italian city-states, such as Ferrara, Naples, Palermo, Bologna and Perugia are examples of Arts towns.

With the onset of industrialism in Victorian times, a small revival of arts towns was influenced by William Morris in the UK; and by arts idealists such as Thoreau and Walt Whitman in America, and brought into fulfillment by architects such as Frank Lloyd Wright whose influence on supporting the artisan class, their folkish arts, and their use of natural local materials, led to rural revivals of arts towns since the 1970s.

== Key elements of arts towns ==
Arts towns have at least ten primary clusters that define them.

These include an area of arts density considered the centre of the town which would contain multiple: art galleries that also host art walks; crafts workshops that use local materials; theaters and theater group facilities, folk-arts training and exhibition facilities; cafes with locally produced art items; at least three to five arts cooperatives; historical buildings that have undergone proper renovation and kept their character with historical interpretation; at least two or three arts foundations offices; an arts council that works with town planners and the city council; and daily classes in the arts that involve many of the townsfolk, and draw students and tourists for seminars.

Most typically, these towns also have a ratio of one museum per 2,000 citizens.

Recognition by surveys of the towns having an artistic tourist draw is also important. In some countries arts towns are given an official designation by national cultural authorities.

== Contemporary arts towns ==
=== In the United States ===
Globally, tourists recognize at least twenty cities, towns, or villages as arts towns. In America there are at least 100 towns that are regularly cited, in Canada 10.

Such a list would include towns famous for theatrical events (Stratford, Niagara on the Lake), musical events (Tanglewood, Woodstock), high concentrations of artisans working in one artistic area (Nelsonville, Ohio; Northport, Alabama; Portland, Maine; Oxford, Mississippi; Brattleboro, Vermont); or which host large numbers of artists, actors, or writers (Nantucket, Martha's Vineyard, Northampton, Provincetown, in Massachusetts).

Certain university towns that are in rural areas, through sheer number of cultural events, as well have achieved world reputations as arts towns (Ithaca, NY; Chapel Hill, NC; Taos, New Mexico; Yellow Springs, Ohio; and Jackson, Wyoming).

=== In Canada ===
The most recognized arts towns in Canada are: Stratford, Ontario, home of the Stratford Festival of Canada and a large Shakespearean theatrical community; and Niagara-on-the-Lake, Ontario, home of the Shaw Festival, preserving the work of George Bernard Shaw and other Edwardian playwrights, such as Galsworthy, restored 18th and 19th century buildings with historical interpretation; and classes in costume and drama, academic conferences, and year-round arts initiatives, all in a town with five museums and a population under 14,000.

In Banff, the Banff Centre for the Arts is the key element that allows in a very small town, the capacity for a short film festival with an emphasis on animation; arts and crafts festivals, facilities for a large number of artisans who have rejuvenated a formerly isolated rural community into a global arts centre. And to which artists who live in subsidized nearby retreats for month-long residencies create new works in music, theatre, literary translations, and multi-media by providing synergy within an artistic community.

=== In Europe ===
The EEC has developed designations of "cities of the arts" for towns and smaller cities having historic and artistic importance based on UNESCO studies for over twenty years as part of the sustainable cities initiative.
