= Accona Desert =

Geographical feature in Italy

Coordinates: 43°11′44.19″N 11°34′22.43″E

The Accona Desert refers to a hilly area in the Siena province of Italy, within the municipality of Asciano [43°14'4.30"N; 11°33'37.48"E]. The term is often used to include the Biancana site of Le Fiorentine - Leonina [ 43°17'32.95”N; 11°26'54.07"E]. Despite its name, its climate is Mediterranean, with a hot, dry summer and almost 800 mm/y of rain (Csa Köppen climate classification).

A real desert has never existed here. However, there have been temporarily severely eroded areas, more properly called "badlands".

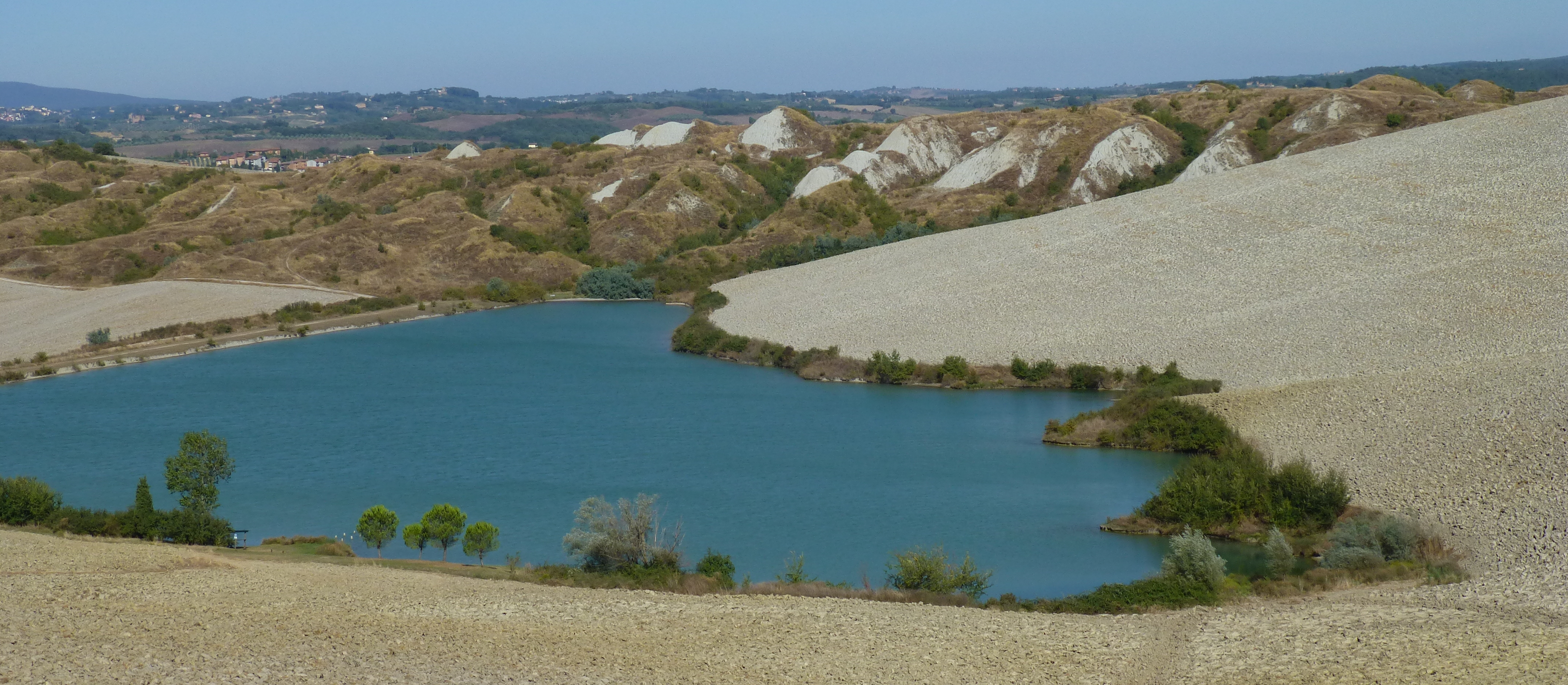
View of the slope of Le Fiorentine from the crossroads between Leonina and Mucigliani, during the 2014-27 study campaign - The plowed slopes were covered with biancane still in 1968–69 as is shown by scenes from the Monicelli Brancaleone at the Crusades

Two main types of badlands can be found in the area of the Crete Senesi, the Valdorcia, and the Volterra areas of Tuscany: Biancana (from Bianco, white, due to the light color of the clay and of the saline efflorescence) and calanco (local name for a type of gully or ravine). Both are linked to gully erosion processes, the former intermingled mainly with subsurface erosion and the latter with mass movements. Biancanas can also be found in Basilicata and in Calabria. The calanco landscape is common all along the Apennines and in many parts of the Alps. Both calancos and biancanas were used as grazing ground, with an almost annual burning of the vegetation to remove brush and favor herbaceous cover more palatable for sheep, goats, and cattle. Both practices were abandoned in the 1990s to favor measures to preserve biodiversity and geo forms under the EU Natura 2000 program. Conservation has almost stopped erosion in both types of badlands and vegetation now covers the majority of the area that was once bare slopes. As there is a strong interrelationship between vegetation biodiversity and erosion/deposition processes, biodiversity is also threatened and the biancana landscape is forecast to disappear entirely within 20–40 years as brush cover expands. Spots where the traditional forms can still be observed are scattered in the Crete Senesi and the Valdorcia, included within the quadrangle of vertices [43°16'10.58"N; 11°15'59.30”E], [43°18'28.68”N; 11°39'4.92”E], [42°43'32.58”N; 11°42'22.98”E], [42°45'49.22”N; 11°58'41.90”E]. Leonina and Lucciola Bella [43° 2'4.85"N; 11°45'35.75"E] are two of the best sites for walking through the biancanas, while Chiusure - Monte Oliveto Maggiore (i.e., the ancient Accona) and Radicofani [42°55'8.14"N; 11°44'38.82"E] host the most impressive calancos.

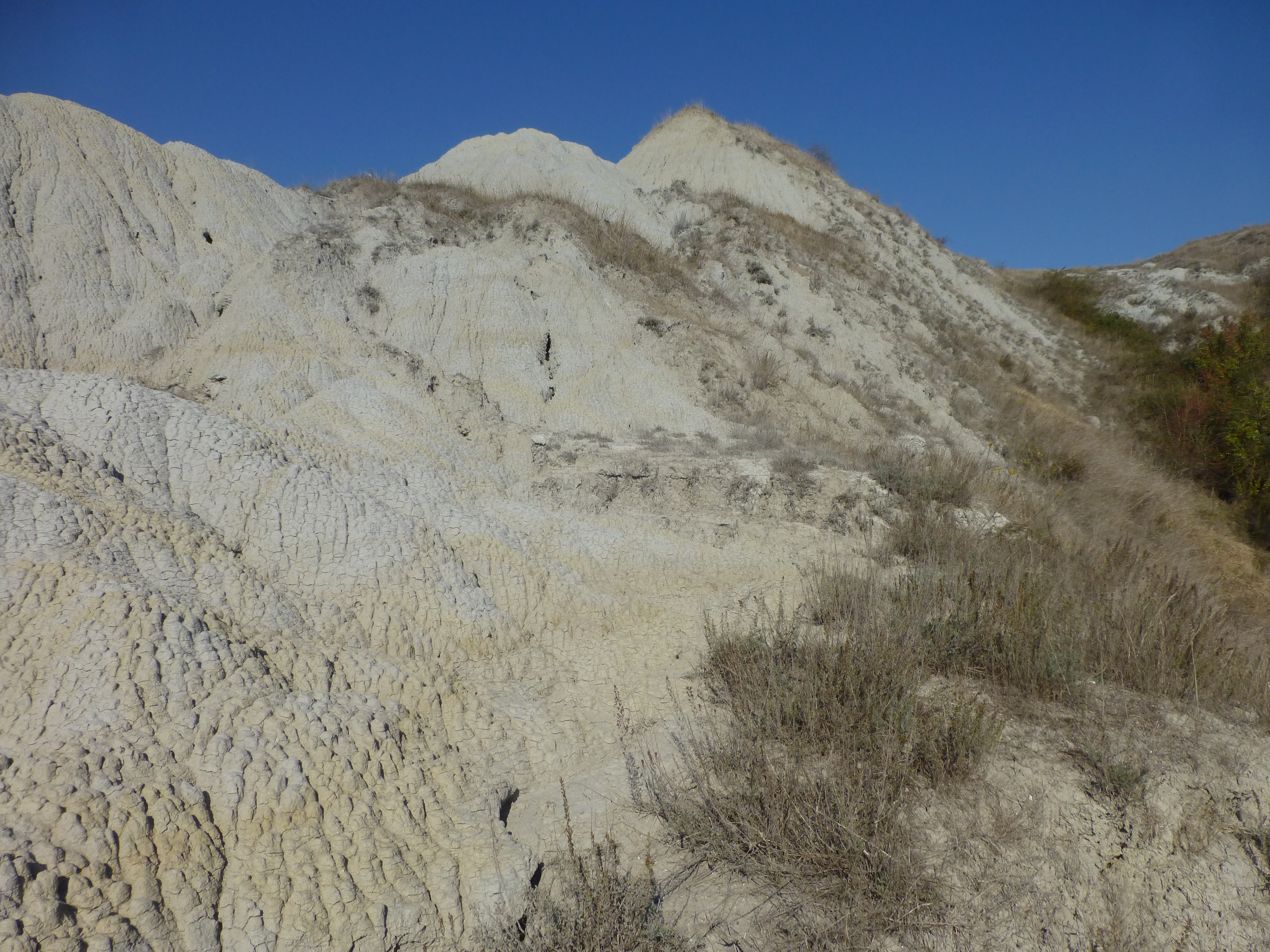
Close view of some biancanas in the Leonina site

== History ==
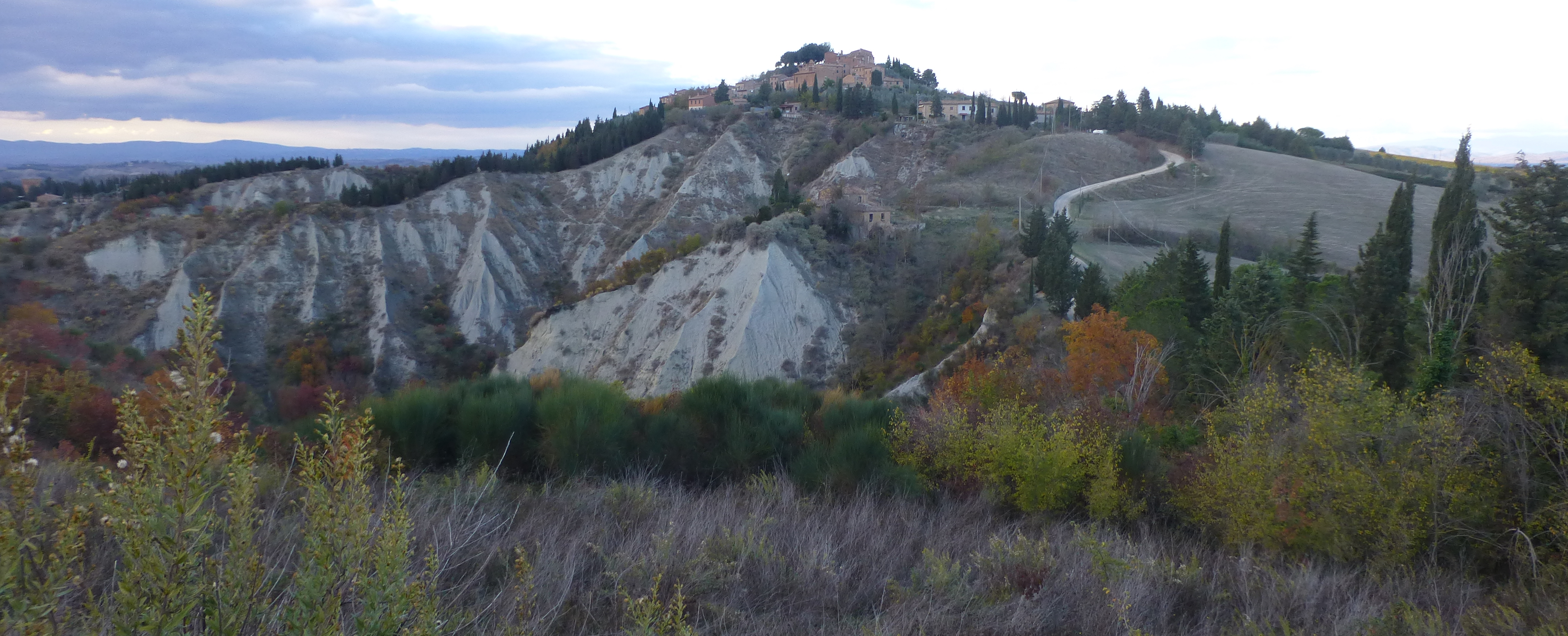
View of the gully heads (calanchi) undercutting the medieval center of Chiusure (Asciano). To the far left is visible the tower at the entrance of the Abbey of Monte Oliveto Maggiore (the original Accona site)

Archaeological maps of the Siena province show that the Crete Senesi area was inhabited in Etruscan and Roman times. Almost every slope contains remnants of that period. The periods of the Barbarian invasions, the Gothic wars, and the Justinian plague caused a demographic decline which reduced the anthropic impact on the environment and favored the natural reforestation of the area. Nevertheless, in the seventh century Asciano was already a Curtis Regia. It was a village with a territory where agriculture and animal husbandry coexisted with hunting reserves used by the Lombard lords. In the 10th century, documents show Leonina, too, as Curtis. Other rudimentary documentation testifies to the existence of a settlement in Leonina. At the time of the Black Death, (1348 with several returns of the plague in the following 60–70 years) Leonina's population halved from more than 150–160 to about 60 at the beginning of 1400. This fate was common to Siena, Asciano and the whole territory of the Sienese Republic: Siena's population fell from about 50,000 before the Black Death to 14–16,000 in 1400-1450 (Ginatempo, 1990) and returned to pre-plague levels only at the end of the 20th century.

Asciano, with its surroundings, was a major town in the Sienese territory for a long time and contributed to the Republic's economy in a substantial way, gaining Sienese citizenship in 1369.

A few kilometers south of Asciano, the small town of Chiusure grew around the seventh century church of Sant'Angelo in Luco, even though the hill on which the village is located would have been threatened by the approach of the heads of large (and deep) gully systems retreating upslope. It had an economy mainly based on agriculture and animal husbandry. Chiusure's importance is due mainly to its proximity to Accona about 1 km away. The members of three leading Sienese families (Tolomei, Patrizi, and Piccolomini) founded in 1313 what became the Benedictine monastery of Monte Oliveto Maggiore (1320–1344) on the site of the Tolomei's Accona podere (farm). Pope Pius II (Enea Piccolomini) visited the monastery during his papacy (1458–1464) and described the area as rich in olive trees, fruit trees, almonds, vines, orchards, small cypress woods, oaks and junipers. Furthermore, Pius II added, there was water: a perennial spring, wells, tanks, and cisterns.

From this time until 1796, the monastery played a leadership role in the spheres of economy and spirituality. The area has churches, monasteries, and farms. Then, under French rule from 1797 all the Church possessions were confiscated and sold. Only after the Restoration did the Olivetan Benedictines recover the Monastery of Monte Oliveto and slowly resume their role as local leaders.

=== Anthropic influence ===
The Crete Senesi lie on top of Plio-Pleistocene silty-clay over consolidated marine deposits rich in sodium. Deep, narrow cracks (joints;) cut the deposits to about 10m from the surface, favoring localized water infiltration and the excavation of subterranean tunnels. In natural, unstressed conditions, soils can develop as deep as 1.5 m, with removal of sodium by the leaching action of infiltration water. The present situation is characterized by the presence of eroded or poorly developed soils especially in the badlands. Intense animal activities (trampling, overgrazing) and anthropic activities (deforestation, tillage operations, exposure of bare soil surface to weather agents on excessively sloping grounds) favor surface soil erosion, causing small rivulets, rills and gullies. The rate of soil erosion varies from zero to 1–2 mm of soil removed yearly. If gullies are excavated by concentrating overland flow, erosion values in a field can attain 2–4 mm of soil loss in a single rain event. Excessive animal grazing facilitates gully erosion, soil slips and mass movements. Cropland management requires tillage (deep ploughing, seed bed preparation) and sometimes large earth movements. All these activities cause a net movement of soil from the upslope side of the field to the downslope side. Soil in the upslope side of the field is lost at rates between 1 and 4 cm yearly. For medieval tilling techniques, the estimated erosion rate would have been around 2 cm/year. Considering an alternation of years with and without ploughing, 300 years would have been enough to expose the subsoil still rich in sodium. Sodium gives dispersive characteristics to the clay, making it very erodible, hence increasing the velocity of rain-induced erosion.

The first half of the fourteenth century was characterized by social unrest due to the transformation from farmers who owned their land to large land holdings with the property subdivided into poderi. Each poderi was managed by a farmer (mezzadro) and his family living on the fields in a crop sharing system. At the same time foreign armies (e.g. Henry VII's, mercenaries) passing through the Sienese territory interfered with normal activities in the countryside. Hence, erosion and floods are testified in several documents, including t Lorenzetti's Buongoverno frescos (1340) that show biancanas while severe floods are reported. The climate was characterized by droughts and extreme events that led to a shortage of food in Italy and necessitated imports from abroad. This forced Siena to invest a large part of its wealth in facing these difficulties, and divert funds from other priorities such as flood prevention.

In the second half of the 14th century the abrupt and large demographic decrease due to the plagues resulted in the farming population of small owners and mezzadri needing to manage twice as much livestock and land per capita. With no resources for maintenance, the only use for a severely eroded field was animal grazing. Hence, the eroded fields became irrecoverable. The lack of personnel persisted for about two centuries during which the eroded areas expanded, reaching a maximum in the 19th century.

This picture is substantially confirmed by soil denudation rates estimated using average erosion in the basin of the river Ombrone, which drains the area, and on the denudation rates of the two largest biancanas of the Leonina site and the gully in between.

Biancana badlands reclamation began at the end of the 19th century and ended during the second half of the 20th century when bulldozers removed almost all the biancanas and some of the smallest calancos, encouraged by EU subsidies then available under the Common Agricultural Policy. Thus it can be said that damage mainly due to an epidemic (Black Death) was eventually solved by the EU-CAP of 1960–2000.

The natural and social history of the Crete Senese does not leave much room, either temporal or spatial, for any physical desert. Nevertheless, there certainly were large areas that progressively became severely eroded and devoid of vegetation. The Accona podere when Bernardo Tolomei retired there in 1313 may have been in poor condition, certainly without any mezzadro. Hence, in all likelihood, the desert of Accona referred at first to the absence of farmers in Accona and/or the lack of strong spiritual leadership, a role that the Olivetans had filled. Later, between 1830 and 1850 when the badlands were at their maximum, the label "Accona desert" was adopted by scholars and learned persons to convey the feeling of desolation felt when in the midst of the biancana fields or the calanco gullies.

== See also ==
- Province of Siena
- Badlands
