= Arbia =

Arbia may refer to:

- Arbia (river), a torrent in Tuscany, central Italy, a tributary of the river Ombrone
- Arbia, Asciano, a town in Tuscany, central Italy, administratively a frazione of the comune of Asciano, province of Siena
