= Emö Simonyi =

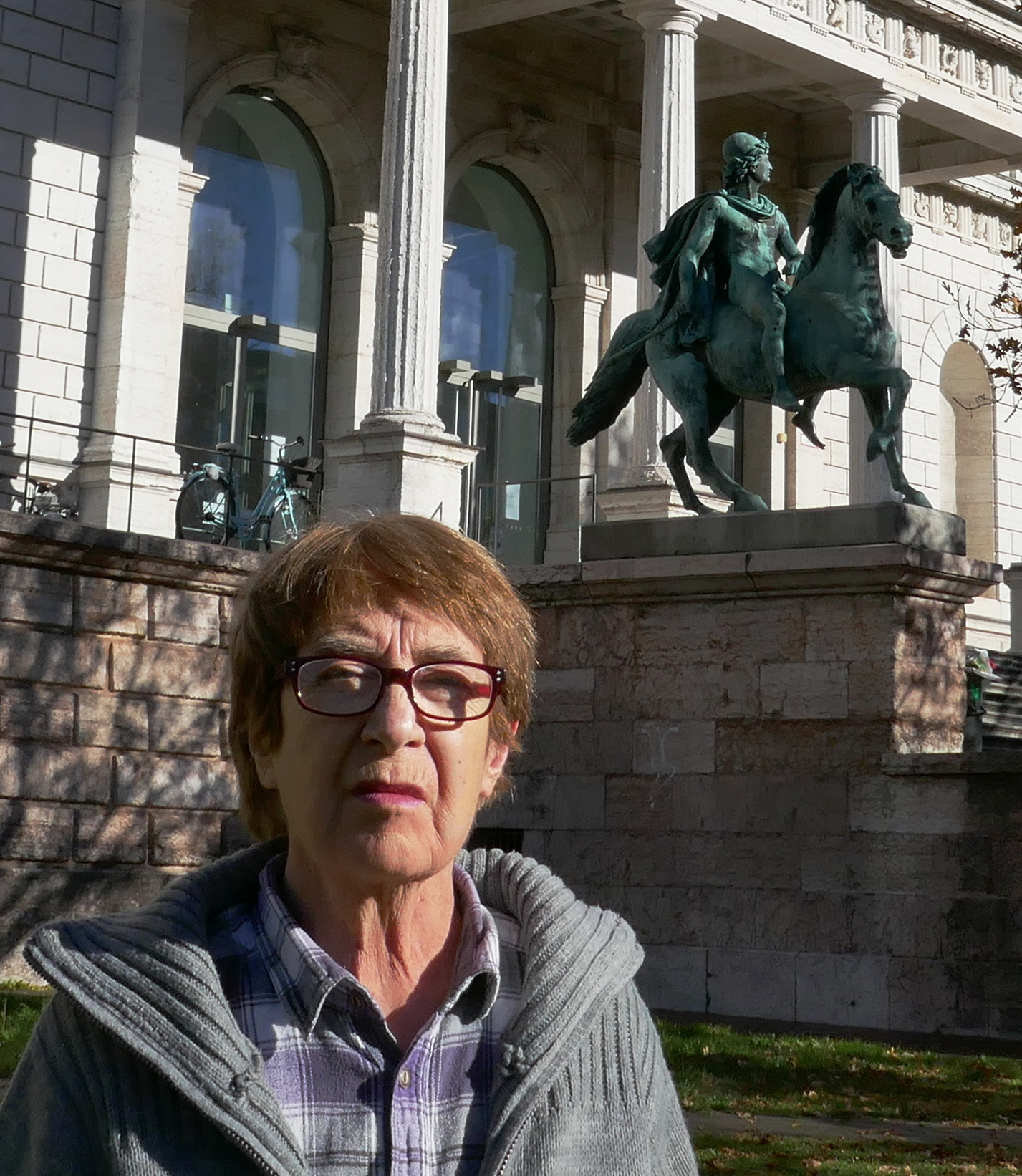
Emö Simonyi 2020 in front of the Academy of Fine Arts in Munich

Emö Simonyi (Hungarian: Simonyi Emő, Hungarian pronunciation: [ˈʃimoɲi ˈɛmøː]; born 2 July 1943) is a Hungarian-German painter and graphic artist.

== Life and education ==
Emö Simonyi was born on 2 July 1943 in Budapest, Hungary. She studied painting and graphic arts the Hungarian University of Fine Arts from 1961 to 1967 where she was a student of the painters Jenő Barcsay, György Kádár and György Konecsni. In 1967, she received her diploma in painting and graphic arts, after which she worked freelance as a graphic artist, designing posters, advertising graphics, and industrial pavilions. Since 1971, she has been living and working in Germany; in 1988 she received the promotional prize "Förderpreis" of the City of Munich and started her Evangelists series with its recurring themes of human-animal hybrids. In 1990, she participated in the Goethe-Institut's Indo-German Artist's Camp in Calcutta; in 1991, she received a one-year working grant "Studio aperto Italia" in San Giovanni d'Asso, Italy. From 1993 onwards, she taught "Anatomy for Artists" for 23 years at the Academy of Fine Arts in Munich and from 1995 to 2022 taught at the Academy for Performing and Visual Arts in Marburg. Between 1998 and 2009, she was Guest professor at Pentiment in Hamburg and made first experiments with paper sculptures made from cardboard cubes that were stacked and painted.

== Work ==
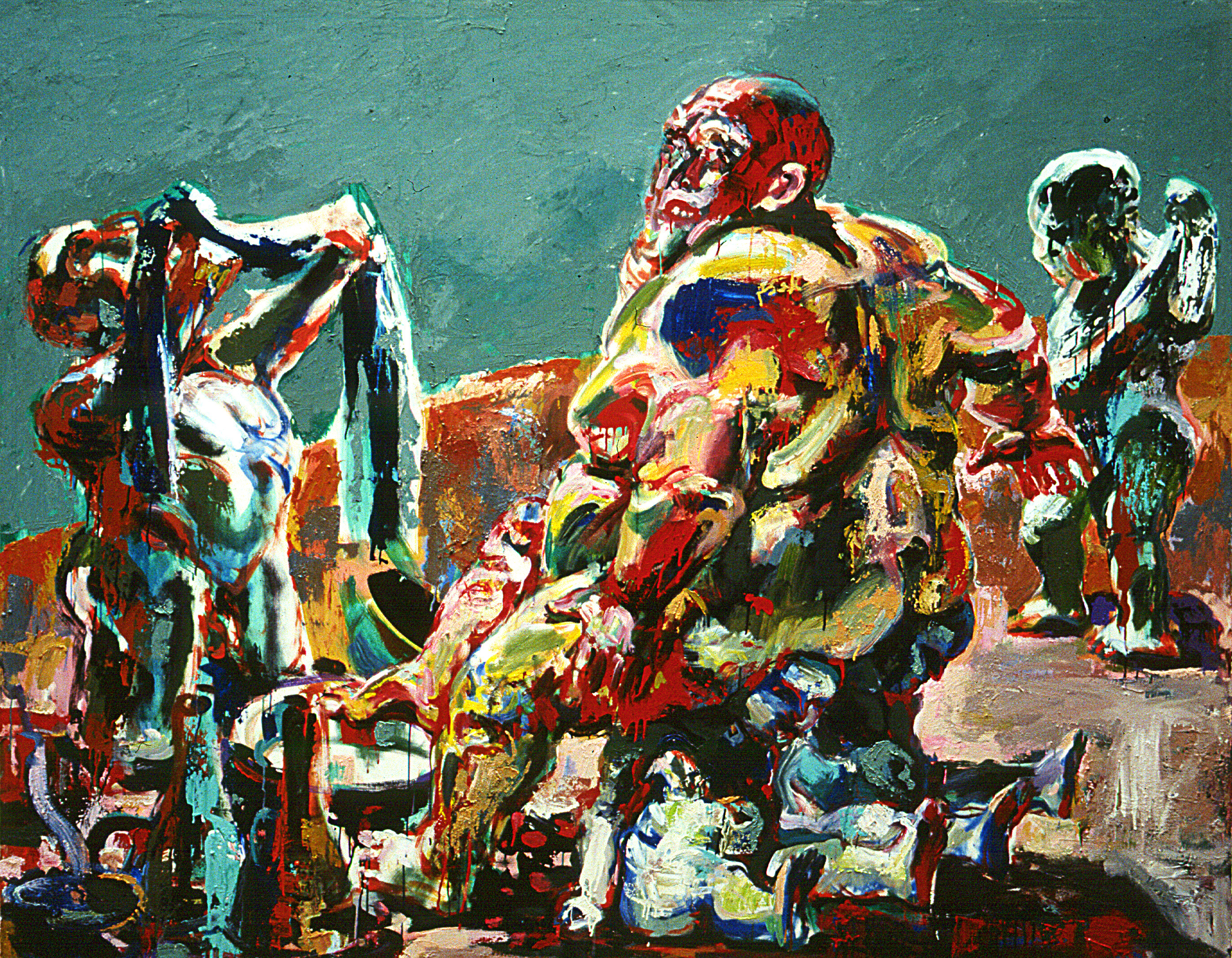
Voodoo, 1991, mixed media on canvas, 190 x 240 cm

After initially focusing on black-and-white graphics and drawings, Simonyi's work shifted in the 1970s to a free and intense style of oil painting. Her paintings are responses to lived experiences or products of the imagination, mostly large-format, intensely colorful, narratively expressive, and often painted from unusual perspectives. After 1998 her paper sculptures developed into an important and characteristic part of her artistic practice. She addresses current social and environmental problems without breaking with classical painting traditions.

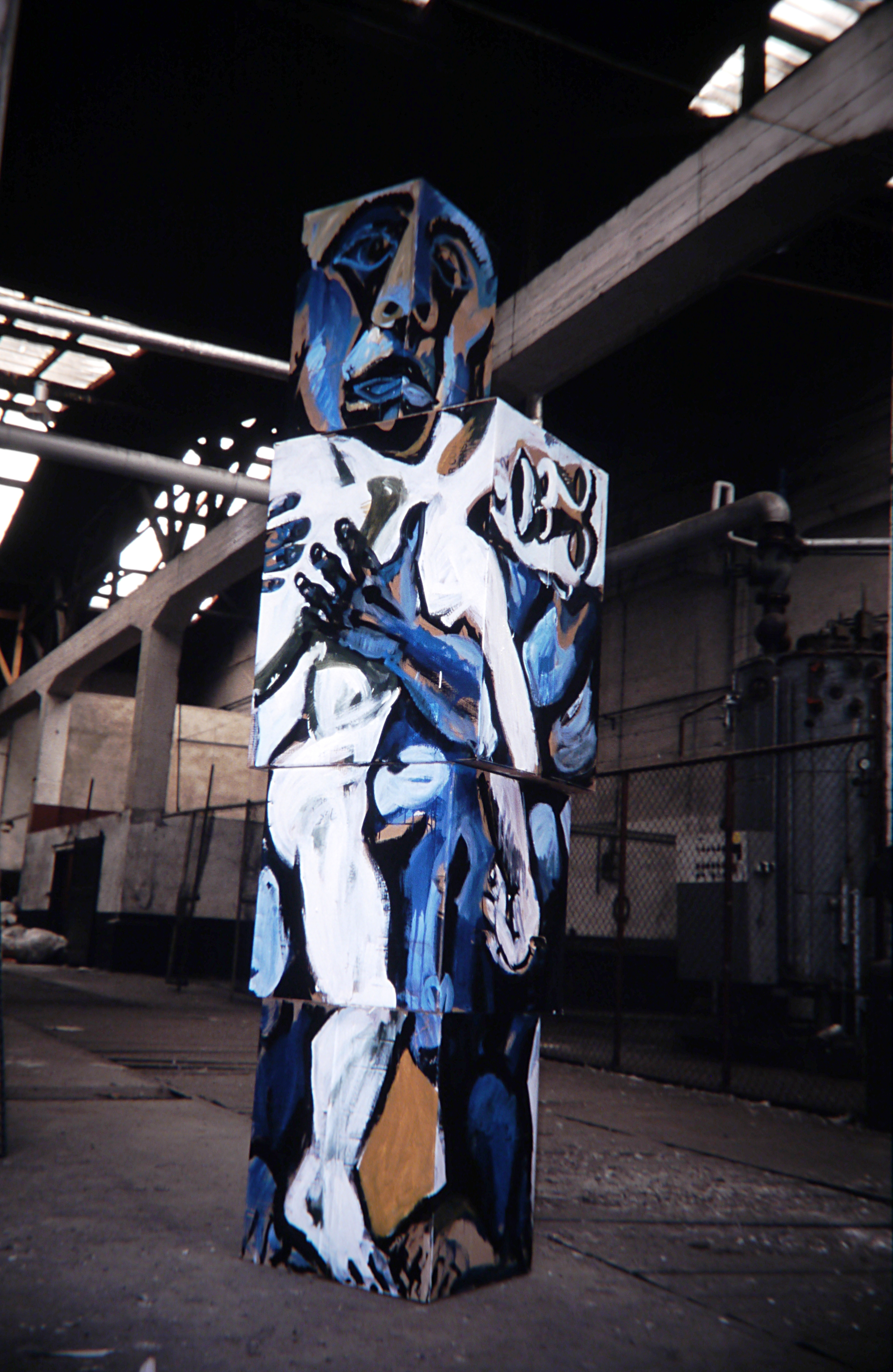
Fainting, 2001, painted cardboard, 280 x 90 x 90 cm

== Solo exhibitions (selection) ==
- 1979 Art Center, Hongkong
- 1992 Vasarely-Museum, Budapest
- 1992 Ernst-Museum, Budapest with Thomas Lange
- 1998 City Art Hall Szombathely, Hungary
- 2000 Budapest Galéria, Budapest
- 2005 Galerie Stadt Sindelfingen, Germany with Eckhard Froeschlin
- 2011 Templom Galéria, Eger, Hungary
- 2015 Kunsthaus Orplid, München; 2009, 2018 Orplid, Icking, Germany
- 2023 Galéria Lénia, Budapest
- 2024 Galerie13, Freising, Germany (1990, 93, 94, 97, 2004, 08, 12, 14, 19)
- 2026 Städtische Galerie Pfaffenhofen a. d. Ilm, Germany with Matthias Wurm

== Group exhibitions (selection) ==
- 1988 "Corpo", Progetto Civitella D´Agliano, Italy
- 1996 "visions of a new morning", Hambacher Schloß • Zeitgenössische Kunst aus "Israel & Deutschland"
- 2002 "Paperworks", Marburger Kunstverein, Marburg, Germany
- 2012 "Selbstverschiebung", Kunstverein Villa Streccius, Landau/Pfalz, Germany
- 2017 "Faktor X", 3. Biennale der Künstler im Haus der Kunst, München.
- 2021 "Metaphysical Passage Through a Zebra", Ludwig Museum Budapest.
- 2025 "WOMENS QUOTA 02", Ludwig Museum Budapest.

== Works in public collections ==
Simonyi's work is in the collection of the Ludwig-Museum, Budapest; Hungarian National Gallery; István Dobó Castle Museum, Eger, Hungary; Bavarian State Painting Collections, Munich; Academy of Arts, Berlin.
