= Lino Dinetto =

Italian painter (born 1927)

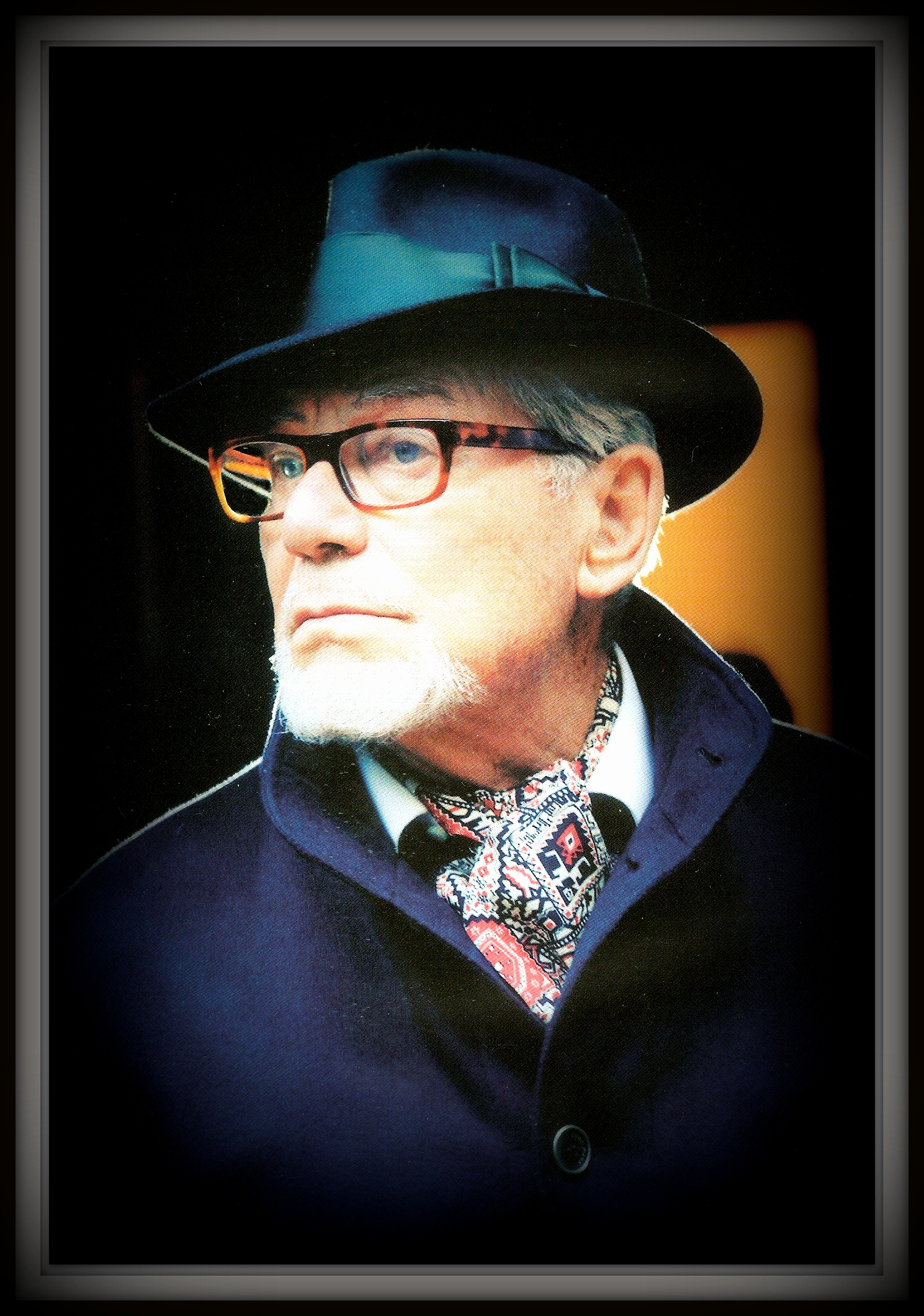
- Born: Lino Dinetto; 1 September 1927 (age 99); Este, Veneto, Italy
- Education: Studied in Venice; mentored by Mario Sironi and Carlo Carrà
- Known for: Mural painting, sacred art, metaphysical painting
- Notable work: I Porti; Il Cosmo
- Style: Metaphysical, Cubism, Symbolism,
- Awards: Grand National Prize, Punta del Este (1959); National Heritage Designation (Uruguay, 2004)

Lino Dinetto (born 1 September 1927) is an Italian painter, muralist and sculptor.

== Early life and education ==
Dinetto was born in Este, Veneto. He relegated his early middle school education to pursue an artistic studies. At the age of 15, he studied under painters painters Carlo Carrà and Mario Sironi, on topics including metaphysics and futurism.

== Career ==
In 1946, he was commissioned to recreate a 40-square-meter Last Supper mural at the Abbey of Monte Oliveto Maggiore in Tuscany, replacing a fresco destroyed during World War II.

In the early 1950s, Dinetto moved to Montevideo, Uruguay, where he spent nearly five years painting the interior of the Cathedral of San José which helped him gain recognition.

From 1955 to 1960 he was the director of the Painting and Drawing sections at the Instituto de Bellas Artes "S. Francisco".

During his time here, he began a series of paintings, starting with "The Ports" which earned him two first-prizes at the Salon Nacional. He then created "Il Cosmo" which earned him a National Grand Prix of Punta del Est in 1959. He was later honored by the São Paulo Museum of Modern Art which organized his own exhibitions in Brazil.

Dinetto returned to Italy in 1960 and continued his mural and stained-glass work. In 1964, he completed the "Monastic Stories" in the cloister of Santa Maria in Campis in Foligno after starting it a year beforehand. During this time he also travelled to Foligno, Monza, Mantua, and Rome.

== Exhibitions ==
Notable exhibitions include:

- Palazzo Trinci – Foligno (1962)
- "Exposicion de Jovenes Pintores Italianos" – Spain (1963)
- Giraldo Art Gallery – Treviso
- Campedel Gallery – Belluno
- National Exhibition of Art in Favor of the Third World – Florence
- Crystal Gallery – Cortina d'Ampezzo – Belluno
- Macchi Art Gallery – Pisa (1974)
- National Exhibition of Contemporary Art – Bolzano (1978)
- Diocesan Museum of Sacred Art – Venice (1983)
- "I padroni del tempo" (The Masters of Time) – Treviso (2002)
- "Aurum, tra sacro e profano" (Aurum, between sacred and profane) – Serravalle (2014)

In 2004, his body of work was declared National Historic Heritage by the Uruguayan government.

== Selected works ==
- Mujer y niño (c. 1955), oil on canvas – Museo Nacional de Artes Visuales, Montevideo
- The Courtauld, London – Female Nude (c. 1955), part of the Samuel Courtauld Trust Collection.
