= Pievina =

- Frazione
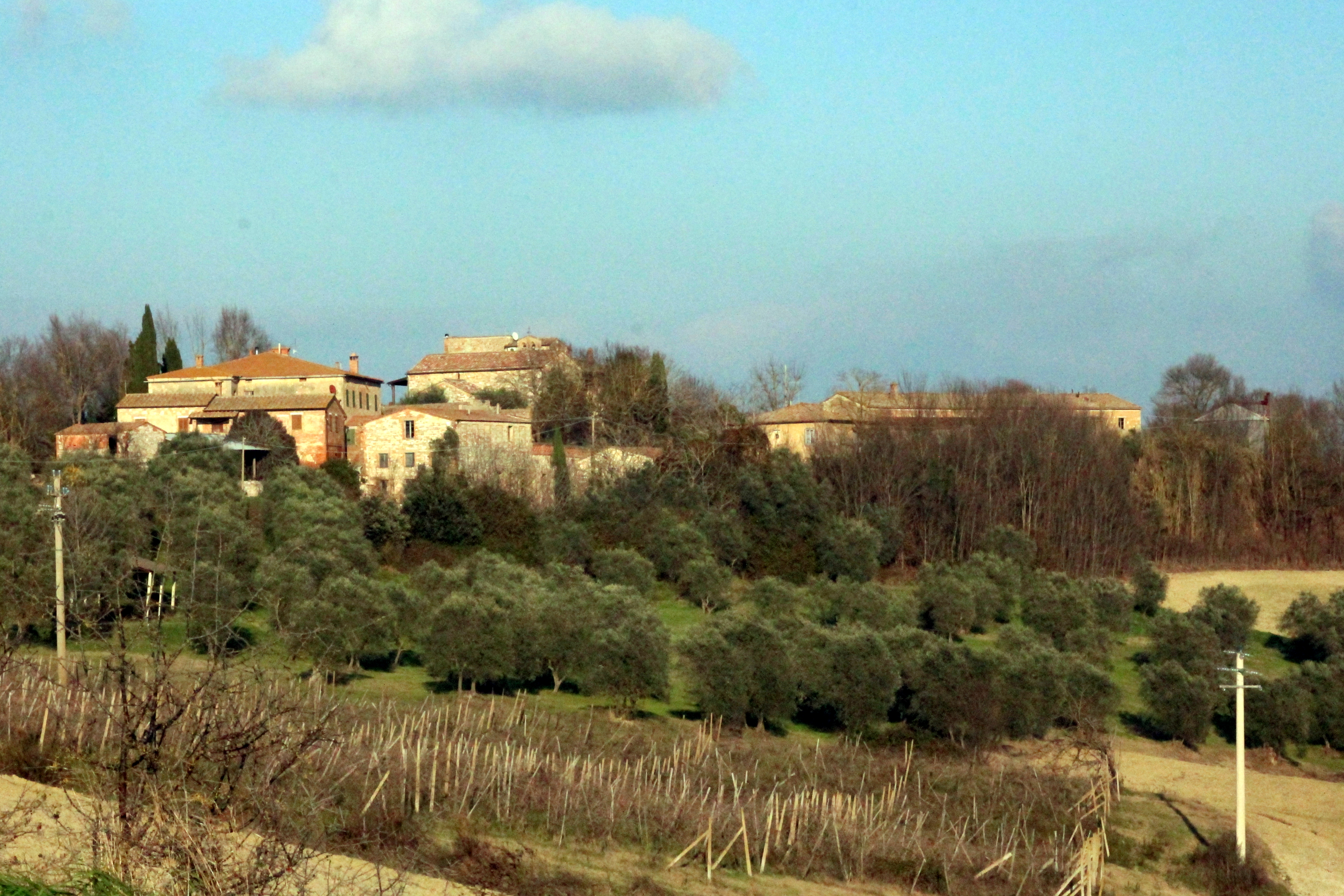
- View of Pievina

- Location of Pievina in Italy
- Coordinates: 43°15′16″N 11°30′41″E
- Country: Italy
- Region: Tuscany
- Province: Siena (SI)
- Comune: Asciano

Population (2018)
  - Total: 97
- Time zone: UTC+1 (CET)
  - Summer (DST): UTC+2 (CEST)

Pievina is a village in Tuscany, central Italy, in the comune of Asciano, province of Siena. At the time of the 2018 parish census its population was 97.

Pievina is about 25 km from Siena and 5 km from Asciano.
