= San Bernardino, Asciano =

Former Roman Catholic church in Siena province, Italy

Coordinates: 43°14′6″N 11°33′34″E

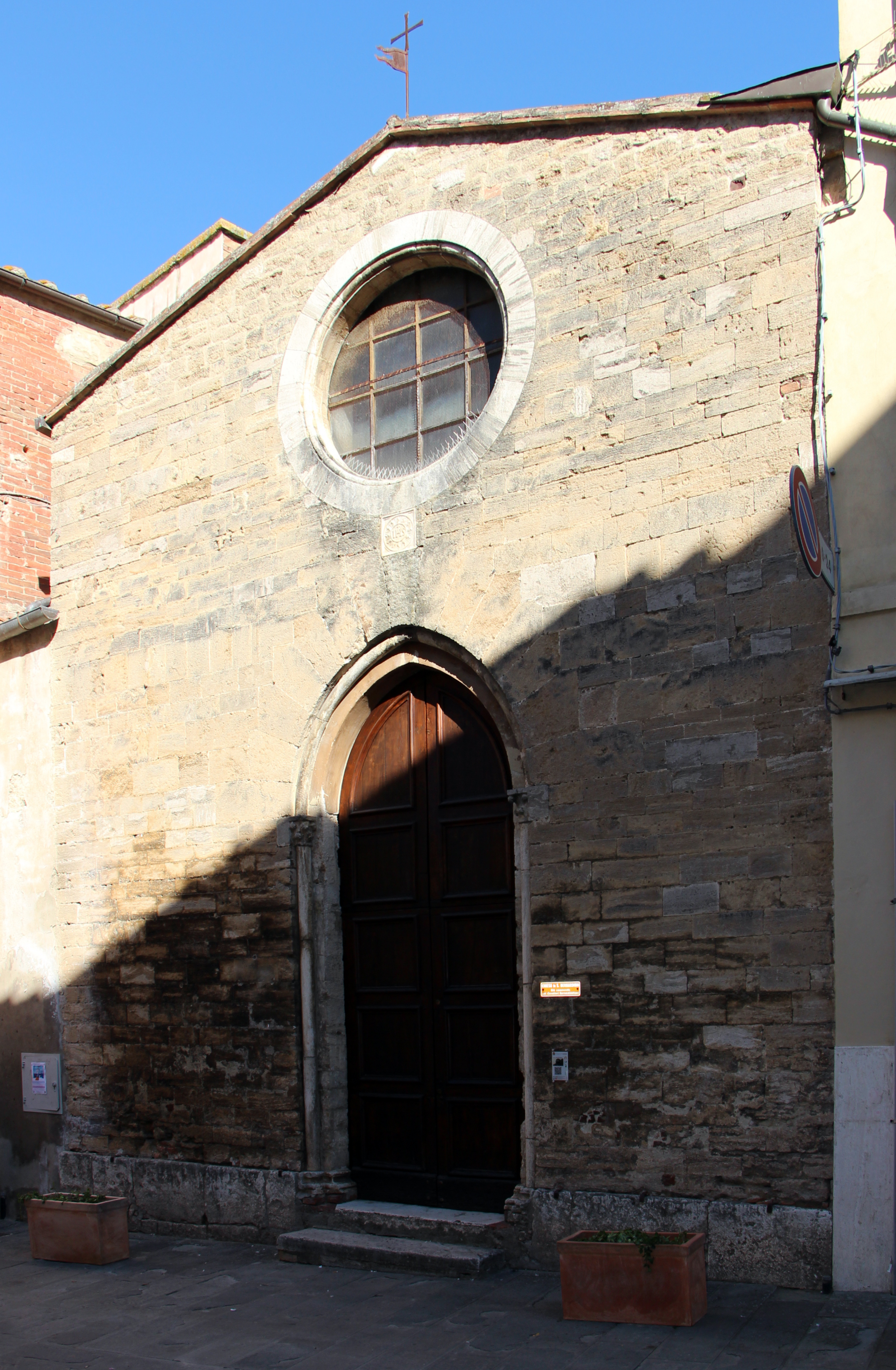
Facade.

San Bernardino is a Romanesque-style, former Roman Catholic church building, for some decades converted to museum, in the town of Asciano, Province of Siena, region of Tuscany, Italy.

== History ==
This church, was once an oratory or chapel, dedicated to San Giovanni Battista, adjacent to the church of San Francesco. It was property of a hospital of San Giovanni Battista at the site since 1178. The oratory was restored in 1324 by the Commendatore Federigo Spadafuori. It acquired the new title in 1444, with a visit from Bernardino da Siena. In the 15th century it was owned by the Knights Hospitaller.
