= Asciano =

- Comune
- Comune di Asciano
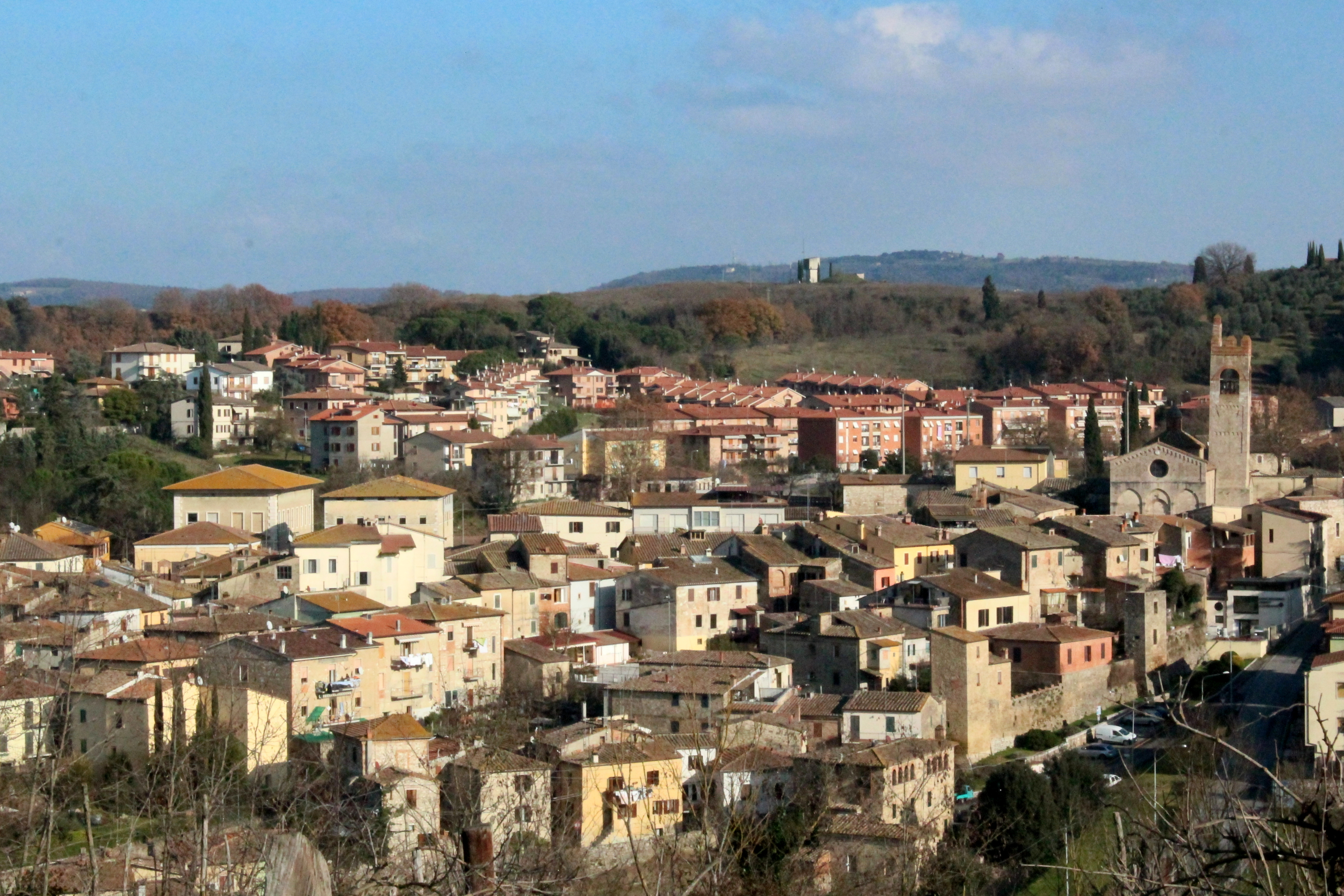
- The church of St. Agatha in Asciano.

- Coat of arms

- Location within Italy Location within Tuscany
- Coordinates: 43°14′9″N 11°34′38″E
- Country: Italy
- Region: Tuscany
- Province: Siena (SI)
- Frazioni: Arbia, Chiusure, Castelnuovo Scalo, Torre a Castello

Government
  - Mayor: Paolo Bonari

Area
  - Total: 215.6 km^{2} (83.2 sq mi)
- Elevation: 200 m (660 ft)

Population (31 December 2017)
  - Total: 7,076
  - Density: 32.82/km^{2} (85.00/sq mi)
- Demonym: Ascianesi
- Time zone: UTC+1 (CET)
  - Summer (DST): UTC+2 (CEST)
- Postal code: 53041
- Dialing code: 0577
- Patron saint: St. Agatha
- Saint day: 5 February
- Website: Official website

Asciano (Italian pronunciation: [aʃˈʃaːno]) is a comune and hill town in the province of Siena in the Italian region Tuscany. It is located at the centre of the Crete senesi between the river Ombrone and the torrent Copra, some 30 kilometres (19 mi) southeast of the town of Siena by rail.

== History ==
Asciano has origins as Etruscan, Roman and Lombard settlements. A 5th century BC Etruscan necropolis has been excavated nearby and remains of Roman baths, with a fine mosaic pavement, were found within the town in 1898. During the medieval period its location made it a site of contest between Siena and Florence: the battle of Montaperti was fought in the nearby on 4 September 1260. The village was purchased by the Sienese in 1285 and surrounded by walls in 1351, and has some 14th-century churches with paintings of the same period.

== Main sights ==
basilica of Sant'Agata: 11th century, Romanesque church, built of travertine. Layout has a single nave topped by a truss roof, is adorned with decorative elements of the Lombard type. Outside is its 13th century campanile. The interior houses two 16th-century frescoes, one by Il Sodoma and a Pietà attributed to Bartolomeo Neroni.

Adjoining the church is the Museo d'Arte Sacra where works by painters in the Sienese manner of the 14th and 15th centuries are exhibited. The Museo Archeologico contains finds from the excavation of chamber tombs from the cemetery of Poggio Pinci.

10 kilometers (6 mi) to the south is the large Benedictine monastery of Monte Oliveto Maggiore, mother-house of the Olivetans and founded in 1320. The cloister is famous for the series of frescoes illustrating scenes from the legend of St. Benedict begun by Luca Signorelli and completed by il Sodoma in 1505. The latter master's work is perhaps nowhere better represented than here. The church contains fine inlaid choir stalls by Fra Giovanni da Verona. The buildings, which are mostly of red brick, are conspicuous against the grey clayey and sandy soil—the crete senesi which give this area of Tuscany its name. The monastery is described by Pope Pius II in his Commentaria.

- San Bernardino: small Romanesque church

== Neighbouring comuni ==
Buonconvento, Castelnuovo Berardenga, Monteroni d'Arbia, Rapolano Terme, San Giovanni d'Asso, Siena, Sinalunga, Trequanda

== Frazioni ==
The municipality is formed by the municipal seat of Asciano and the towns and villages (frazioni) of Arbia, Castelnuovo Scalo, Chiusure, Torre a Castello. Other notable villages include Calceno, Campana, Camparboli, Casabianca, Casanova Pansarine, Castelnuovo Grilli, Collanza, Grania, Leonina, Medane, Monselvoli, Montalceto, Montauto, Montebaroni, Montecalvoli, Montecerconi, Montecontieri, Montemori, Monte Oliveto Maggiore, Monte Sante Marie, Mucigliani, Pievina, Poggio Pinci, San Martino in Grania, San Vito and Vescona.
