= Vescona =

- Frazione
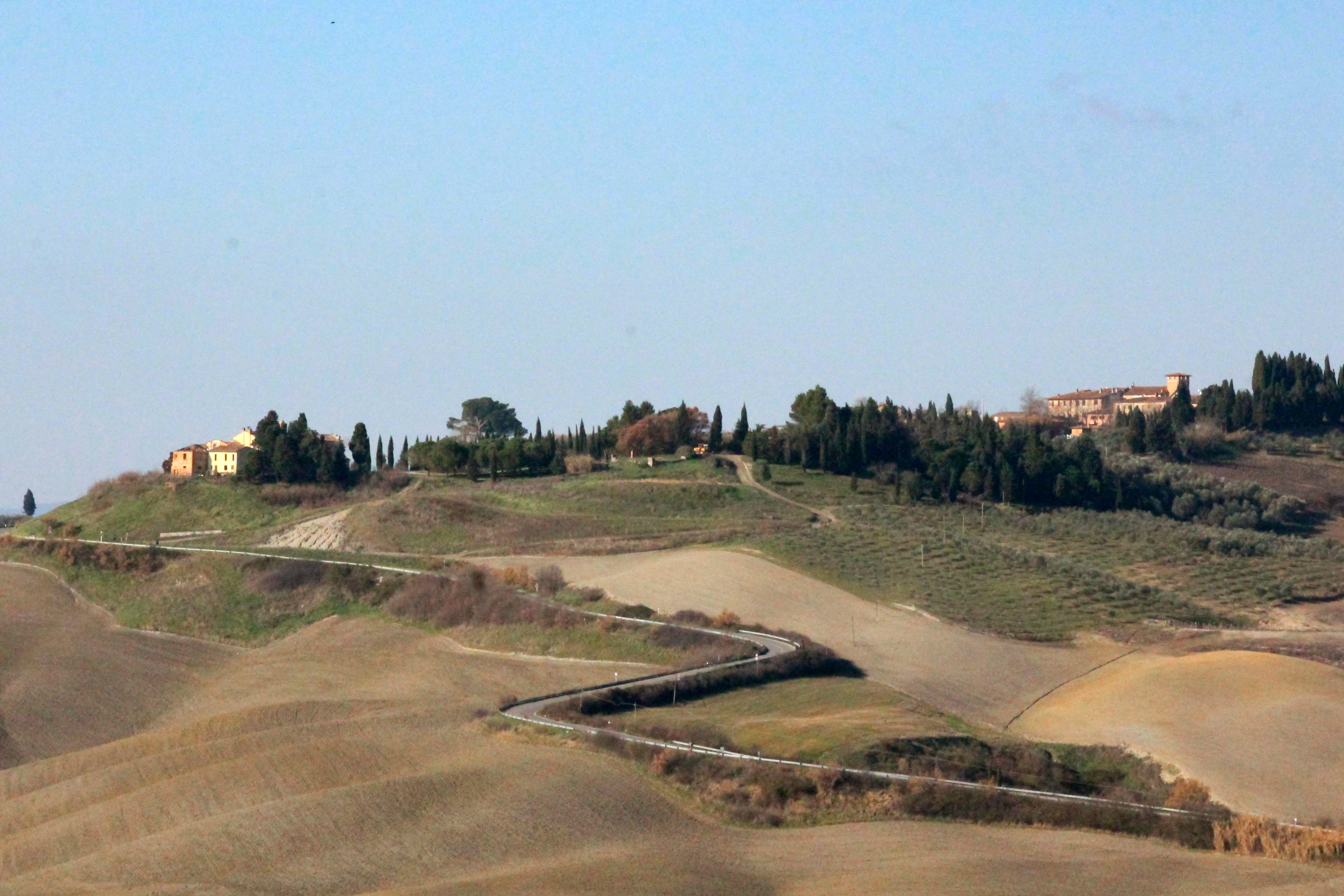
- View of Vescona

- Location of Vescona in Italy
- Coordinates: 43°16′34″N 11°29′40″E
- Country: Italy
- Region: Tuscany
- Province: Siena (SI)
- Comune: Asciano
- Elevation: 348 m (1,142 ft)

Population (2011)
  - Total: 48
- Time zone: UTC+1 (CET)
  - Summer (DST): UTC+2 (CEST)

Vescona is a village in Tuscany, central Italy, in the comune of Asciano, province of Siena. At the time of the 2001 census its population was 47.

Vescona is about 22 km from Siena and 9 km from Asciano.
