= Castelnuovo Scalo =

- Frazione
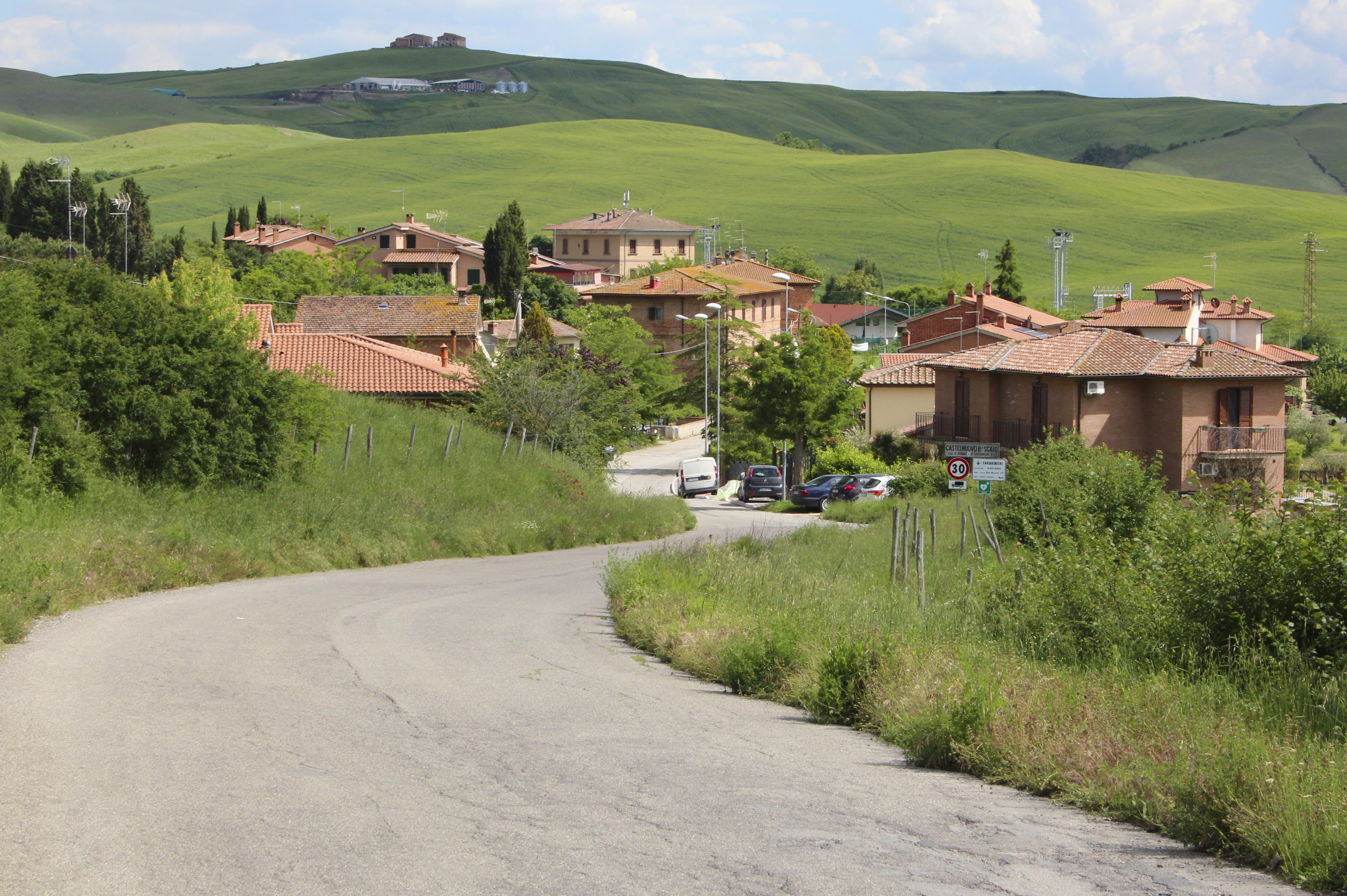

- Location of Castelnuovo Scalo in Italy
- Coordinates: 43°18′29″N 11°29′00″E
- Country: Italy
- Region: Tuscany
- Province: Siena (SI)
- Comune: Asciano; Castelnuovo Berardenga
- Elevation: 216 m (709 ft)

Population (2011)
  - Total: 91
- Time zone: UTC+1 (CET)
  - Summer (DST): UTC+2 (CEST)

Castelnuovo Scalo is a village in Tuscany, central Italy, administratively a frazione of the comuni of Asciano and Castelnuovo Berardenga, province of Siena. At the time of the 2001 census its population was 73.

Castelnuovo Scalo is about 20 km from Siena and 26 km from Asciano.
