= Torre a Castello =

- Frazione
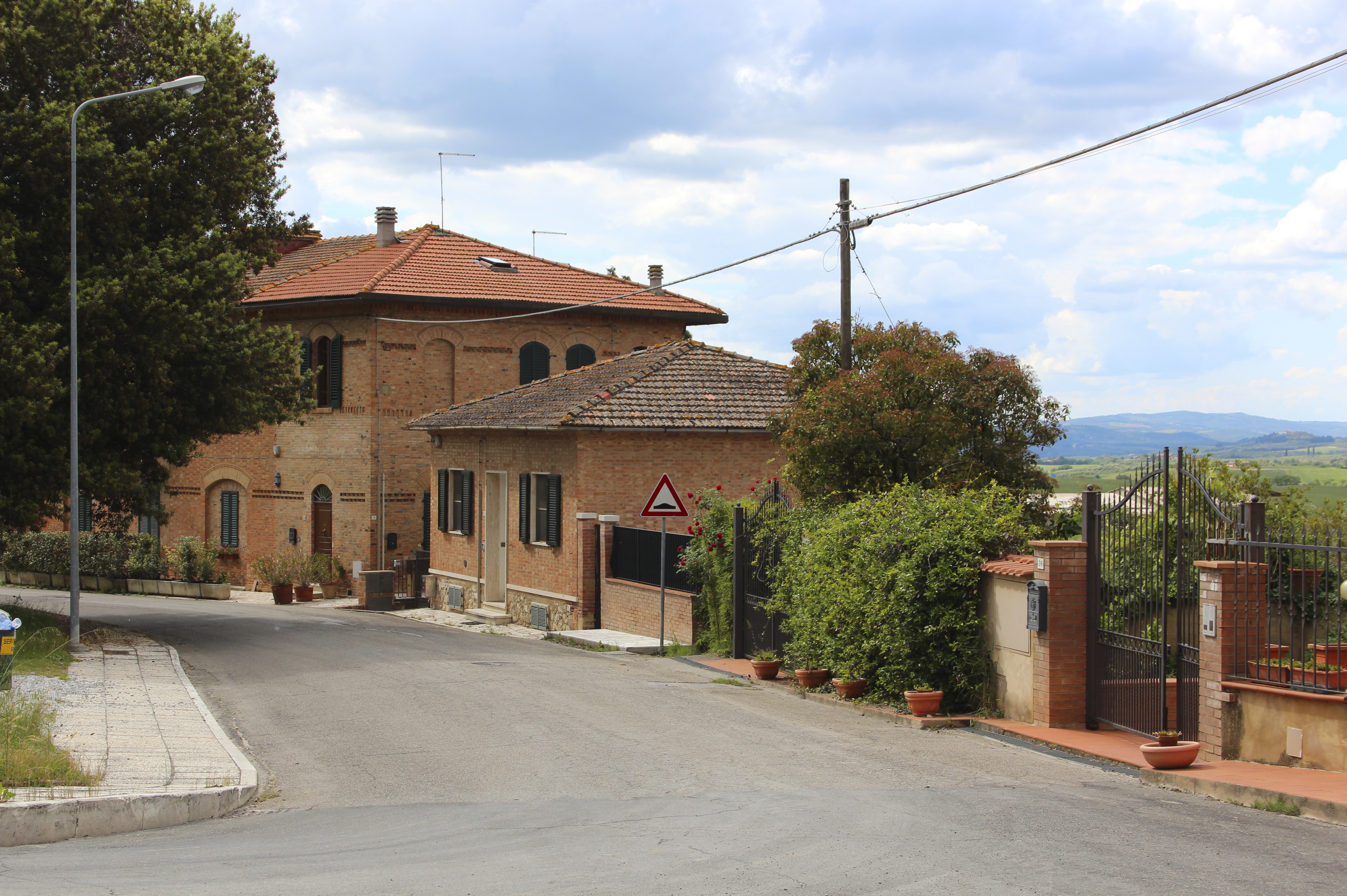

- Location of Torre a Castello in Italy
- Coordinates: 43°18′35″N 11°31′39″E
- Country: Italy
- Region: Tuscany
- Province: Siena (SI)
- Comune: Asciano
- Elevation: 331 m (1,086 ft)

Population (2011)
  - Total: 52
- Time zone: UTC+1 (CET)
  - Summer (DST): UTC+2 (CEST)

Torre a Castello is a village in Tuscany, central Italy, administratively a frazione of the comune of Asciano, province of Siena. At the time of the 2001 census its population was 57.

Torre a Castello is about 25 km from Siena and 23 km from Asciano.
