= Crete Senesi =

Area of the Italian region of Tuscany

Coordinates: 43°12′N 11°34′E

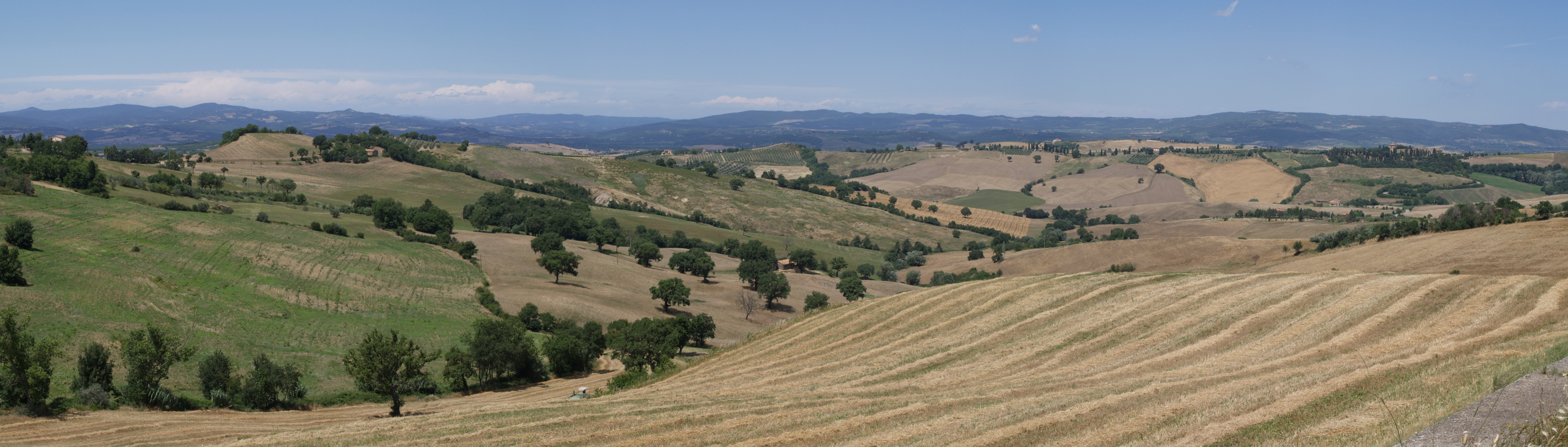
- Crete Senesi in Asciano

Geography
- Location: Province of Siena
- Country: Italy
- Region: Tuscany
- Comuni: List: Asciano; Buonconvento; Monteroni d'Arbia; Rapolano Terme; San Giovanni d'Asso
- Interactive map of Crete Senesi

The Crete Senesi refers to an area of the Italian region of Tuscany immediately to the south of Siena. It consists of a range of hills and woods among villages and includes the comuni of Asciano, Buonconvento, Monteroni d'Arbia, Rapolano Terme and San Giovanni d'Asso, all within the province of Siena. They border to the north with the Chianti Senese area, to the east with Val di Chiana and to the south-west with Val d'Orcia. Nearby is also the semi-arid area known as the Accona Desert.

Crete Senesi are literally the "clays of Siena": the distinctive grey colouration of the soil gives the landscape an appearance often described as lunar. This characteristic clay, known as mattaione, represents the sediments of the Pliocene sea which covered the area between 2.5 and 4.5 million years ago. The landscape is characterized by barren and gently undulating hills, solitary oaks and cypresses, isolated farms at the top of the heights, stretches of wood and ponds of rainwater (commonly referred as fontoni, literally "big springs") in the valleys. Badlands and biancane are typical conformations of the land.

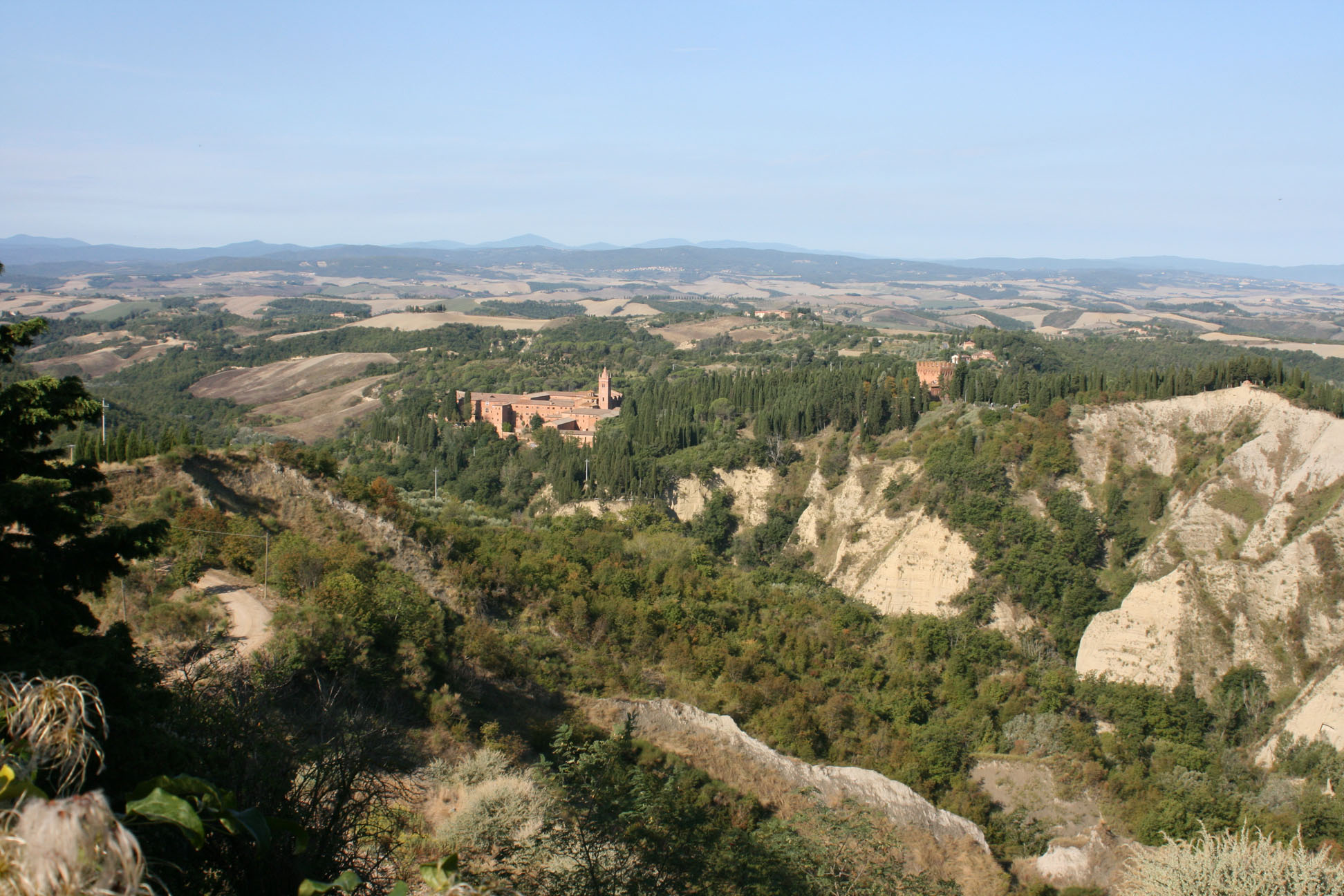
The monastery of Monte Oliveto Maggiore standing out in the hills.

Perhaps the most notable edifice of this area is the Abbey of Monte Oliveto Maggiore, located 10 km south of Asciano.

The region is known for its production of white truffles, and hosts a festival and a museum dedicated to the rare fungus (genus Tuber).

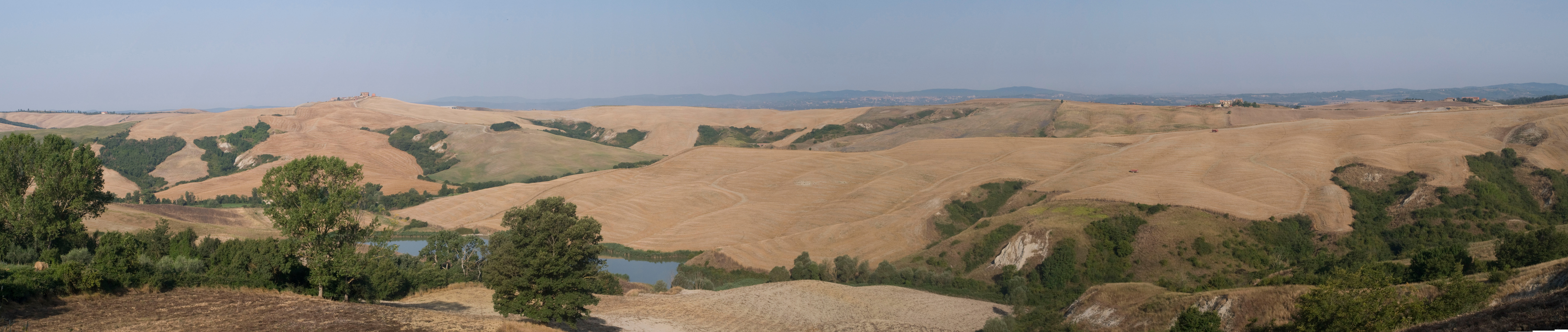
Landscape of Crete Senesi in Asciano.

== Gallery ==
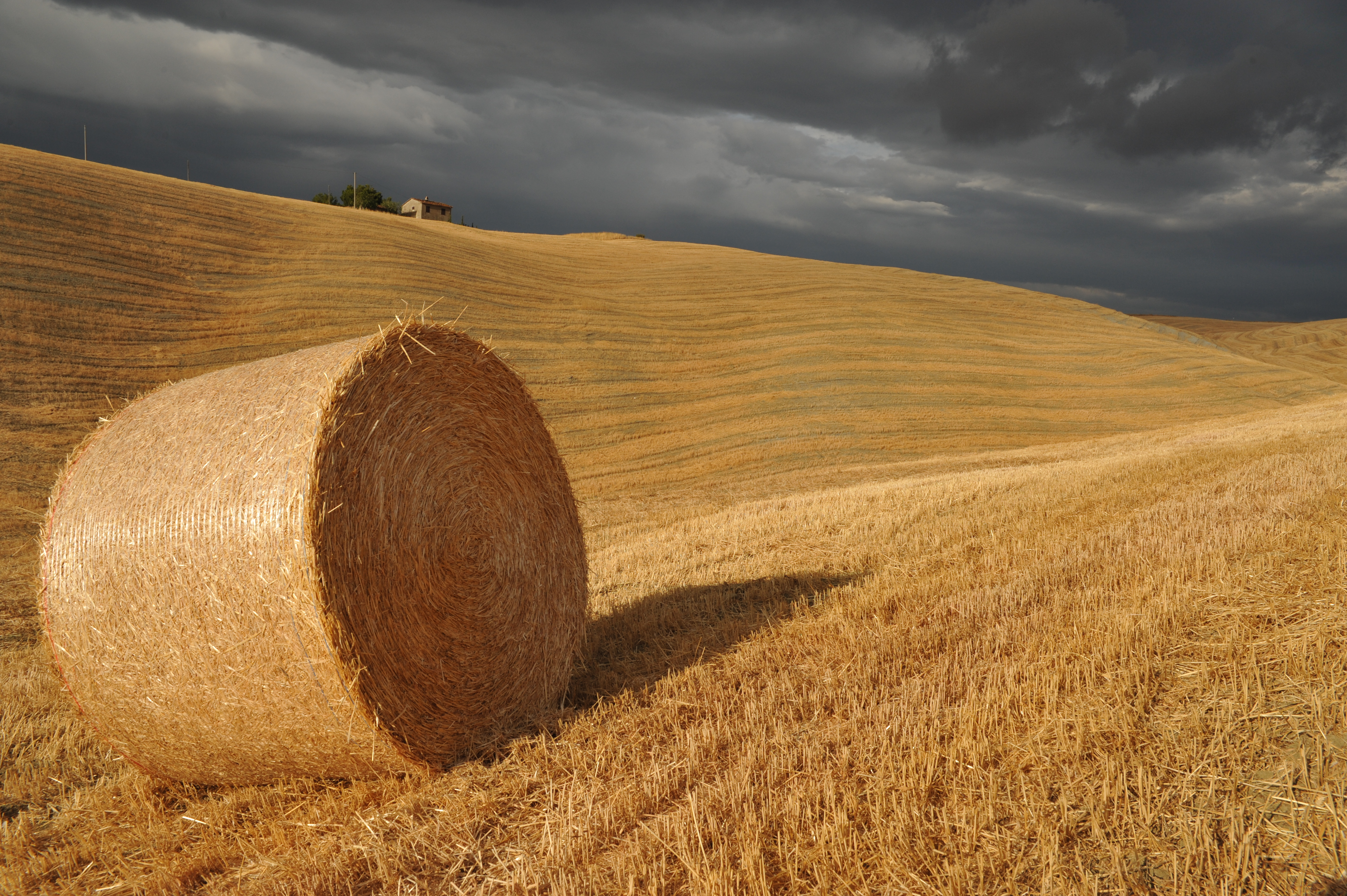
Cereal crops are cultivated with the aid of irrigation

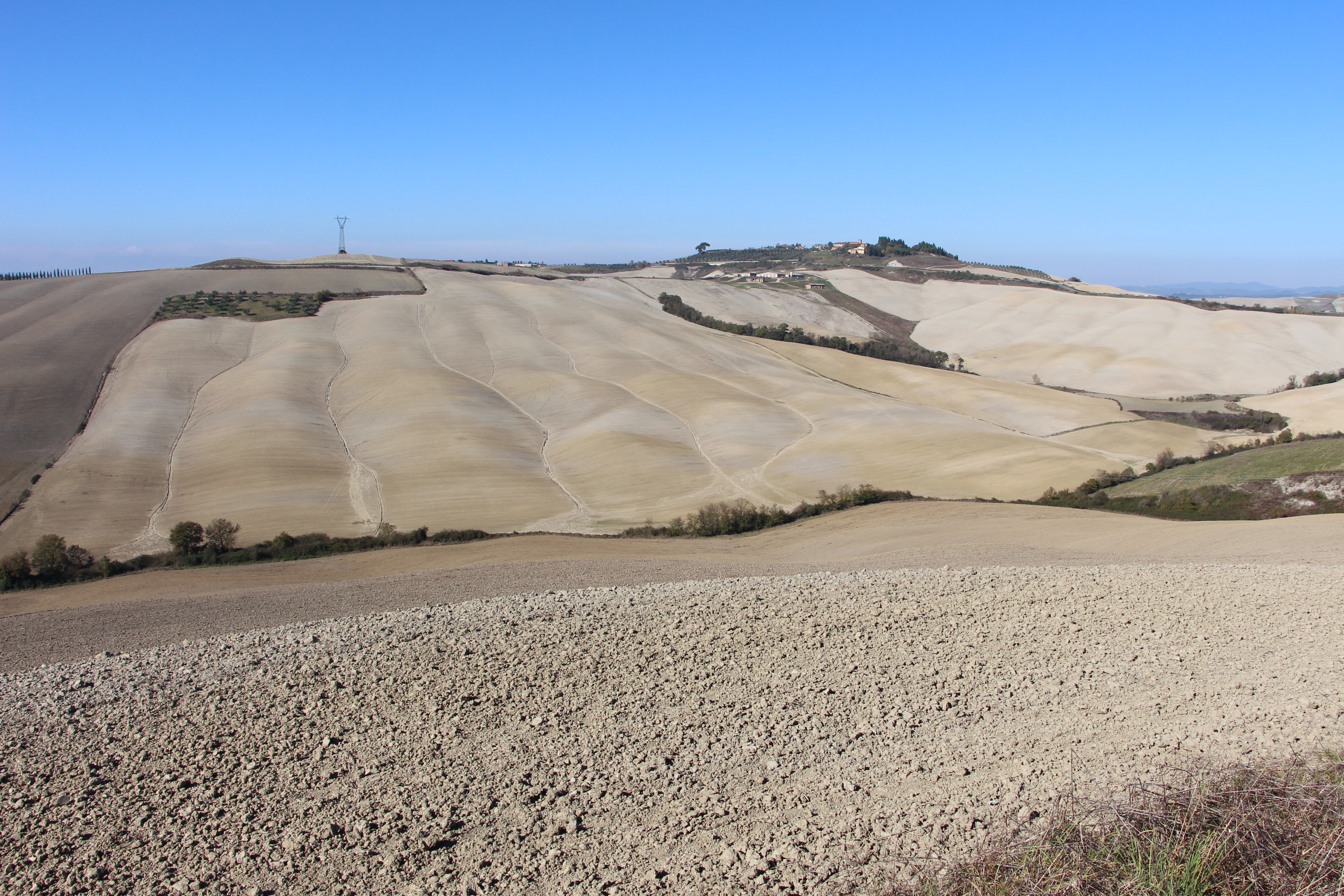
Crete Senesi in Asciano area

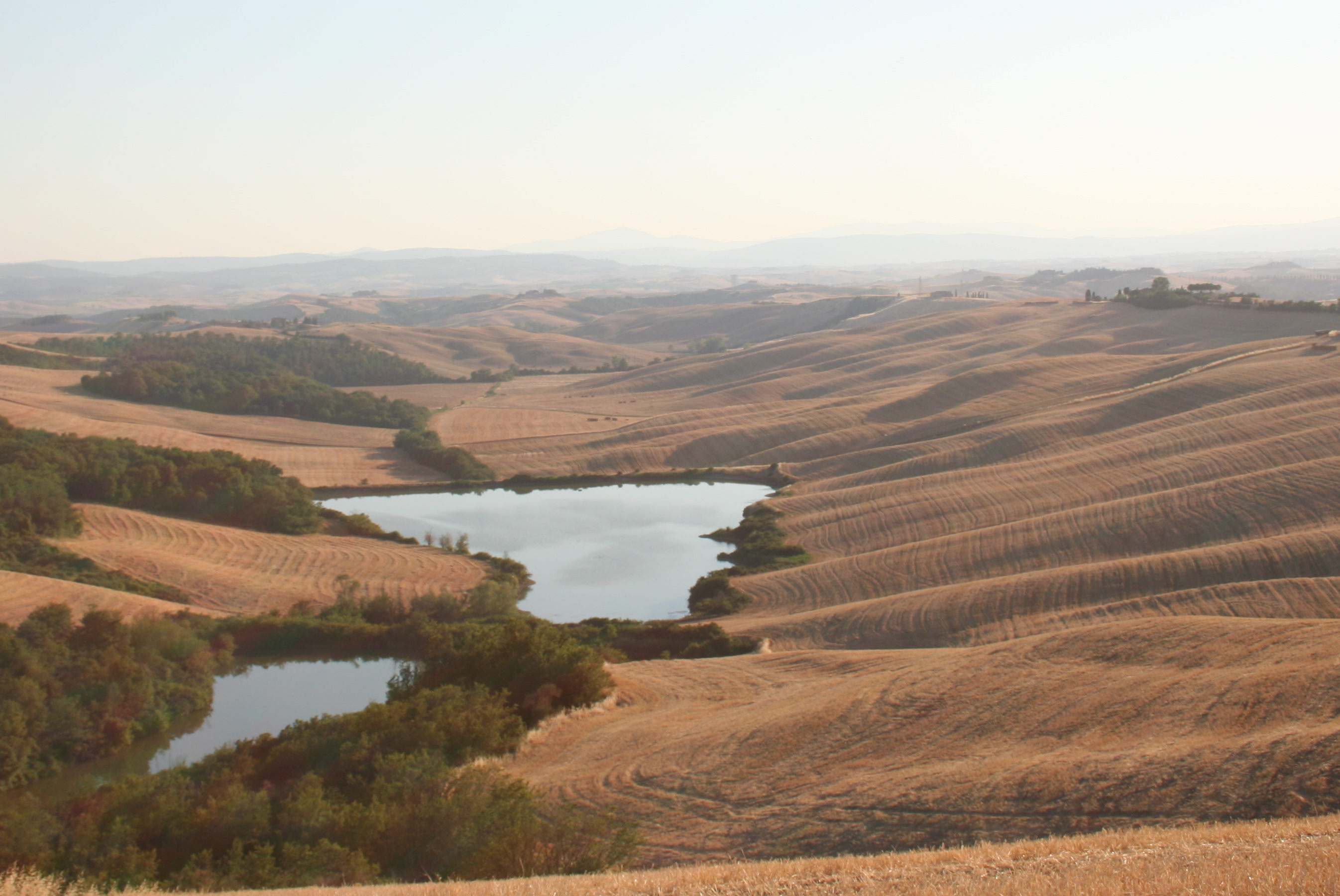
Panorama with fontoni

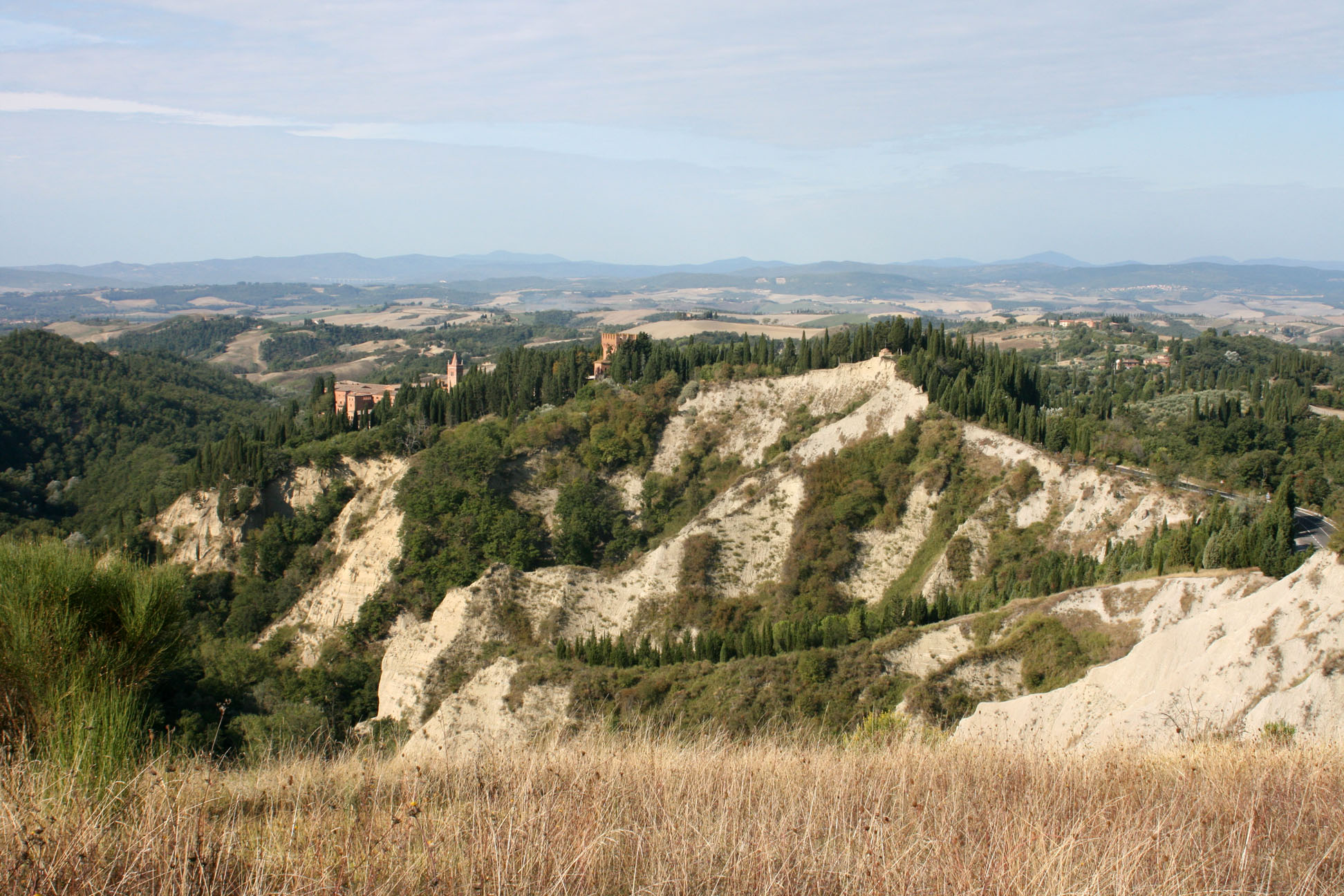
Badlands of Accona desert

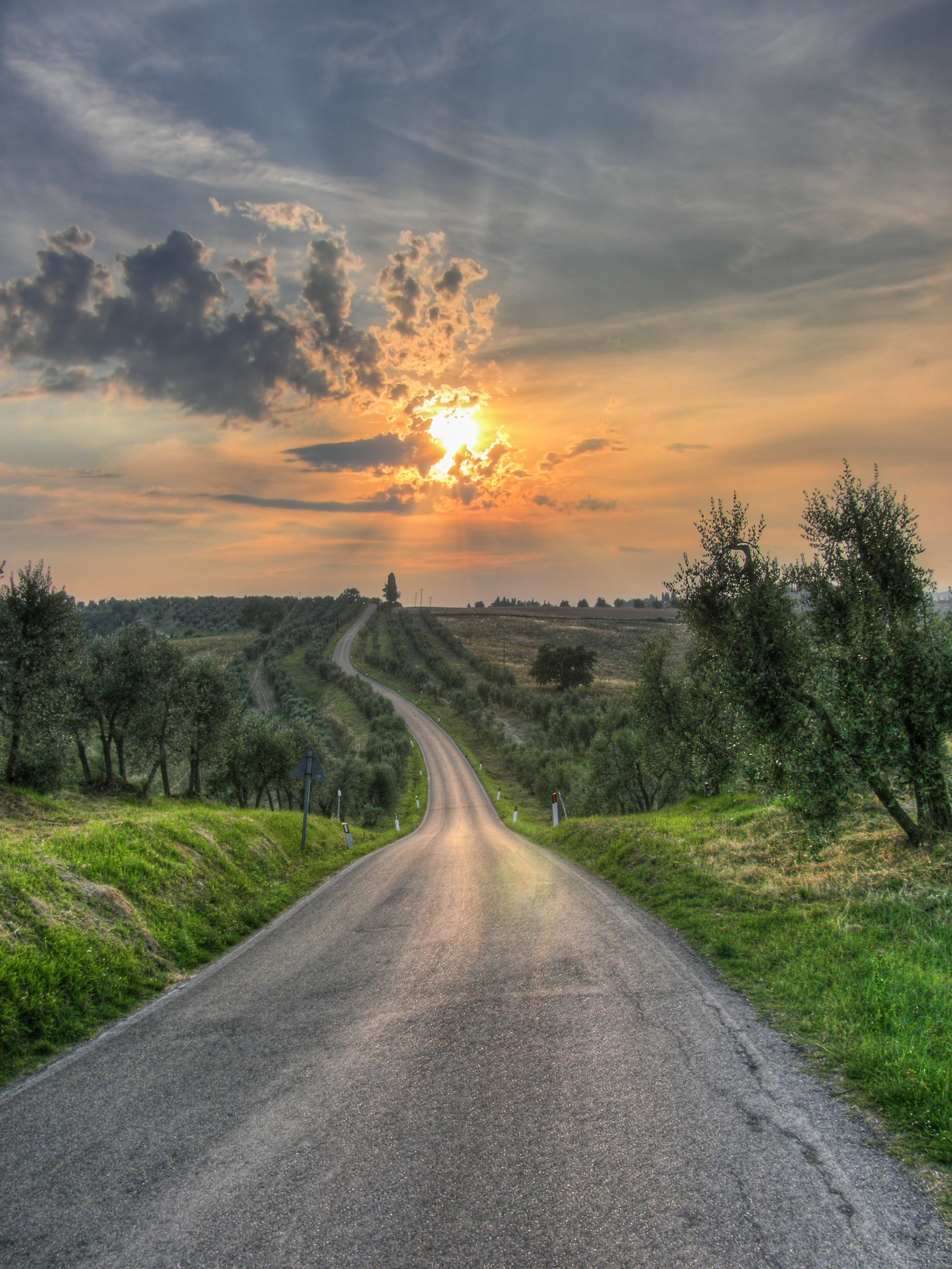
Sunset in Saltafabbro, Asciano
