= Territorial Abbey of Monte Oliveto Maggiore =

Benedictine monastery in Italy

Coordinates: 43°10′31″N 11°32′39″E

Territorial Abbey of Monte Oliveto Maggiore Abbatia Territorialis Sanctae Mariae Montis Oliveti Maioris
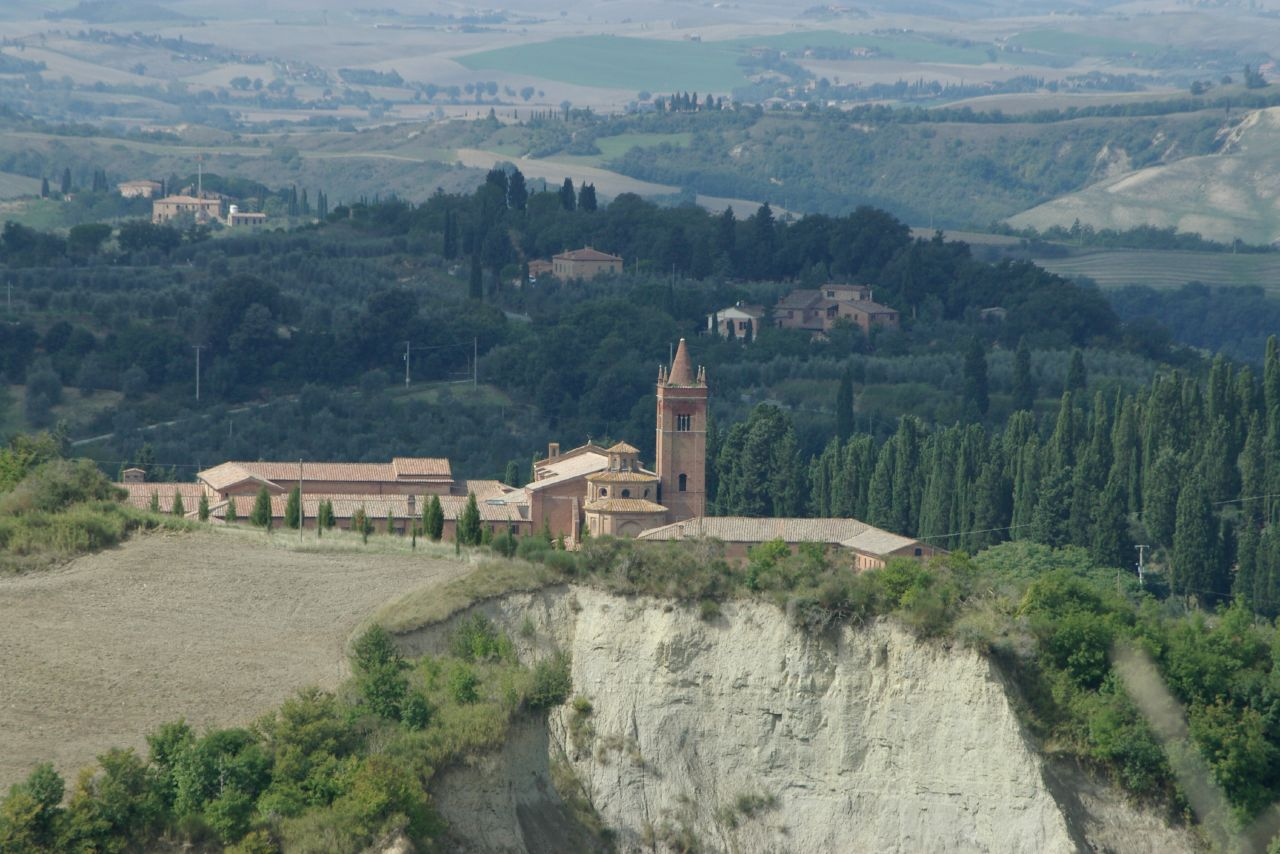
- Cathedral

Location
- Country: Italy
- Metropolitan: Immediately subject to the Holy See

Statistics
- Area: 49 km^{2} (19 sq mi)
- Population: Total; Catholics: (as of 2004); 500; 500 (100%)

Information
- Sui iuris church: Latin Church
- Rite: Roman Rite
- Cathedral: Abbazia di Monte Oliveto Maggiore

Current leadership
- Abbot: Diego Gualtiero Maria Rosa

The Abbey of Monte Oliveto Maggiore is a large Benedictine monastery in the Italian region of Tuscany, 10 km south of Asciano. Its buildings, which are mostly of red brick, are conspicuous against the grayish clay and sandy soil—the Crete senesi which give this area of Tuscany its name.

It is a territorial abbey whose abbot functions as the ordinary of the land within the abbey's possession, even though he is not consecrated as a bishop.

It is the mother-house of the Olivetans and the monastery later took the name of Monte Oliveto Maggiore ("the greater") to distinguish it from successive foundations at Florence, San Gimignano, Naples and elsewhere.

== History ==
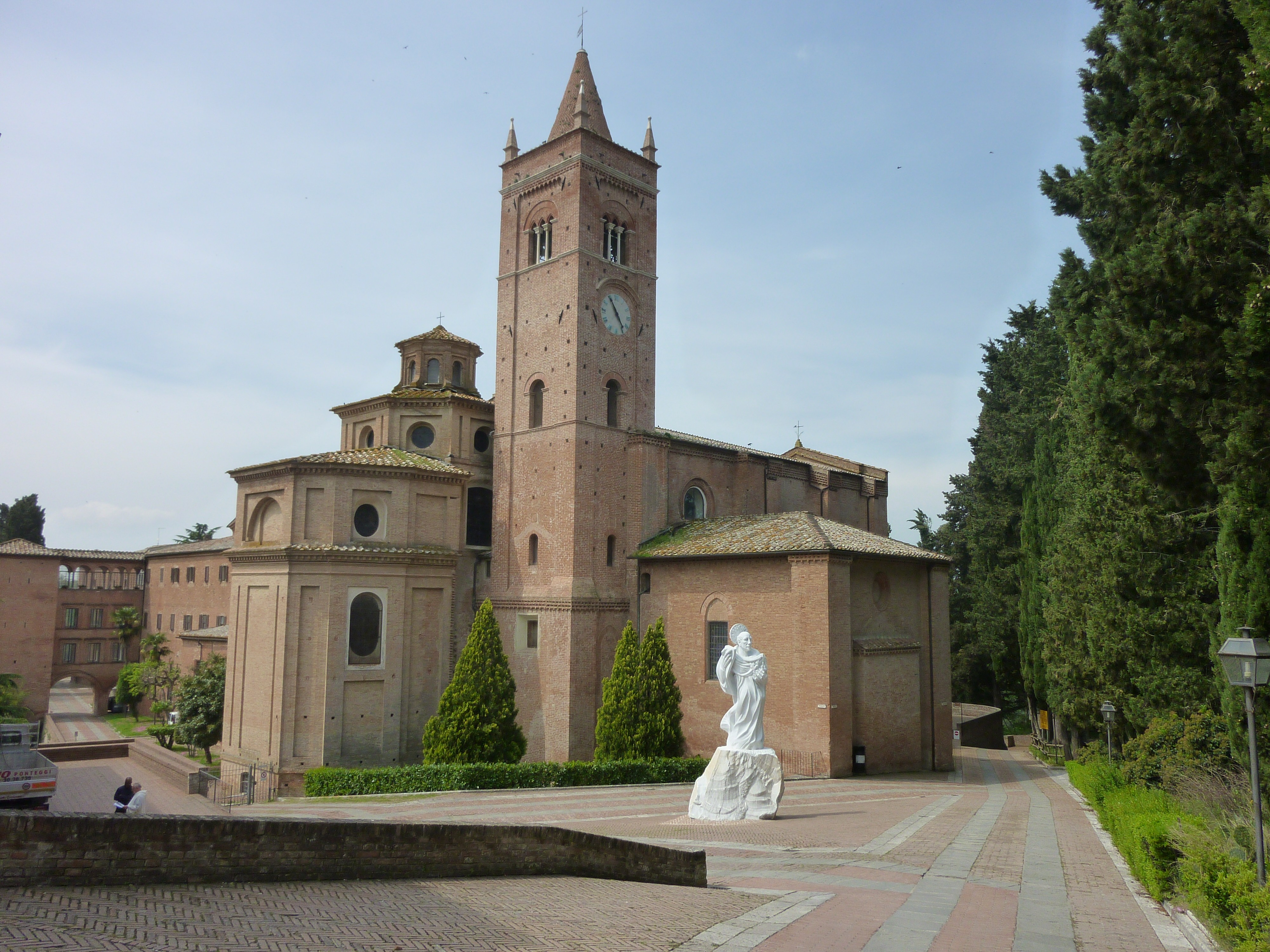
View of the abbey.

It was founded in 1313 by Bernardo Tolomei, a jurist from a prominent aristocratic family of Siena. In 1319 or 1320 it was approved by Bishop Guido Tarlati as Monte Oliveto, the name being a reference to the Mount of Olives in Jerusalem, to honour Christ’s Passion. Construction of the monastery was begun in 1320, and the new monastic congregation was approved by Pope Clement VI in 1344.

The abbey was for centuries one of the main landowners in the Siena region.

On 18 January 1765, the monastery church was made the seat of the Abbey nullius of Monte Oliveto Maggiore, meaning it had exemption from the local diocese as a quasi-diocese in its own right. After a general change of terminology in canon law it is now termed the Territorial Abbey of Monte Oliveto Maggiore.

=== Leadership ===
- Territorial Abbots of Monte Oliveto Maggiore (Latin Church)
  - Diego Gualtiero Rosa (18 October 2010 – present)
  - Michelangelo Riccardo Tiribilli (16 October 1992 – 2010)
  - Maurizio Benvenuto Maria Contorni (29 November 1986 – 1992)
  - Divo Angelo Maria Sabatini (5 December 1970 – 1986)
  - Pietro Romualdo M. Zilianti (10 May 1947 – 1970)
  - Luigi Maria Perego (15 October 1928 – 1946)
  - Mauro M. Parodi (10 September 1917 – 1928)
  - Ildebrando Polliuti (8 January 1899 – 1917)

== Overview ==
=== Interior ===
The monastery is accessed through a drawbridge which leads to a medieval palace in red brickwork, surmounted by a massive quadrangular tower with barbicans and merlons. This edifice was begun in 1393 as the fortified gate of the complex; it was completed in 1526 and restored in the 19th century. Over the entrance arch is a terracotta depicting Madonna with Child and Two Angels attributed to the Della Robbia family, as well as the St Benedict Blessing nearby.

After the entrance structure is a long alley with cypresses, sided by the botanical garden of the old pharmacy (destroyed in 1896) and a cistern from 1533. At the alley's end is the bell tower, in Romanesque-Gothic style, and the apse of the church, which has a Gothic façade.

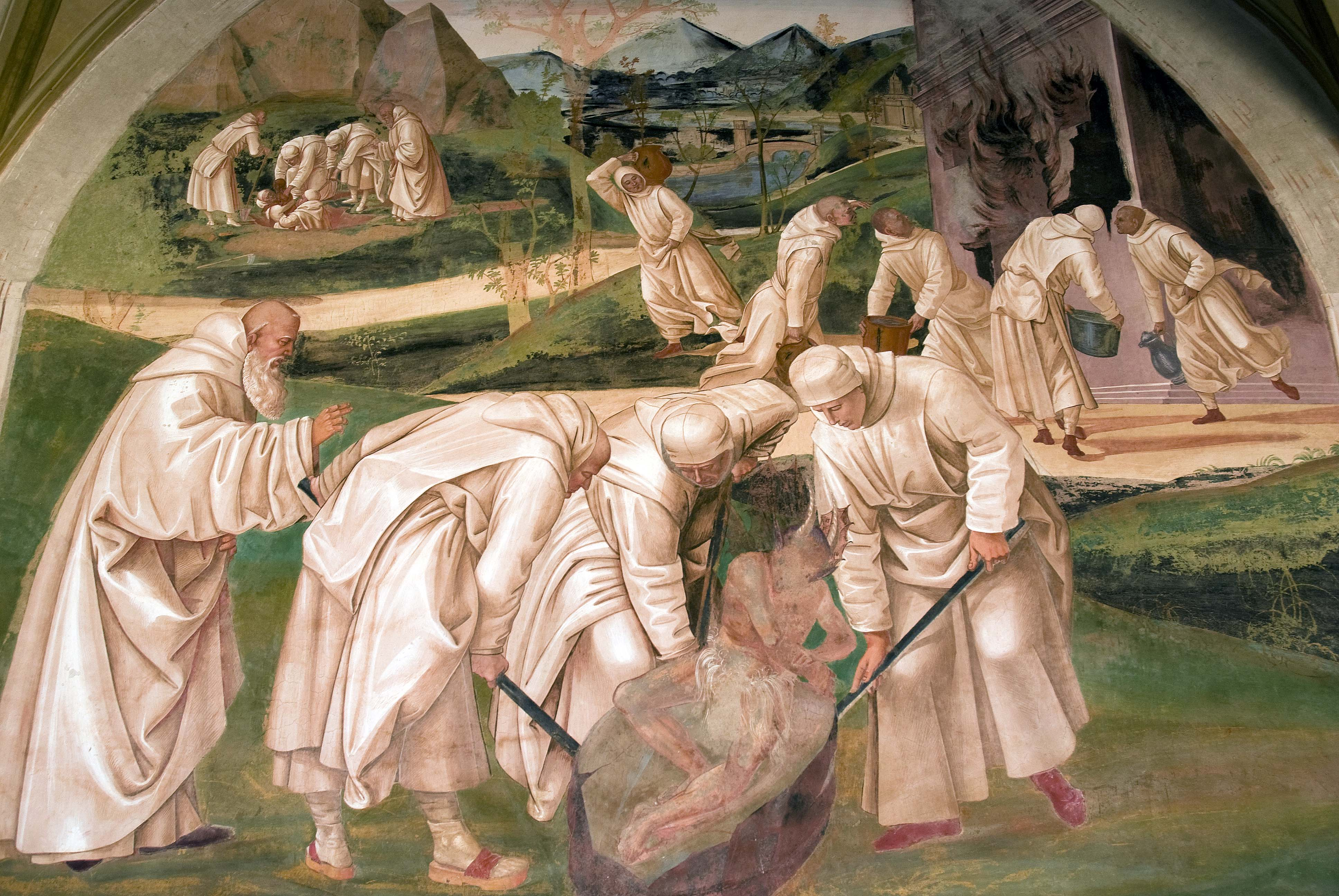
Signorelli's fresco

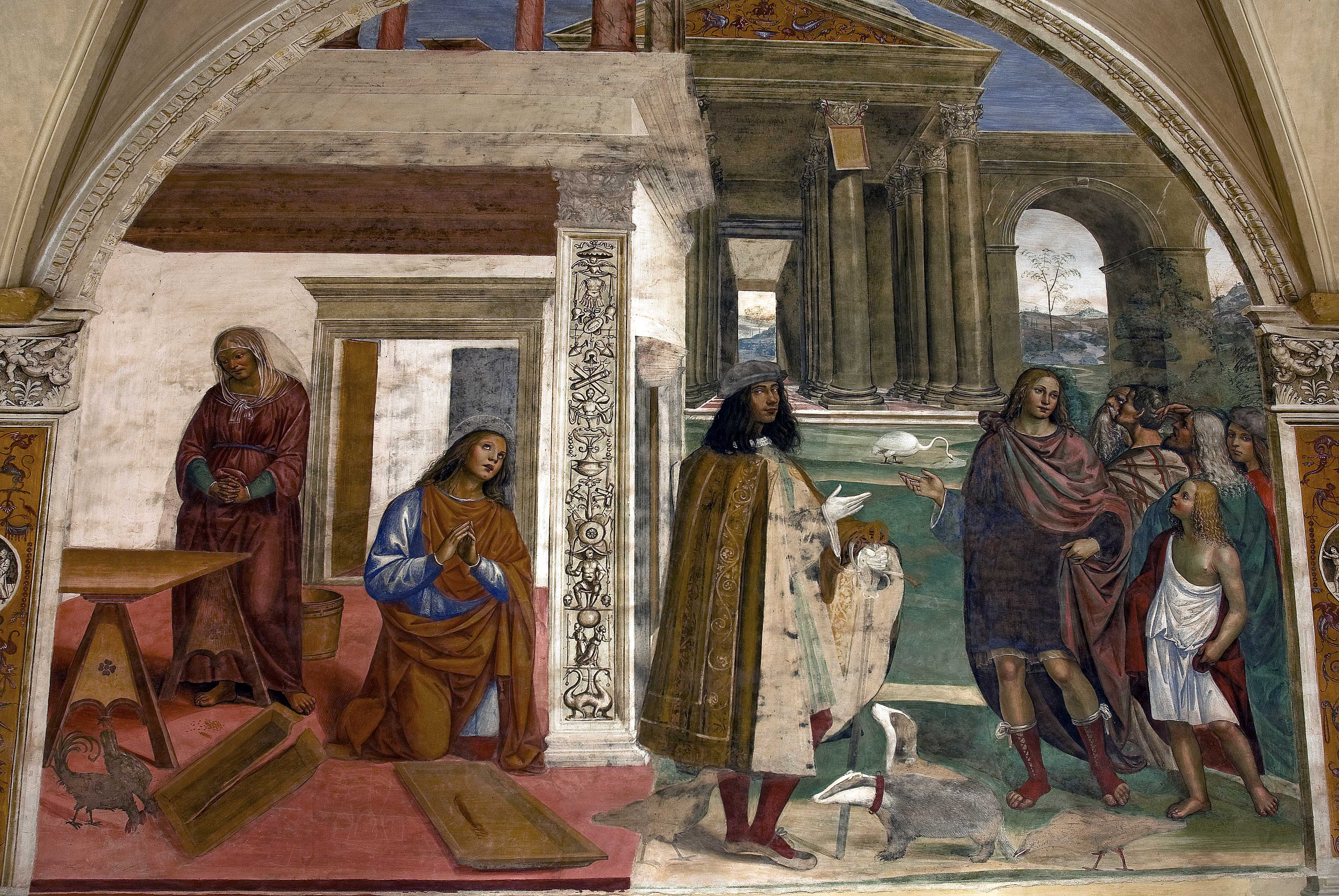
Il Sodoma's fresco

=== Chiostro Grande ===
The Chiostro Grande ("Great Cloister") has a rectangular plan and was realized between 1426 and 1443. On the oldest side, it has a two-storey loggia and a pit, dating to 1439. The frescoes of the Life of St. Benedict painted by Luca Signorelli and il Sodoma, located in the cloister lunettes under the vaults, are considered masterworks of the Italian Renaissance.

The frescoes disposition follows St. Gregory's account of Benedict's life. Signorelli's paintings were executed in 1497-98, while Sodoma's were completed after 1505.

== The church ==
The church entrance is preceded, in the Chiostro Grande, by frescoes of Jesus Carrying the Cross, Jesus at the Column and St. Benedict Giving the Rule to the Founders of Monte Oliveto, all the work of Sodoma. The church's atrium is on the site of a previous church (1319), showing on the walls frescoes with Father Hermits in the Desert and St Benedict's miracle, both by an unknown Sienese artists. In a niche is the "Madonna with Child Enthroned" by Fra Giovanni da Verona.

The church takes the form of a Latin cross. It was renovated in the Baroque style in 1772 by Giovanni Antinori. The main attraction is the wooden inlaid choir by Giovanni da Verona, executed in 1503-1505. It is one of the most outstanding examples of tarsia in Europe. The church also houses a canvas by Jacopo Ligozzi (Assumption, 1598), behind the high altar, and a 14th-century polychrome wooden Crucifix, in the Sacrament Chapel. The sacristy has an inlaid ceiling dating to 1417.

=== Chiostro di Mezzo ===
Che Chiostro di Mezzo ("Middle Cloister") was built in the 15th century, surrounded by a portico with octagonal pilasters. Artworks include a 15th-century Madonna with Child and Angels and Annunciation by Riccio. Nearby is the entrance to the refectory, decorated by frescoes by Fra Paolo Novelli (1670) and, in the end-wall, a canvas of the Last Supper by Lino Dinetto (1948).

=== Library and Pharmacy ===
The stairs leading to the first floor are decorated by Sodoma's fresco depicting the Coronation of Mary and one by an unknown artist of the Deposition. Antonio Muller (an artist from Danzig) executed in 1631 a Characters and Events of the Olivetani, while by Giovanni da Verona is a wooden candelabrum (1502). The latter artist was also an author of the library, which has a basilica plan with a nave and two aisles divided by columns with Corinthian capitals (1518). Nearby is the Monastic Library, housing some 40,000 volumes and incunabula. From the library is the access to the Pharmacy, housing a collection of medicinal herbs in 17th-century vases,

=== Definitorio ===
The name Definitorio refers to the Capitular Hall (1498), on whose end wall is a fresco of Madonna with Child and Saints by Matteo Ripanda (16th century); the hall houses a small museum of Sacred Arts, with works by Segna di Bonaventura (Madonna with Child), the Master of Monte Oliveto (Maestà), Neroccio di Bartolomeo (St. Bernardino), Vincenzo Tamagni (Madonna with Child) and a fresco portraying St. Sebastian by an artist of the Sienese School.
