= Chiusure =

- Frazione
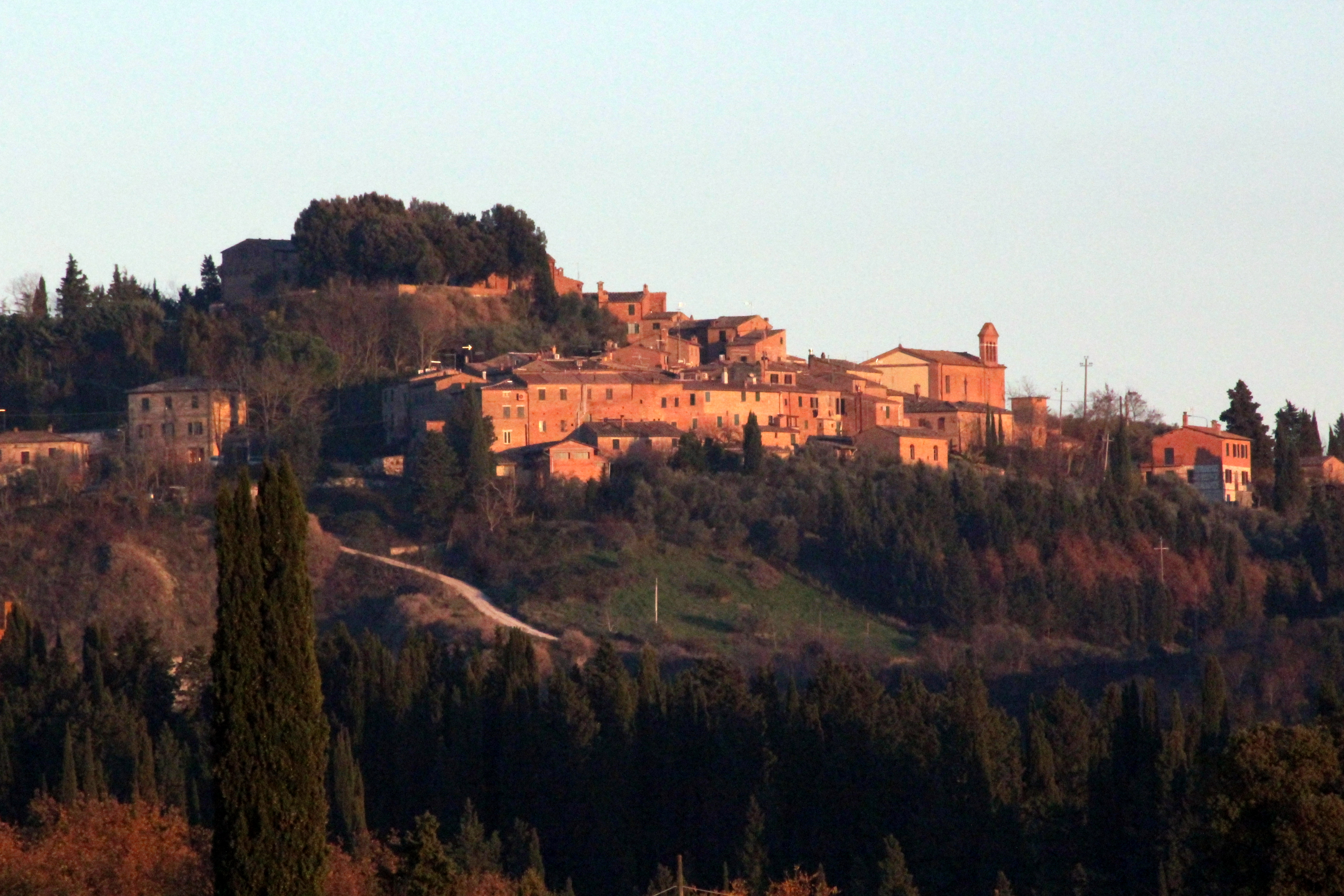
- View of Chiusure

- Location of Chiusure in Italy
- Coordinates: 43°10′33″N 11°33′33″E
- Country: Italy
- Region: Tuscany
- Province: Siena (SI)
- Comune: Asciano
- Elevation: 401 m (1,316 ft)

Population (2011)
  - Total: 116
- Demonym: Chiusurini
- Time zone: UTC+1 (CET)
  - Summer (DST): UTC+2 (CEST)

Chiusure is a village in Tuscany, central Italy, administratively a frazione of the comune of Asciano, province of Siena. At the time of the 2001 census its population was 115.

Chiusure is about 39 km from Siena and 10 km from Asciano.
