= Arbia, Asciano =

Arbia
- Frazione
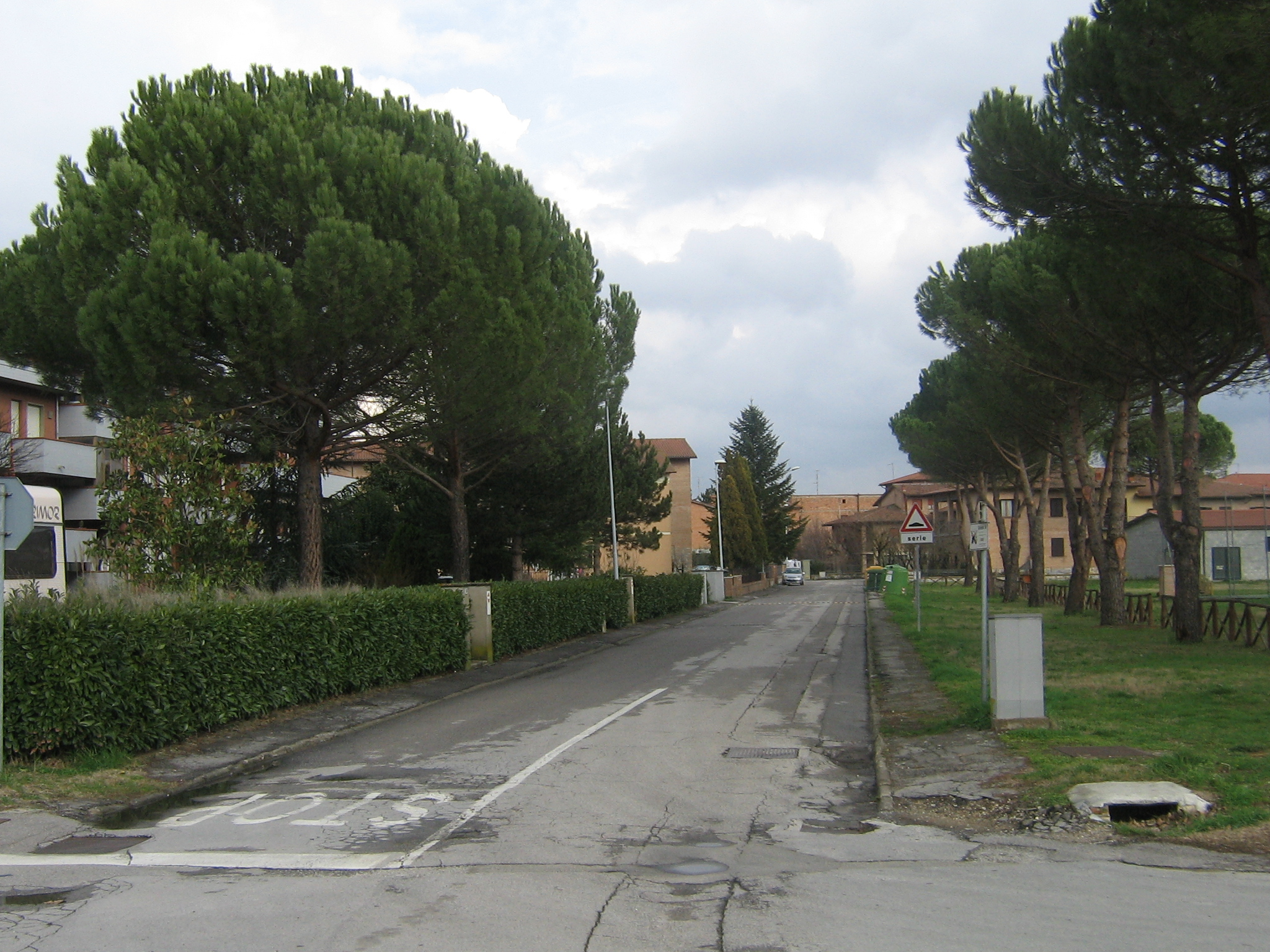

- Location of Arbia in Italy
- Coordinates: 43°17′37″N 11°24′34″E
- Country: Italy
- Region: Tuscany
- Province: Siena (SI)
- Comune: Asciano
- Elevation: 185 m (607 ft)

Population (2011)
  - Total: 1,582
- Time zone: UTC+1 (CET)
  - Summer (DST): UTC+2 (CEST)

Arbia is a town in Tuscany, central Italy, administratively a frazione of the comune of Asciano, province of Siena. At the time of the 2001 census its population was 1,303.

Arbia is about 13 km from Siena and 17 km from Asciano.
