= San Giovanni d'Asso =

San Giovanni d’Asso
- Frazione
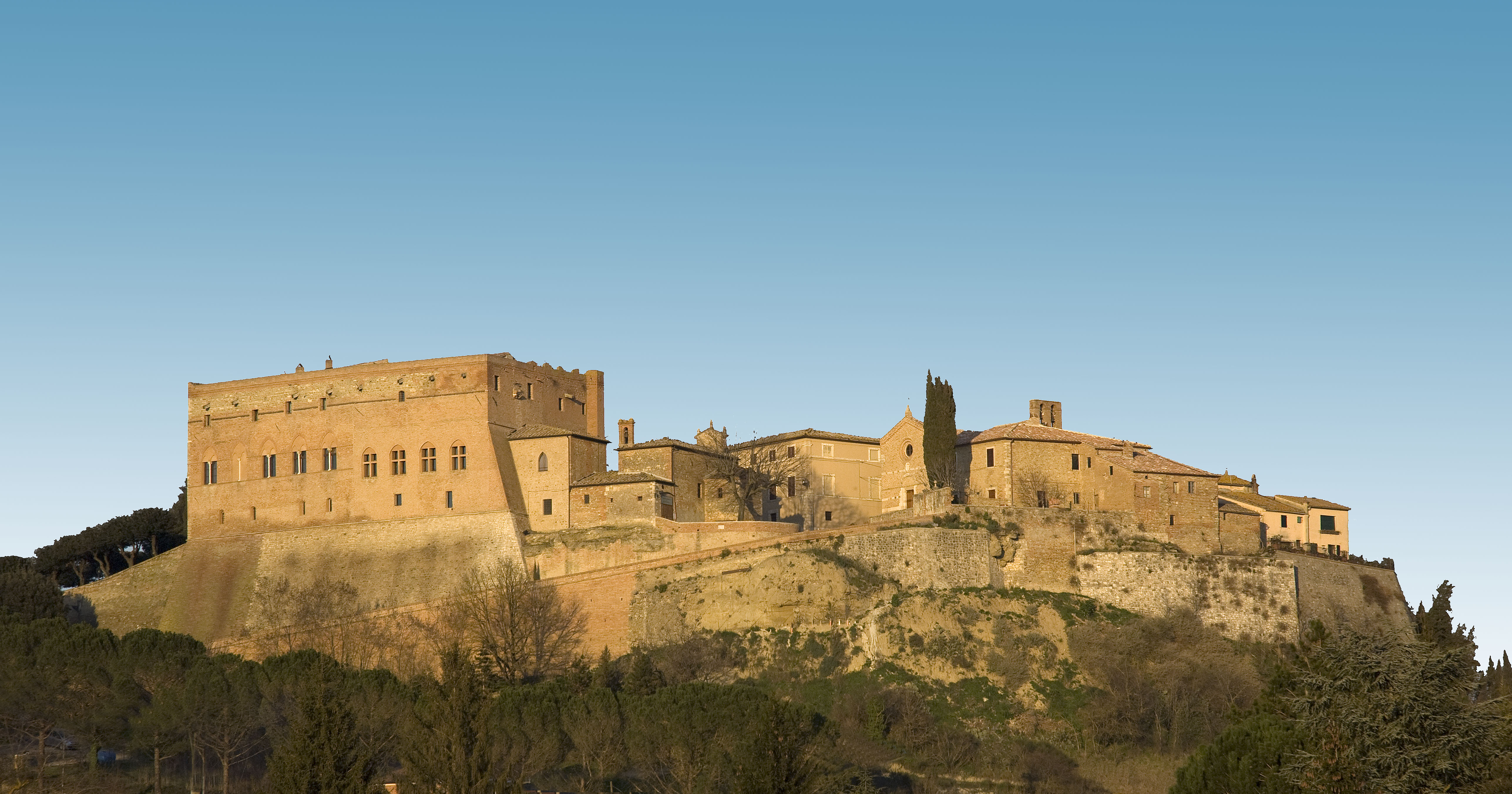

- Location of San Giovanni d’Asso in Italy
- Coordinates: 43°9′N 11°35′E
- Country: Italy
- Region: Tuscany
- Province: Siena (SI)
- Comune: Montalcino
- Elevation: 310 m (1,020 ft)

Population (2011)
  - Total: 329
- Demonym: Sangiovannesi
- Time zone: UTC+1 (CET)
  - Summer (DST): UTC+2 (CEST)
- Postal code: 53020
- Dialing code: 0577

San Giovanni d’Asso is a frazione of the comune of Montalcino, province of Siena, Italy. It is located about 125 kilometres (78 mi) southeast of Florence and about 40 kilometres (25 mi) southeast of Siena in the area known as the Crete Senesi.

It was a comune until 2017. The hamlet is overlooked by large Castle, now home to a large White truffle museum, and there is a festival celebrating the rare and fragrant tuber each year. The historical centre also houses the churches of San Giovanni Battista (pieve) and San Pietro in Villore, both of medieval origin.
